= Common year starting on Tuesday =

A common year starting on Tuesday is any non-leap year (i.e. a year with 365 days) that begins on Tuesday, 1 January, and ends on Tuesday, 31 December. Its dominical letter hence is F. The most recent year of such kind was 2019, and the next one will be 2030, or, likewise, 2025 and 2031 in the obsolete Julian calendar, see below for more.

Any common year that starts on Tuesday has two Friday the 13ths: those two in this common year occur in September and December. Leap years starting on Monday share this characteristic. From July of the year preceding this year until September in this type of year is the longest period (14 months) that occurs without a Friday the 13th. Leap years starting on Saturday share this characteristic, from August of the common year that precedes it to October in that type of year.

== Calendars ==
Calendar for any common year starting on Tuesday,
presented as common in many English-speaking areas

	January
Su	Mo	Tu	We	Th	Fr	Sa
		1	2	3	4	5
6	7	8	9	10	11	12
13	14	15	16	17	18	19
20	21	22	23	24	25	26
27	28	29	30	31

	February
Su	Mo	Tu	We	Th	Fr	Sa
					1	2
3	4	5	6	7	8	9
10	11	12	13	14	15	16
17	18	19	20	21	22	23
24	25	26	27	28

	March
Su	Mo	Tu	We	Th	Fr	Sa
					1	2
3	4	5	6	7	8	9
10	11	12	13	14	15	16
17	18	19	20	21	22	23
24	25	26	27	28	29	30
31

	April
Su	Mo	Tu	We	Th	Fr	Sa
	1	2	3	4	5	6
7	8	9	10	11	12	13
14	15	16	17	18	19	20
21	22	23	24	25	26	27
28	29	30

	May
Su	Mo	Tu	We	Th	Fr	Sa
			1	2	3	4
5	6	7	8	9	10	11
12	13	14	15	16	17	18
19	20	21	22	23	24	25
26	27	28	29	30	31

	June
Su	Mo	Tu	We	Th	Fr	Sa
						1
2	3	4	5	6	7	8
9	10	11	12	13	14	15
16	17	18	19	20	21	22
23	24	25	26	27	28	29
30

	July
Su	Mo	Tu	We	Th	Fr	Sa
	1	2	3	4	5	6
7	8	9	10	11	12	13
14	15	16	17	18	19	20
21	22	23	24	25	26	27
28	29	30	31

	August
Su	Mo	Tu	We	Th	Fr	Sa
				1	2	3
4	5	6	7	8	9	10
11	12	13	14	15	16	17
18	19	20	21	22	23	24
25	26	27	28	29	30	31

	September
Su	Mo	Tu	We	Th	Fr	Sa
1	2	3	4	5	6	7
8	9	10	11	12	13	14
15	16	17	18	19	20	21
22	23	24	25	26	27	28
29	30

	October
Su	Mo	Tu	We	Th	Fr	Sa
		1	2	3	4	5
6	7	8	9	10	11	12
13	14	15	16	17	18	19
20	21	22	23	24	25	26
27	28	29	30	31

	November
Su	Mo	Tu	We	Th	Fr	Sa
					1	2
3	4	5	6	7	8	9
10	11	12	13	14	15	16
17	18	19	20	21	22	23
24	25	26	27	28	29	30

	December
Su	Mo	Tu	We	Th	Fr	Sa
1	2	3	4	5	6	7
8	9	10	11	12	13	14
15	16	17	18	19	20	21
22	23	24	25	26	27	28
29	30	31

ISO 8601-conformant calendar with week numbers for
any common year starting on Tuesday (dominical letter F)

	January
Wk	Mo	Tu	We	Th	Fr	Sa	Su
01		01	02	03	04	05	06
02	07	08	09	10	11	12	13
03	14	15	16	17	18	19	20
04	21	22	23	24	25	26	27
05	28	29	30	31

	February
Wk	Mo	Tu	We	Th	Fr	Sa	Su
05					01	02	03
06	04	05	06	07	08	09	10
07	11	12	13	14	15	16	17
08	18	19	20	21	22	23	24
09	25	26	27	28

	March
Wk	Mo	Tu	We	Th	Fr	Sa	Su
09					01	02	03
10	04	05	06	07	08	09	10
11	11	12	13	14	15	16	17
12	18	19	20	21	22	23	24
13	25	26	27	28	29	30	31

	April
Wk	Mo	Tu	We	Th	Fr	Sa	Su
14	01	02	03	04	05	06	07
15	08	09	10	11	12	13	14
16	15	16	17	18	19	20	21
17	22	23	24	25	26	27	28
18	29	30

	May
Wk	Mo	Tu	We	Th	Fr	Sa	Su
18			01	02	03	04	05
19	06	07	08	09	10	11	12
20	13	14	15	16	17	18	19
21	20	21	22	23	24	25	26
22	27	28	29	30	31

	June
Wk	Mo	Tu	We	Th	Fr	Sa	Su
22						01	02
23	03	04	05	06	07	08	09
24	10	11	12	13	14	15	16
25	17	18	19	20	21	22	23
26	24	25	26	27	28	29	30

	July
Wk	Mo	Tu	We	Th	Fr	Sa	Su
27	01	02	03	04	05	06	07
28	08	09	10	11	12	13	14
29	15	16	17	18	19	20	21
30	22	23	24	25	26	27	28
31	29	30	31

	August
Wk	Mo	Tu	We	Th	Fr	Sa	Su
31				01	02	03	04
32	05	06	07	08	09	10	11
33	12	13	14	15	16	17	18
34	19	20	21	22	23	24	25
35	26	27	28	29	30	31

	September
Wk	Mo	Tu	We	Th	Fr	Sa	Su
35							01
36	02	03	04	05	06	07	08
37	09	10	11	12	13	14	15
38	16	17	18	19	20	21	22
39	23	24	25	26	27	28	29
40	30

	October
Wk	Mo	Tu	We	Th	Fr	Sa	Su
40		01	02	03	04	05	06
41	07	08	09	10	11	12	13
42	14	15	16	17	18	19	20
43	21	22	23	24	25	26	27
44	28	29	30	31

	November
Wk	Mo	Tu	We	Th	Fr	Sa	Su
44					01	02	03
45	04	05	06	07	08	09	10
46	11	12	13	14	15	16	17
47	18	19	20	21	22	23	24
48	25	26	27	28	29	30

	December
Wk	Mo	Tu	We	Th	Fr	Sa	Su
48							01
49	02	03	04	05	06	07	08
50	09	10	11	12	13	14	15
51	16	17	18	19	20	21	22
52	23	24	25	26	27	28	29
01	30	31

== Applicable years ==
=== Gregorian Calendar ===
In the (currently used) Gregorian calendar, along with Thursday, the fourteen types of year (seven common, seven leap) repeat in a 400-year cycle (20871 weeks). Forty-four common years per cycle or exactly 11% start on a Tuesday. The 28-year sub-cycle only spans across century years divisible by 400, e.g. 1600, 2000, and 2400.

Gregorian common years starting on Tuesday
Decade	1st		2nd		3rd	4th		5th		6th	7th		8th	9th	10th	
16th century	prior to first adoption (proleptic)													1585	1591	
17th century	1602		1613	1619	1630	—		1641	1647	1658	1669		1675	1686	1697	
18th century	1709		1715		1726	1737		1743		1754	1765		1771	1782	1793	1799
19th century	1805		1811		1822	1833	1839	—		1850	1861	1867	1878	1889	1895	
20th century	1901	1907	1918		1929	1935		1946		1957	1963		1974	1985	1991	
21st century	2002		2013	2019	—	2030		2041	2047	2058	2069		2075	2086	2097	
22nd century	2109		2115		2126	2137		2143		2154	2165		2171	2182	2193	2199
23rd century	2205		2211		2222	2233	2239	—		2250	2261	2267	2278	2289	2295	
24th century	2301	2307	2318		2329	2335		2346		2357	2363		2374	2385	2391	

400-year cycle
0–99	2	13	19	30	41	47	58	69	75	86	97
100–199	109	115	126	137	143	154	165	171	182	193	199
200–299	205	211	222	233	239	250	261	267	278	289	295
300–399	301	307	318	329	335	346	357	363	374	385	391

=== Julian Calendar ===
In the now-obsolete Julian calendar, the fourteen types of year (seven common, seven leap) repeat in a 28-year cycle (1461 weeks). A leap year has two adjoining dominical letters (one for January and February and the other for March to December in the Church of England as 29 February has no letter). Each of the seven two-letter sequences occurs once within a cycle, and every common letter thrice.

As the Julian calendar repeats after 28 years that means it will also repeat after 700 years, i.e. 25 cycles. The year's position in the cycle is given by the formula ((year + 8) mod 28) + 1). Years 7, 18 and 24 of the cycle are common years beginning on Tuesday. 2017 is year 10 of the cycle. Approximately 10.71% of all years are common years beginning on Tuesday.

Julian common years starting on Tuesday
Decade	1st		2nd		3rd		4th		5th		6th		7th		8th		9th		10th	
15th century	1409		1415		1426		1437		1443		1454		1465		1471		1482		1493	1499
16th century	1510		—		1521	1527	1538		1549		1555		1566		1577		1583		1594	
17th century	1605		1611		1622		1633	1639	1650		—		1661	1667	1678		1689		1695	
18th century	1706		1717		1723		1734		1745		1751		1762		1773	1779	1790		—	
19th century	1801	1807	1818		1829		1835		1846		1857		1863		1874		1885		1891	
20th century	1902		1913	1919	1930		—		1941	1947	1958		1969		1975		1986		1997	
21st century	2003		2014		2025		2031		2042		2053	2059	2070		—		2081	2087	2098	

== Holidays ==
=== International ===
- Valentine's Day falls on a Thursday
- World Day for Grandparents and the Elderly falls on its latest possible date, July 28
- Halloween falls on a Thursday
- Christmas Day falls on a Wednesday

=== Roman Catholic Solemnities ===
- Epiphany falls on a Sunday
- Candlemas falls on a Saturday
- Saint Joseph's Day falls on a Tuesday
- The Annunciation of Jesus falls on a Monday
- The Nativity of John the Baptist falls on a Monday
- The Solemnity of Saints Peter and Paul falls on a Saturday
- The Transfiguration of Jesus falls on a Tuesday
- The Assumption of Mary falls on a Thursday
- The Exaltation of the Holy Cross falls on a Saturday
- All Saints' Day falls on a Friday
- All Souls' Day falls on a Saturday
- The Feast of Christ the King falls on November 24 (or on October 27 in versions of the calendar between 1925 and 1962)
- The First Sunday of Advent falls on December 1
- The Immaculate Conception falls on a Sunday
- Gaudete Sunday falls on December 15
- Rorate Sunday falls on December 22

=== Australia and New Zealand ===
- Australia Day falls on a Saturday
- Waitangi Day falls on a Wednesday
- Daylight saving ends on its latest possible date, April 7
- ANZAC Day falls on a Thursday
- Mother's Day falls on May 12
- Father's Day falls on its earliest possible date, September 1
- Daylight saving begins on September 29 in New Zealand and October 6 in Australia

=== British Isles ===
- Saint David's Day falls on a Friday
- Mother's Day falls on March 3, March 10, March 17, March 24 or March 31
- Saint Patrick's Day falls on a Sunday
- Daylight saving begins on its latest possible date, March 31
- Saint George's Day falls on a Tuesday
- Father's Day falls on June 16
- Orangeman's Day falls on a Friday
- Daylight saving ends on October 27
- Guy Fawkes Night falls on a Tuesday
- Saint Andrew's Day falls on a Saturday

=== Canada ===
- Daylight saving begins on March 10
- Mother's Day falls on May 12
- Victoria Day falls on May 20
- Father's Day falls on June 16
- Canada Day falls on a Monday
- Labour Day falls on September 2
- Thanksgiving Day falls on its latest possible date, October 14
- Daylight saving ends on November 3

=== Denmark ===
- The Constitution Day falls on a Wednesday

=== Germany ===
- The reunification falls on a Thursday

=== United States ===
- Martin Luther King Jr. Day falls on its latest possible date, January 21.
- President's Day falls on February 18
- Daylight saving begins on March 10
- Mother's Day falls on May 12
- Memorial Day falls on May 27
- Father's Day falls on June 16
- Juneteenth falls on a Wednesday
- Independence Day falls on a Thursday
- Labor Day falls on September 2
- Grandparents' Day falls on September 8
- Columbus Day falls on its latest possible date, October 14
- Daylight saving ends on November 3
- Thanksgiving Day falls on its latest possible date, November 28
