= Common year starting on Wednesday =

A common year starting on Wednesday is any non-leap year (a year with 365 days) that begins on Wednesday, January 1, and ends on Wednesday, December 31. Its dominical letter hence is E. The most recent year of such kind was 2025, and the next one will be 2031, or, likewise, the current year 2026 and 2037 in the Julian calendar, see below for more. This common year is one of the three possible common years in which a century year can begin on, and occurs in century years that yield a remainder of 200 when divided by 400. The most recent such year was 1800, and the next one will be 2200.

Any common year that starts on Wednesday has only one Friday the 13th: the only one in this common year occurs in June. Leap years starting on Tuesday share this characteristic.

== Calendars ==
Calendar for any common year starting on Wednesday,
presented as common in many English-speaking areas

	January
Su	Mo	Tu	We	Th	Fr	Sa
			1	2	3	4
5	6	7	8	9	10	11
12	13	14	15	16	17	18
19	20	21	22	23	24	25
26	27	28	29	30	31

	February
Su	Mo	Tu	We	Th	Fr	Sa
						1
2	3	4	5	6	7	8
9	10	11	12	13	14	15
16	17	18	19	20	21	22
23	24	25	26	27	28

	March
Su	Mo	Tu	We	Th	Fr	Sa
						1
2	3	4	5	6	7	8
9	10	11	12	13	14	15
16	17	18	19	20	21	22
23	24	25	26	27	28	29
30	31

	April
Su	Mo	Tu	We	Th	Fr	Sa
		1	2	3	4	5
6	7	8	9	10	11	12
13	14	15	16	17	18	19
20	21	22	23	24	25	26
27	28	29	30

	May
Su	Mo	Tu	We	Th	Fr	Sa
				1	2	3
4	5	6	7	8	9	10
11	12	13	14	15	16	17
18	19	20	21	22	23	24
25	26	27	28	29	30	31

	June
Su	Mo	Tu	We	Th	Fr	Sa
1	2	3	4	5	6	7
8	9	10	11	12	13	14
15	16	17	18	19	20	21
22	23	24	25	26	27	28
29	30

	July
Su	Mo	Tu	We	Th	Fr	Sa
		1	2	3	4	5
6	7	8	9	10	11	12
13	14	15	16	17	18	19
20	21	22	23	24	25	26
27	28	29	30	31

	August
Su	Mo	Tu	We	Th	Fr	Sa
					1	2
3	4	5	6	7	8	9
10	11	12	13	14	15	16
17	18	19	20	21	22	23
24	25	26	27	28	29	30
31

	September
Su	Mo	Tu	We	Th	Fr	Sa
	1	2	3	4	5	6
7	8	9	10	11	12	13
14	15	16	17	18	19	20
21	22	23	24	25	26	27
28	29	30

	October
Su	Mo	Tu	We	Th	Fr	Sa
			1	2	3	4
5	6	7	8	9	10	11
12	13	14	15	16	17	18
19	20	21	22	23	24	25
26	27	28	29	30	31

	November
Su	Mo	Tu	We	Th	Fr	Sa
						1
2	3	4	5	6	7	8
9	10	11	12	13	14	15
16	17	18	19	20	21	22
23	24	25	26	27	28	29
30

	December
Su	Mo	Tu	We	Th	Fr	Sa
	1	2	3	4	5	6
7	8	9	10	11	12	13
14	15	16	17	18	19	20
21	22	23	24	25	26	27
28	29	30	31

ISO 8601-conformant calendar with week numbers for
any common year starting on Wednesday (dominical letter E)

	January
Wk	Mo	Tu	We	Th	Fr	Sa	Su
01			01	02	03	04	05
02	06	07	08	09	10	11	12
03	13	14	15	16	17	18	19
04	20	21	22	23	24	25	26
05	27	28	29	30	31

	February
Wk	Mo	Tu	We	Th	Fr	Sa	Su
05						01	02
06	03	04	05	06	07	08	09
07	10	11	12	13	14	15	16
08	17	18	19	20	21	22	23
09	24	25	26	27	28

	March
Wk	Mo	Tu	We	Th	Fr	Sa	Su
09						01	02
10	03	04	05	06	07	08	09
11	10	11	12	13	14	15	16
12	17	18	19	20	21	22	23
13	24	25	26	27	28	29	30
14	31

	April
Wk	Mo	Tu	We	Th	Fr	Sa	Su
14		01	02	03	04	05	06
15	07	08	09	10	11	12	13
16	14	15	16	17	18	19	20
17	21	22	23	24	25	26	27
18	28	29	30

	May
Wk	Mo	Tu	We	Th	Fr	Sa	Su
18				01	02	03	04
19	05	06	07	08	09	10	11
20	12	13	14	15	16	17	18
21	19	20	21	22	23	24	25
22	26	27	28	29	30	31

	June
Wk	Mo	Tu	We	Th	Fr	Sa	Su
22							01
23	02	03	04	05	06	07	08
24	09	10	11	12	13	14	15
25	16	17	18	19	20	21	22
26	23	24	25	26	27	28	29
27	30

	July
Wk	Mo	Tu	We	Th	Fr	Sa	Su
27		01	02	03	04	05	06
28	07	08	09	10	11	12	13
29	14	15	16	17	18	19	20
30	21	22	23	24	25	26	27
31	28	29	30	31

	August
Wk	Mo	Tu	We	Th	Fr	Sa	Su
31					01	02	03
32	04	05	06	07	08	09	10
33	11	12	13	14	15	16	17
34	18	19	20	21	22	23	24
35	25	26	27	28	29	30	31

	September
Wk	Mo	Tu	We	Th	Fr	Sa	Su
36	01	02	03	04	05	06	07
37	08	09	10	11	12	13	14
38	15	16	17	18	19	20	21
39	22	23	24	25	26	27	28
40	29	30

	October
Wk	Mo	Tu	We	Th	Fr	Sa	Su
40			01	02	03	04	05
41	06	07	08	09	10	11	12
42	13	14	15	16	17	18	19
43	20	21	22	23	24	25	26
44	27	28	29	30	31

	November
Wk	Mo	Tu	We	Th	Fr	Sa	Su
44						01	02
45	03	04	05	06	07	08	09
46	10	11	12	13	14	15	16
47	17	18	19	20	21	22	23
48	24	25	26	27	28	29	30

	December
Wk	Mo	Tu	We	Th	Fr	Sa	Su
49	01	02	03	04	05	06	07
50	08	09	10	11	12	13	14
51	15	16	17	18	19	20	21
52	22	23	24	25	26	27	28
01	29	30	31

== Applicable years ==
=== Gregorian Calendar ===
In the (currently used) Gregorian calendar, alongside Sunday, Monday, Friday or Saturday, the fourteen types of year (seven common, seven leap) repeat in a 400-year cycle (20871 weeks). Forty-three common years per cycle or exactly 10.75% start on a Wednesday. The 28-year sub-cycle only spans across century years divisible by 400, e.g. 1600, 2000, and 2400.

Gregorian common years starting on Wednesday
Decade	1st	2nd		3rd		4th	5th		6th		7th	8th		9th		10th	
16th century	prior to first adoption (proleptic)													1586		1597	
17th century	1603	1614		1625		1631	1642		1653	1659	1670	—		1681	1687	1698	
18th century	1710	—		1721	1727	1738	1749		1755		1766	1777		1783		1794	1800
19th century	1806	1817		1823		1834	1845		1851		1862	1873	1879	1890		—	
20th century	1902	1913	1919	1930		—	1941	1947	1958		1969	1975		1986		1997	
21st century	2003	2014		2025		2031	2042		2053	2059	2070	—		2081	2087	2098	
22nd century	2110	—		2121	2127	2138	2149		2155		2166	2177		2183		2194	2200
23rd century	2206	2217		2223		2234	2245		2251		2262	2273	2279	2290		—	
24th century	2302	2313	2319	2330		—	2341	2347	2358		2369	2375		2386		2397	

400-year cycle
0–99	3	14	25	31	42	53	59	70	81	87	98
100–199	110	121	127	138	149	155	166	177	183	194	
200–299	200	206	217	223	234	245	251	262	273	279	290
300–399	302	313	319	330	341	347	358	369	375	386	397

=== Julian Calendar ===
In the now-obsolete Julian calendar, the fourteen types of year (seven common, seven leap) repeat in a 28-year cycle (1461 weeks). A leap year has two adjoining dominical letters (one for January and February and the other for March to December, as 29 February has no letter). This sequence occurs exactly once within a cycle, and every common letter thrice.

As the Julian calendar repeats after 28 years that means it will also repeat after 700 years, i.e. 25 cycles. The year's position in the cycle is given by the formula ((year + 8) mod 28) + 1). Years 2, 8 and 19 of the cycle are common years beginning on Wednesday. 2017 is year 10 of the cycle. Approximately 10.71% of all years are common years beginning on Wednesday.

Julian common years starting on Wednesday
Decade	1st		2nd		3rd		4th		5th		6th		7th		8th		9th		10th	
15th century	1410		—		1421	1427	1438		1449		1455		1466		1477		1483		1494	
16th century	1505		1511		1522		1533	1539	1550		—		1561	1567	1578		1589		1595	
17th century	1606		1617		1623		1634		1645		1651		1662		1673	1679	1690		—	
18th century	1701	1707	1718		1729		1735		1746		1757		1763		1774		1785		1791	
19th century	1802		1813	1819	1830		—		1841	1847	1858		1869		1875		1886		1897	
20th century	1903		1914		1925		1931		1942		1953	1959	1970		—		1981	1987	1998	
21st century	2009		2015		2026		2037		2043		2054		2065		2071		2082		2093	2099

== Holidays ==
=== International ===
- Valentine's Day falls on a Friday
- World Day for Grandparents and the Elderly falls on July 27
- Halloween falls on a Friday
- Christmas Day falls on a Thursday

=== Roman Catholic Solemnities ===
- Epiphany falls on a Monday
- Candlemas falls on a Sunday
- Saint Joseph's Day falls on a Wednesday
- The Annunciation of Jesus falls on a Tuesday
- The Nativity of John the Baptist falls on a Tuesday
- The Solemnity of Saints Peter and Paul falls on a Sunday
- The Transfiguration of Jesus falls on a Wednesday
- The Assumption of Mary falls on a Friday
- The Exaltation of the Holy Cross falls on a Sunday
- All Saints' Day falls on a Saturday
- All Souls' Day falls on a Sunday
- The Feast of Christ the King falls on November 23 (or on October 26 in versions of the calendar between 1925 and 1962)
- The First Sunday of Advent falls on November 30
- The Immaculate Conception falls on a Monday
- Gaudete Sunday falls on December 14
- Rorate Sunday falls on December 21

=== Australia and New Zealand ===
- Australia Day falls on a Sunday
- Waitangi Day falls on a Thursday
- Daylight saving ends on April 6
- ANZAC Day falls on a Friday
- Mother's Day falls on May 11
- Father's Day falls on its latest possible date, September 7
- Daylight saving begins on September 28 in New Zealand and October 5 in Australia

=== British Isles ===
- Saint David's Day falls on a Saturday
- Mother's Day falls on March 2, March 9, March 16, March 23 or March 30
- Saint Patrick's Day falls on a Monday
- Daylight saving begins on March 30
- Saint George's Day falls on a Wednesday
- Father's Day falls on its earliest possible date, June 15
- Orangeman's Day falls on a Saturday
- Daylight saving ends on October 26
- Guy Fawkes Night falls on a Wednesday
- Saint Andrew's Day falls on a Sunday

=== Canada ===
- Daylight saving begins on March 9
- Mother's Day falls on May 11
- Victoria Day falls on May 19
- Father's Day falls on its earliest possible date, June 15
- Canada Day falls on a Tuesday
- Labour Day falls on its earliest possible date, September 1
- Thanksgiving Day falls on October 13
- Daylight saving ends on November 2

=== Denmark ===
- The Constitution Day falls on a Thursday

=== Germany ===
- The reunification falls on a Friday

=== United States ===
- Martin Luther King Jr. Day falls on January 20
- President's Day falls on February 17
- Daylight saving begins on March 9
- Mother's Day falls on May 11
- Memorial Day falls on May 26
- Father's Day falls on its earliest possible date, June 15
- Juneteenth falls on a Thursday
- Independence Day falls on a Friday
- Labor Day falls on its earliest possible date, September 1
- Grandparents' Day falls on its earliest possible date, September 7
- Columbus Day falls on October 13
- Daylight saving ends on November 2
- Thanksgiving Day falls on November 27
