= Monday demonstration =

Monday demonstrations may refer to:

- Monday demonstrations in East Germany in 1989 and 1990, peaceful anti-government protests
- Protests against Hartz IV reforms, in Germany, starting in 2004
