= Travel Tuesday =

Tuesday after the Thanksgiving holiday

Travel Tuesday, also known as Travel Deal Tuesday, is a marketing term for e-commerce transactions occurring on the Tuesday after Thanksgiving in the United States. It originated in 2017, when Hopper, an online flight marketplace, realized that the Tuesday after Thanksgiving was profitable for consumers to book flights. It is mainly a United States-based phenomenon. However, some overseas companies do recognize the holiday.

== History ==
In 2017, Hopper, an online flight marketplace, created Travel Tuesday after realizing that in the post-Thanksgiving shopping period, the Tuesday after Thanksgiving was the most profitable time for consumers to book flights. Since then, major airline providers such as Orbitz, Travelocity, and CheapTickets have recognized the holiday. However, outside the United States, the holiday is rarely celebrated.

== Impact ==
In 2018, Hopper stated that for them, the day offered the highest airfare sales in 2017, also noting that compared to Cyber Monday and Black Friday, fares were somewhat cheaper. In 2022, flight sales because of Travel Tuesday were thrice as much compared to the sales in the rest of the post-Thanksgiving period.
