= Tuesday =

Day of the week

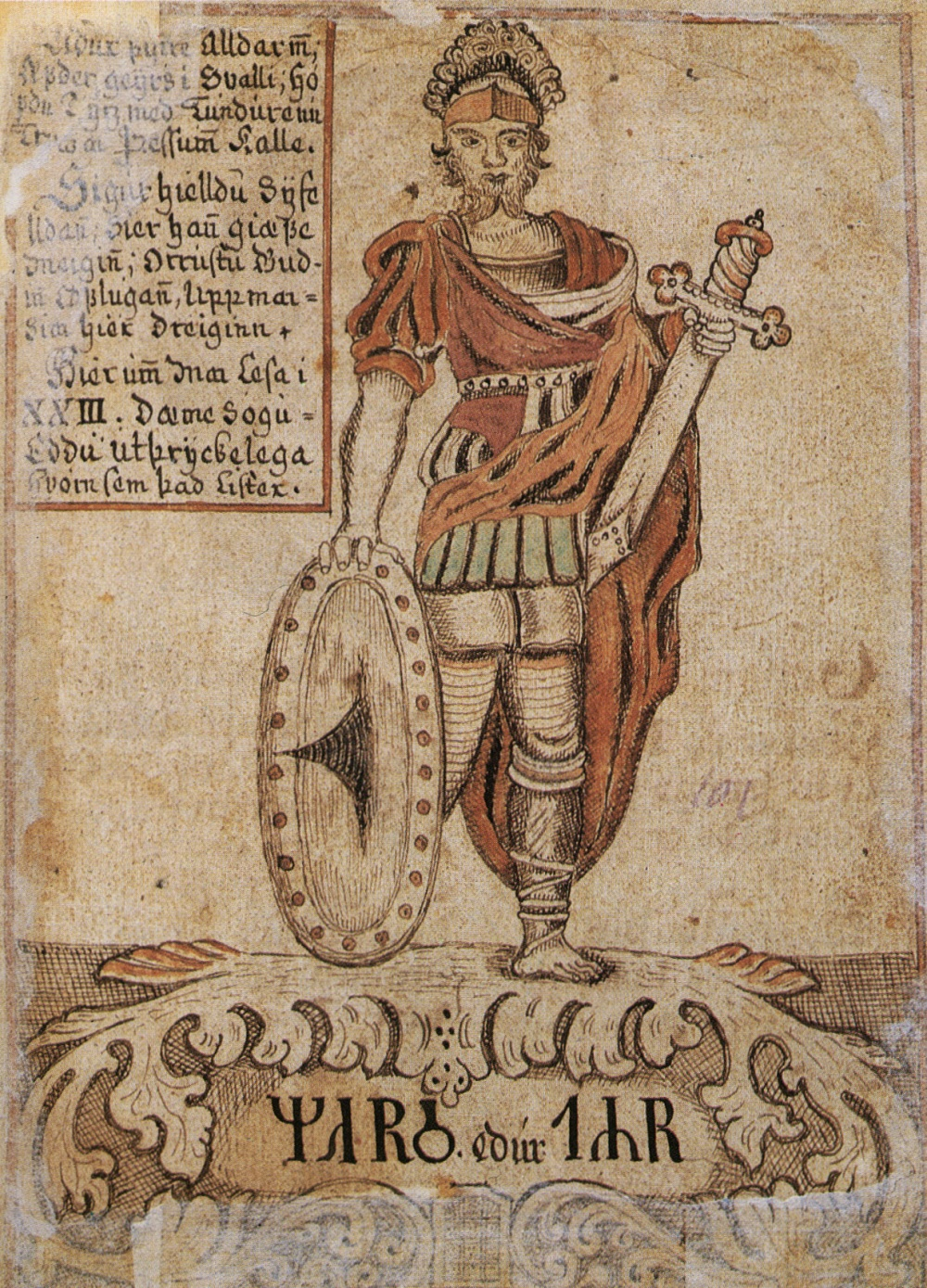
The god Týr or Tiw, identified with Mars, after whom Tuesday is named. Icelandic National Library, Reykjavík.

Tuesday is the day of the week between Monday and Wednesday. According to international standard ISO 8601, Monday is the first day of the week; thus, Tuesday is the second day of the week. According to many traditional calendars, however, Sunday is the first day of the week, so Tuesday is the third day of the week. In some Muslim countries, Saturday is the first day of the week and thus Tuesday is the fourth day of the week.

The English name is derived from Middle English Tewesday, from Old English Tiwesdæg meaning "Tīw's Day", the day of Tiw or Týr, the god of single combat, law, and justice in Norse mythology. Tiw was equated with Mars in the interpretatio germanica, and "Tīw's Day" is a translation of Latin dies Martis.

== Etymology ==
The name Tuesday derives from the Old English Tiwesdæg and literally means "Tiw's Day". Tiw is the Old English form of the Proto-Germanic god *Tîwaz, or Týr in Old Norse. *Tîwaz derives from the Proto-Indo-European base *dei-, *deyā-, *dīdyā-, meaning 'to shine', whence come such words as "deity".

The German Dienstag and Dutch dinsdag are derived from the Germanic custom of the thing, as Tiw / Týr also had a strong connection to the thing.

The Latin name dies Martis ("day of Mars") is equivalent to the Greek ἡμέρα Ἄρεως (hēméra Áreōs, "day of Ares"). In most languages with Latin origins (Italian, French, Spanish, Catalan, Romanian, Galician, Sardinian, Corsican, but not Portuguese), the day is named after Mars, the Roman parallel of the Ancient Greek Ares (Ἄρης).

In some Slavic languages the word Tuesday originated from Old Church Slavonic word въторъ meaning "the second". Bulgarian and Russian Вторник (Vtornik) (Serbian: уторак utorak) is derived from the Bulgarian and Russian adjective for 'second' – Втори (Vtori) or Второй (Vtoroi).

In Japanese, the second day of the week is 火曜日 (kayōbi), from 火星 (kasei), the planet Mars. Similarly, in Korean the word Tuesday is 화요일 (hwa yo il), means literally fire day, and Mars the planet is referred to as the fire star with the same words, but this is unrelated to the Roman god Mars, which is referred to phonetically as Mars.

In the Indo-Aryan languages Pali and Sanskrit the name of the day is taken from Angaraka ('one who is red in colour'), a style (manner of address) for Mangala, the god of war, and for Mars, the red planet.

In the Nahuatl language, Tuesday is Huītzilōpōchtōnal (Nahuatl pronunciation: [wiːt͡siloːpoːt͡ʃˈtoːnaɬ]) meaning "day of Huitzilopochtli".

In Arabic, Tuesday is الثلاثاء (al-Thulatha'), and in Hebrew it is יום שלישי (Yom Shlishi), meaning "third day". When added after the word يوم / יום (yom or youm) it means "the third day".

== Religious observances ==
In the Eastern Orthodox Church, Tuesdays are dedicated to Saint John the Baptist. The Octoechos contains hymns on this theme, arranged in an eight-week cycle, that are chanted on Tuesdays throughout the year. At the end of Divine Services on Tuesday, the dismissal begins with the words: "May Christ our True God, through the intercessions of his most-pure Mother, of the honorable and glorious Prophet, Forerunner and Baptist John…"

In Hinduism, Tuesday is a popular day for worshipping and praying to Hanuman and Kartikeya, some also worship Kali, Durga, Parvati, and Ganesha. Many Hindus fast during Tuesday. Many Hindu married women also observe the Mangala Gauri Vrat of fasting every Tuesday in the Hindu month of Shravana, as the month is dedicated to Gauri and Shiva. Tuesday is also viewed as the day ruled by Mangala (Mars) in Hinduism.

== Cultural references ==
In the Greek world, Tuesday (the day of the week of the Fall of Constantinople) is considered an unlucky day. The same is true in the Spanish-speaking world; it is believed that this is due to the association between Tuesday and Mars, the god of war and therefore related to death. For both Greeks and Spanish-speakers, the 13th of the month is considered unlucky if it falls on Tuesday, instead of Friday. In Judaism, on the other hand, Tuesday is considered a particularly lucky day, because in Bereshit (parashah), known in the Christian tradition as the first chapters of Genesis, the paragraph about this day contains the phrase "it was good" twice.

In the Thai solar calendar, the day is named for the Pali word for the planet Mars, which also means "Ashes of the Dead"; the color associated with Tuesday is pink.

In the folk rhyme Monday's Child, "Tuesday's child is full of grace".

== Common occurrences ==
=== United States ===
Tuesday is the usual day for elections in the United States. Federal elections take place on the Tuesday after the first Monday in November; this date was established by a law of 1845 for presidential elections (specifically for the selection of the Electoral College), and was extended to elections for the House of Representatives in 1875 and for the Senate in 1914. Tuesday was the earliest day of the week which was practical for polling in the early 19th century: citizens might have to travel for a whole day to cast their vote, and would not wish to leave on Sunday which was a day of worship for the great majority of them. However, a bill was introduced in 2012 to move elections to weekends, with a co-sponsor stating that "by moving Election Day from a single day in the middle of the workweek to a full weekend, we are encouraging more working Americans to participate. Our democracy will be best served when our leaders are elected by as many Americans as possible."

Video games are commonly released on Tuesdays in the United States; this fact is often attributed to the Sonic the Hedgehog 2 "Sonic 2s day" marketing campaign in 1992. DVDs and Blu-rays are released on Tuesdays. Albums were typically released on Tuesdays as well, but this has changed to Fridays globally in 2015.

=== Australia ===
In Australia, the board of the Reserve Bank of Australia meets on the first Tuesday of every month except January. The federal government hands down the federal budget on the second Tuesday in May, the practice since 1994 (except in 1996 and 2016). The Melbourne Cup is held each year on the first Tuesday in November.

== Astrology ==
In astrology, Tuesday is aligned by the planet Mars and the astrological signs of Aries and Scorpio.

== Named days ==
- Black Tuesday, in the United States, refers to Tuesday, October 29, 1929, part of the great Stock Market Crash of 1929. This was the Tuesday after Black Thursday.
- Easter Tuesday is the Tuesday within the Octave of Easter.
- Holy Tuesday is the Tuesday of Holy Week, preceding Easter. It commemorates the return of Jesus to Jerusalem from Bethany and the Cursing of the fig tree.
- Patch Tuesday is the second Tuesday of every month when Microsoft releases patches for their products. Some system administrators call this day Black Tuesday.
- Shrove Tuesday (also called Mardi Gras – Fat Tuesday) precedes the first day of Lent in the Western Christian calendar.
- Super Tuesday is the day many American states hold their presidential primary elections.
- Twosday (portmanteau of two and Tuesday) is the name given to Tuesday, February 22, 2022, and an unofficial one-time secular observance held on that day.
- Travel Tuesday is an unofficial observance occurring the Tuesday after Thanksgiving.
- Giving Tuesday, or #GivingTuesday, is a day encouraging people to do good and a global movement to promote generosity. It takes place on the Tuesday following Black Friday and was launched in 2012 in the United States.
