= Monday =

Day of the week

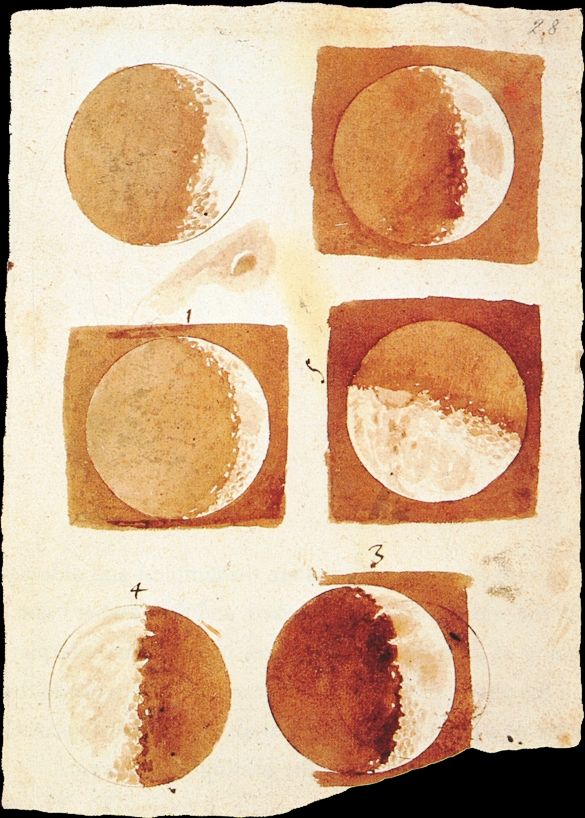
Galileo's 1616 drawings of the Moon and its phases. Monday is named after the Moon in many languages.

Monday is the day of the week that takes place between Sunday and Tuesday. According to the International Organization for Standardization's ISO 8601 standard, it is the first day of the week.

== Names ==
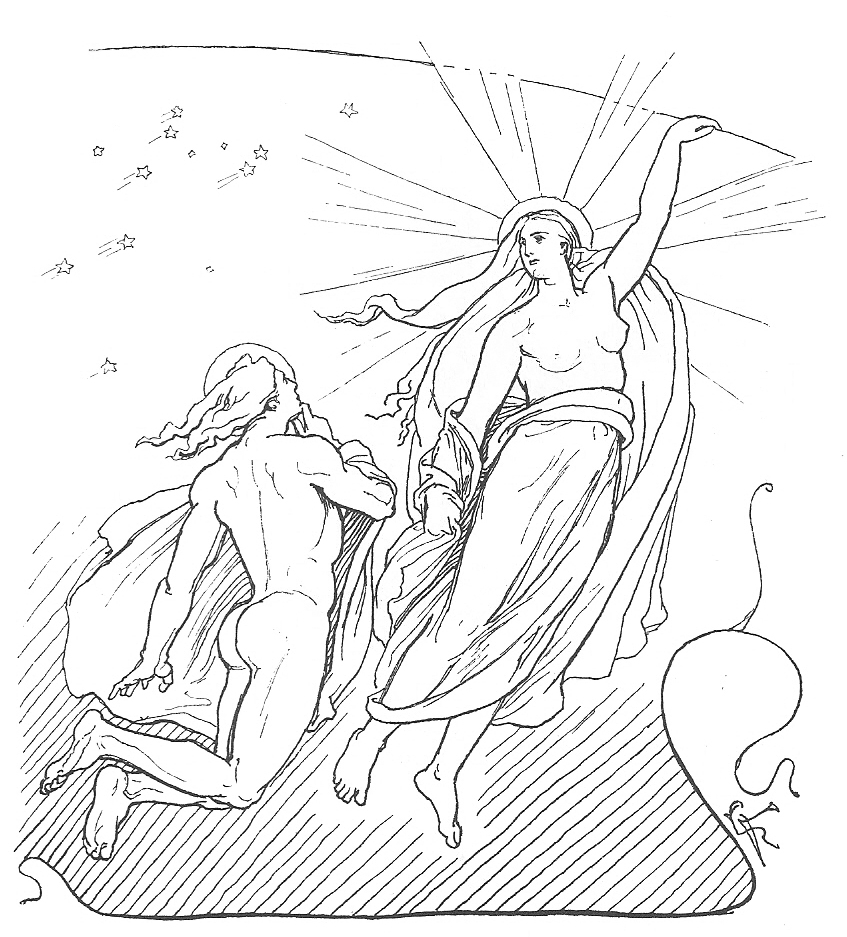
A depiction of Máni, the personified moon, and his sister Sól, the personified sun, from Norse mythology (1895) by Lorenz Frølich

The names of the day of the week were coined in the Roman era, in Greek and Latin, in the case of Monday as ἡμέρᾱ Σελήνης (romanized: "hemera Selenes"), diēs Lūnae "day of the Moon".

Many languages use either terms directly derived from these names or loan translations based on them. The English noun Monday derived sometime before 1200 from monedæi, which developed from the Old English term (around 1000) mōnandæg and mōndæg, literally meaning "moon's day". This has cognates in other Germanic languages, including the Old Frisian mōnadeig, Middle Low German and Middle Dutch mānendag, mānendach (modern Dutch Maandag), Old High German mānetag (modern German Montag), and Old Norse mánadagr (Swedish and Norwegian nynorsk måndag, Icelandic mánudagur. Danish and Norwegian bokmål mandag). The Germanic term is a Germanic interpretation of Latin lunae dies ("day of the moon").

Japanese and Korean share the same ancient Chinese words '月曜日' (Hiragana:げつようび, translit. getsuyо̄bi, Hangeul:월요일) for Monday which means "day of the moon". In many Indo-Aryan languages, the word for Monday is Somavāra or Chandravāra, Sanskrit loan-translations of "Monday".

In some cases, the "ecclesiastical" names are used. This is a tradition of numbering the days of the week as to avoid the pagan connotation of the planetary or deities' names, and to keep with the biblical name, in which Monday is the "second day". Examples are: Hebrew יום שני, Greek Δευτέρα ἡμέρα (Deutéra hēméra), Latin feria secunda, Arabic الأثنين (al-isnain).

In many Slavic languages the name of the day translates to "after Sunday/holiday". Russian понедельник (ponyedyelnik) literally translated, Monday means "next to the week", по "next to" or "on" недельник "(the) week" Croatian and Bosnian ponedjeljak, Serbian понедељак (ponedeljak), Ukrainian понеділок (ponedilok), Bulgarian понеделник (ponedelnik), Polish poniedziałek, Czech pondělí, Slovak pondelok, Slovenian ponedeljek. In Turkish it is called pazartesi, which also means "after Sunday".

== Arrangement in the week ==
Historically, the Greco-Roman week began with Sunday (dies solis), and Monday (dies lunae) was the second day of the week. It is still the custom to refer to Monday as feria secunda in the liturgical calendar of the Catholic Church. Quakers also traditionally referred to Monday as "Second Day".

The Portuguese and the Greek Eastern Orthodox Church also retain the ecclesiastical tradition (Portuguese segunda-feira, Greek Δευτέρα "deutéra" "second"). Vietnamese, whose Latin-based alphabet was originally romanized by Portuguese Jesuit missionaries, adopted this convention and thus also refers to Monday as Second Day (thứ Hai). Likewise, the Modern Hebrew name for Monday is yom-sheni (יום שני).

While in North America, Sunday is the first day of the week, the Geneva-based International Organization for Standardization places Monday as the first day of the week in its ISO 8601 standard. Monday is xīngqīyī (星期一) in Chinese, meaning "day one of the week".

== Religious observances ==
=== Christianity ===
The early Christian Didache warned believers not to fast on Mondays to avoid Judaizing (see below), and suggested fasting on Wednesdays instead.

Monday is the day in which is celebrated Easter Monday, the day after Easter Sunday and the second day of Eastertide. Easter Monday is a public holiday in many Christian countries. In Western Christianity it marks the second day of the Octave of Easter; in Eastern Christianity it marks the second day of Bright Week.

In the Eastern Orthodox Church, Mondays are days on which the Angels are commemorated. The Octoechos contains hymns on this theme, arranged in an eight-week cycle, which are chanted on Mondays throughout the year. At the end of Divine Services on Mondays, the dismissal begins with the words: "May Christ our True God, through the intercessions, of his most-pure Mother, of the honorable, Bodiless Powers (i.e., the angels) of Heaven…".

In many Eastern monasteries Mondays are observed as fast days. Because Mondays are dedicated to the angels, and monks strive to live an angelic life. In these monasteries, the monks abstain from meat, fowl, dairy products, fish, wine and oil. If a feast day occurs on a Monday, fish, wine and oil may be allowed, depending upon the particular feast.

Members of the Church of Jesus Christ of Latter-day Saints spend one evening per week, called Family Home Evening (FHE) or Family Night. This is usually a Monday, when families are encouraged to spend time together in study, prayer and other family activities.

=== Hinduism ===
In Hinduism, Mondays are associated with the Hindu god of the moon Chandra or Soma. In several South Asian languages, Monday is knowns as Somavara or Somavaram. Hindus who fast on Mondays do so in dedication to the deity Shiva. Some observe the Solah Somvar Vrat, which is a fast of sixteen Mondays dedicated to Shiva in hopes of getting married and finding a suitable partner. Fasting on Mondays in the Hindu month of Shravana is also considered auspicious as it is one of the holiest months to Hindus and dedicated to Shiva and his consort Parvati.

=== Islam ===
In Islam, Mondays are one of the days in a week in which Muslims are encouraged to do voluntary fasting, the other being Thursdays.

There are a number of Hadith which narrated of Muhammad fasting on these days. According to the same Hadith, Muhammad was born on a Monday. It is also narrated that he received his first revelation (which would later become the Quran) on Monday.

=== Judaism ===
In Judaism, Mondays are considered auspicious days for fasting.

In Judaism, a small portion of the weekly Parashah in Torah is read in public on Monday and Thursday mornings, as a supplement for the Saturday reading). Special penitential prayers are recited on Monday unless there is a special occasion for happiness which cancels them. According to the Mishna and Talmud, these traditions are due to Monday and Thursday being "the market days" when people gathered from the towns to the city.

A tradition of Ashkenazi Jews to voluntarily fast on the first consecutive Monday, Thursday and Monday of the Hebrew month is prevalent among the ultra-orthodox.

In Hebrew, Monday is called "Yom Shení", literally meaning "Second Day", following the biblical reference to the sabbath day as the "Seventh-day" and the tradition of that day being on Saturday. It has been established that the phonetic and cultural link between the planet Saturn, Saturday and the Sabbath day is of ancient Mesopotamian origin.

== Cultural references ==
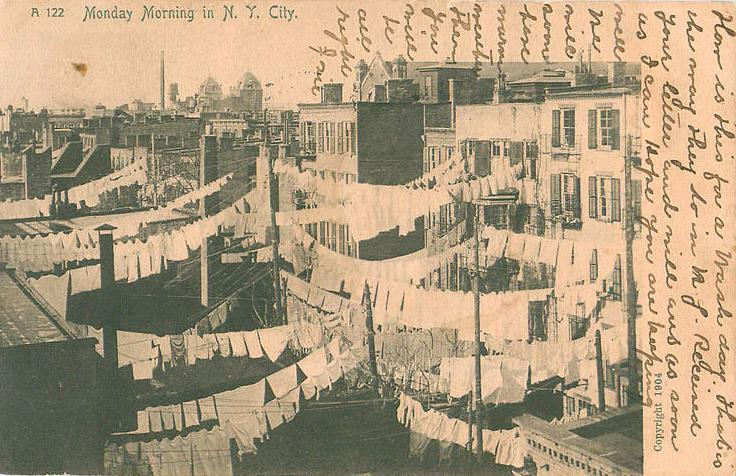
This postcard, sent in 1907 and captioned "Monday Morning in N. Y. City", reflects the tradition of Monday as a day for washing clothes.

A number of popular songs in Western culture portray Mondays often as days of depression, anxiety, avolition, hysteria, or melancholy, mostly because of its association with the first day of the workweek. Mondays are also portrayed as days of boredom and bad luck, especially for many people in their school years, who have to go back to school every Monday after having no school on Saturday and Sunday, which can make them grow a hatred for Mondays. A 2021 YouGov poll found that 58% of Americans found Monday to be their least favorite day of the week., and in 2022, Guinness World Records announced on Twitter that Monday is the "worst day of the week".

For example, "Monday, Monday" (1966) from the Mamas & the Papas; "Rainy Days and Mondays" (1971) from the Carpenters; Monday, Monday, Monday (2002) from Tegan and Sara; and "Manic Monday" (1986) from the Bangles (written by Prince).

There is a band named the Happy Mondays and an American pop-punk band Hey Monday.

The popular comic strip character Garfield by Jim Davis is well known for his hatred for Mondays, mostly accompanied by the catchphrase "I hate Mondays."

In the United Kingdom, more people commit suicide in England and Wales on Mondays than other days of the week. More people in the UK in general call in sick on Mondays.

In July 2002, the consulting firm PricewaterhouseCoopers announced that it would rename its consultancy practice "Monday", and would spend $110 million over the next year to establish the brand. When IBM acquired the consultancy three months later it chose not to retain the new name.

2006 UK research found that serious heart attacks are more likely to occur on a Monday, compared to other days of the week.

== Named days ==
- Big Monday – American live sports television series
- Black Monday
- Blue Monday – Supposed saddest day of the year
- Clean Monday (Ash Monday)
- Cyber Monday – Monday after the Thanksgiving holiday
- Easter Monday, also Bright Monday or Wet Monday
- Holy Monday, Monday before Easter Sunday
- Handsel Monday – Scotland traditional celebration
- Lundi Gras – Shrove Monday events during Mardi Gras
- Mad Monday – Celebrations after Australian football
- Miracle Monday – Book by Elliot S. Maggin
- Plough Monday – Traditional English start of the agricultural year
- Shrove Monday – Monday before Ash Wednesday
- Wet Monday – Celebration held on Easter Monday in Poland and Central Europe
- Whit Monday – Holiday celebrated the day after Pentecost

== See also ==
- Monday Club – Political pressure group in the UK
- Monday demonstrations
- Monday Night Football – Live television broadcast of weekly National Football League (NFL) games
- Monday Night Raw – Professional wrestling television program
- WCW Monday Nitro
- Monday Night War – Era of professional wrestling (1995–2001)
- Saint Monday – Tradition of absenteeism on a Monday
- Cleveland Elementary School shooting (San Diego) – 1979 mass shooting in San Diego, California, U.S., purportedly carried out due to dislike for Mondays
