= Common year =

Calendar year with 365 days

A common year is a calendar year with 365 days, as distinguished from a leap year, which has 366 days. More generally, a common year is one without intercalation. The Gregorian calendar, used by the majority of the world, employs both common years and leap years. This is to keep the calendar aligned with the tropical year, which does not contain an exact number of days. A common year is approximately a quarter day (six hours) shorter than a tropical year, which has 365.24 days. If the Gregorian calendar only used common years and omitted leap years, the calendar would be out of sync with the tropical year by approximately 24 days in 100 years.

In the Gregorian calendar, 303 out of every 400 years are common years. Leap years are any years that are divisible by 4, unless they are also divisible by 100 and not 400, in which case it is a common year. The extra common years are added to account for the fact that common years are 5 hours, 48 minutes, and 46 seconds shorter than a tropical year, rather than six hours exactly. By comparison, in the Julian calendar, 300 out of every 400 years are common years, with every fourth year being a leap year without exception.

The common year has 52 weeks and one day, hence a common year always begins and ends on the same day of the week (for instance, January 1 and December 31 both fall on a Thursday in 2026) and the year following a common year will start on the subsequent day of the week. As a result, if the following year is a common year as well, each date will advance by one day of the week. For instance, March 1, 2025, fell on a Saturday, then it falls on a Sunday in 2026 and Monday in 2027. If the following year is a leap year, then dates from January 1 to February 28 will still advance by one day, but all subsequent dates will advance by two days (for instance, March 1 falls on a Monday in 2027 and Wednesday in 2028), due to the additional day.

== Calendars ==
- Common year starting on Sunday
- Common year starting on Monday
- Common year starting on Tuesday
- Common year starting on Wednesday
- Common year starting on Thursday
- Common year starting on Friday
- Common year starting on Saturday
