= Wednesday =

Day of the week

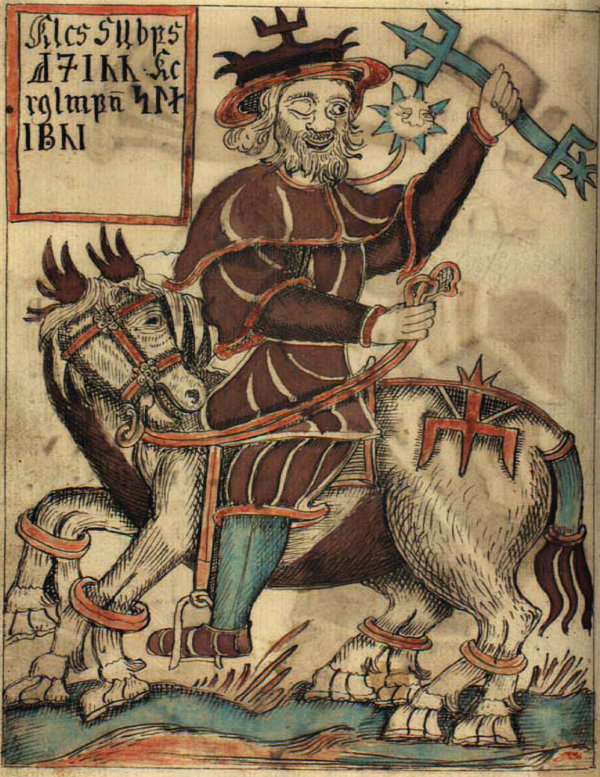
The Norse god Odin or Wōden, in an 18th-century Icelandic manuscript, after whom Wednesday is named

Wednesday is the day of the week in-between Tuesday and Thursday. According to international standard ISO 8601, it is the third day of the week. However, in countries that adopt the traditional "Sunday first" convention, where Sunday is the first day of the week, it is the fourth day of the week.

In English, the name is derived from Old English Wōdnesdæg and Middle English Wednesdei, 'day of Woden', reflecting the religion practiced by the Anglo-Saxons, the English equivalent to the Norse god Odin. In many Romance languages, such as the French mercredi, Spanish miércoles or Italian mercoledì, the day's name is a calque of Latin dies Mercurii 'day of Mercury'.

Wednesday is in the middle of the common Western five-day workweek that starts on Monday and finishes on Friday.

== Etymology ==
The name Wednesday continues Middle English Wednesdei. Old English had wōdnesdæg (“Woden’s day”), which would be expected to continue as Wodnesday. Old Frisian also attests a form wednesdei. By the Middle English period, the spelling Wednesday developed through analogical and orthographic changes rather than direct phonological inheritance.

The name is a calque of the Latin dies Mercurii 'day of Mercury', reflecting the fact that the Germanic god Woden (Wodanaz or Odin) during the Roman era was interpreted as "Germanic Mercury".

The Latin name dates to the late 2nd or early 3rd century. It is a calque of Greek ἡμέρα Ἕρμου (heméra Hérmou), a term first attested, together with the system of naming the seven weekdays after the seven classical planets, in the Anthologiarum by Vettius Valens (c. AD 170).

The Latin name is reflected directly in the weekday name in most modern Romance languages: mércuris (Sardinian), mercredi (French), mercoledì (Italian), miércoles (Spanish), miercuri (Romanian), dimecres (Catalan), marcuri or mercuri (Corsican), mèrcore (Venetian). In Welsh it is Dydd Mercher, meaning 'Mercury's Day'.

The Dutch name for the day, woensdag, has the same etymology as English Wednesday; it comes from Middle Dutch wodenesdag, woedensdag ('Wodan's day').

The German name for the day, Mittwoch (literally: 'mid-week'), replaced the former name Wodenstag ('Wodan's day') in the 10th century. Similarly, the Yiddish word for Wednesday is מיטוואך (mitvokh), meaning and sounding a lot like the German word it came from.

Most Slavic languages follow this pattern and use derivations of 'the middle' (Belarusian серада serada, Bulgarian сряда sryada, Croatian srijeda, Bosnian (srijeda) Czech středa, Macedonian среда sreda, Polish środa, Russian среда sredá, Serbian среда sreda or cриједа srijeda, Slovak streda, Slovene sreda, Ukrainian середа sereda). The Finnish name is keskiviikko ('middle of the week'), as is the Icelandic name: miðvikudagur, and the Faroese name: mikudagur ('mid-week day'). Some dialects of Faroese have ónsdagur, though, which shares etymology with Wednesday. Danish, Norwegian, Swedish onsdag, (Ons-dag meaning Odens dag 'Odin's day').

In Japanese, the word for Wednesday is 水曜日 (sui youbi) meaning 'water day' and is associated with 水星 (suisei): Mercury (the planet), literally meaning 'water star'. Similarly, in Korean the word for Wednesday is 수요일; su yo il, also meaning 'water day'.

In most of the languages of India, the word for Wednesday is Budhavāra — vāra meaning 'day' and Budha being the planet Mercury.

In Armenian (Չորեքշաբթի chorekshabti), Georgian (ოთხშაბათი otkhshabati), Turkish (çarşamba), and Tajik (chorshanbiyev) languages the word literally means 'four (days) from Saturday' originating from Persian (چهارشنبه cheharshanbeh).

Portuguese uses the word quarta-feira, meaning 'fourth day', while in Greek the word is Tetarti (Τετάρτη) meaning simply 'fourth'. Similarly, Arabic أربعاء means 'fourth', Hebrew רביעי means 'fourth', and Persian چهارشنبه means 'fourth day'. Yet the name for the day in Estonian kolmapäev, Lithuanian trečiadienis, and Latvian trešdiena means 'third day' while in Mandarin Chinese 星期三 (xīngqīsān), means 'day three', as Sunday is unnumbered.

== Religious observances ==
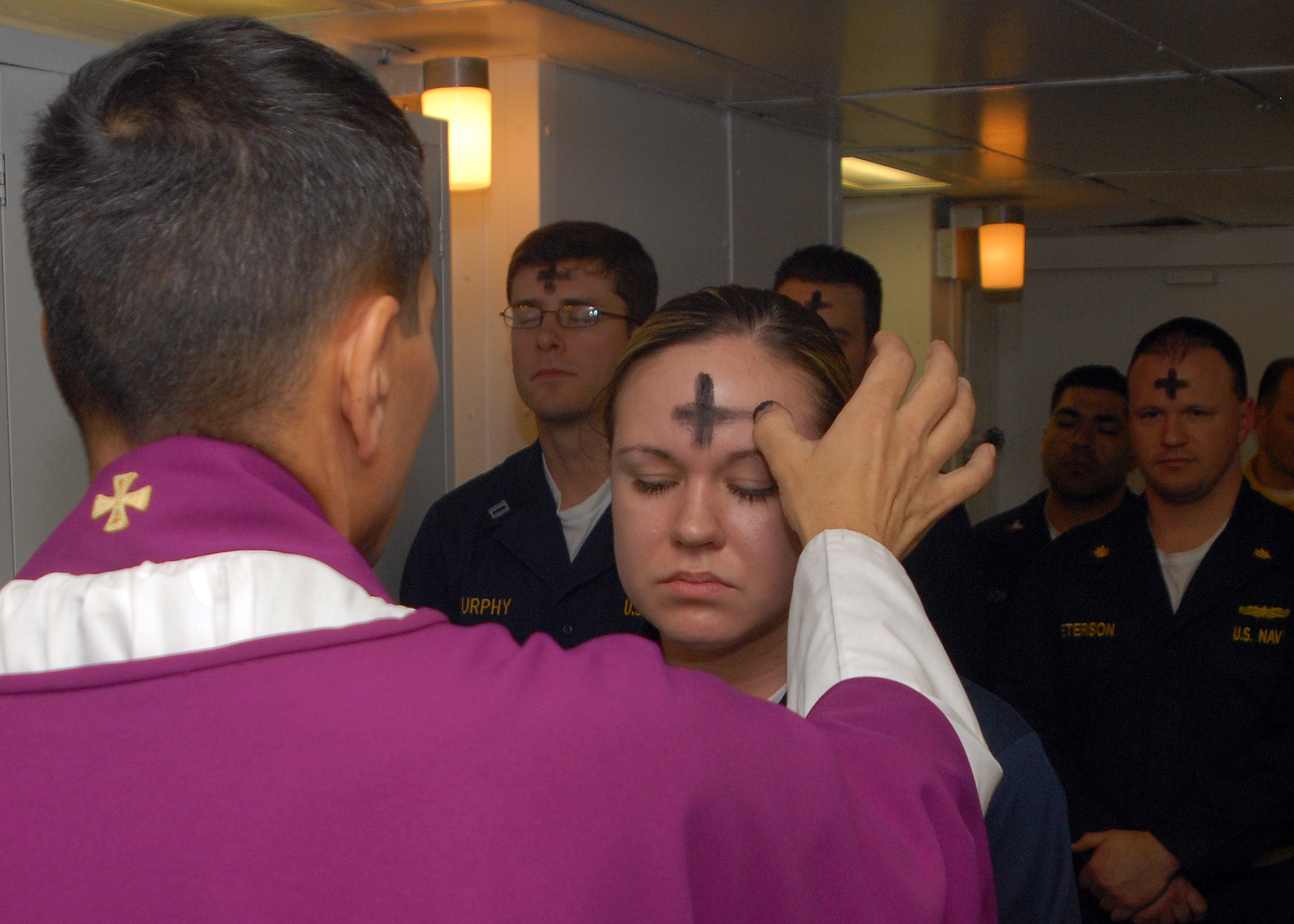
The imposition of ashes on Ash Wednesday

The Creation narrative in the Hebrew Bible places the creation of the Sun and Moon on "the fourth day" of the divine workweek.

Quakers traditionally referred to Wednesday as "Fourth Day" to avoid the pagan associations with the name "Wednesday", or in keeping with the practice of treating each day as equally divine.

The Eastern Orthodox Church observes Wednesday (as well as Friday) as a fast day throughout the year (with the exception of several fast-free periods during the year). Fasting on Wednesday and Fridays entails abstinence from meat or animal products (i.e., four-footed animals), poultry and dairy products. Unless a feast day occurs on a Wednesday, the Orthodox also abstain from fish, from using oil in their cooking and from alcoholic beverages (there is some debate over whether abstention from oil involves all cooking oil or only olive oil).

For the Orthodox, Wednesdays and Fridays throughout the year commemorate the betrayal of Jesus (Wednesday) and the Crucifixion of Christ (Friday). There are hymns in the Octoekhos which reflect this liturgically. These include special Theotokia (hymns to the Mother of God) called Stavrotheotokia ('Cross-Theotokia'). The dismissal at the end of services on Wednesday begins with these words: "May Christ our true God, through the power of the precious and life-giving cross...."

In Irish and Scottish Gaelic, the name for Wednesday also refers to fasting, as it is Dé Céadaoin in Irish Gaelic and Di-Ciadain in Scottish Gaelic, which comes from chéad, meaning 'first', and aoine, meaning 'fasting', which combined means 'first day of fasting'.

In American culture many Catholic and Protestant churches schedule study or prayer meetings on Wednesday nights. The sports calendar in many American public schools reflects this, reserving Mondays and Thursdays for girls' games and Tuesdays and Fridays for boys' games while generally avoiding events on Wednesday evening.

In the Catholic devotion of the Holy Rosary, the glorious mysteries are meditated on Wednesday and also Sunday throughout the year.

Wednesday is the day of the week devoted by the Catholic tradition to Saint Joseph.

In Hinduism, Budha is the god of Mercury, Wednesday, and of merchants and merchandise. Krishna, Vithoba, and Ganesha are also worshipped on Wednesday.

== Cultural usage ==
According to the Thai solar calendar, the color associated with Wednesday is green.

In the folk rhyme Monday's Child, "Wednesday's child is full of woe". In the rhyme Solomon Grundy, Grundy was "married on Wednesday". In Winnie the Pooh and the Blustery Day, the disagreeable nature of the weather is attributed to it being "Winds-Day" (a play on Wednesday). In Richard Brautigan's In Watermelon Sugar Wednesday is the day when the sun shines grey. Wednesday Friday Addams is a member of the fictional family The Addams Family. Her name is derived from the idea that Wednesday's child is full of woe.

Wednesday sometimes appears as a character's name in literary works. These include Thursday's fictions by Richard James Allen, Wednesday Next from the Thursday Next series by Jasper Fforde and Neil Gaiman's novel American Gods. In the 1945 John Steinbeck novel Sweet Thursday, the titular day is preceded by "Lousy Wednesday".

Wednesday is sometimes informally referred to as "hump day" in North America, a reference to the fact that Wednesday is the middle day—or "hump"—of a typical work week. Lillördag, or "little Saturday", is a Nordic tradition of turning Wednesday evening into a small weekend-like celebration. Humpday is also a name of a 2009 film.

In Poland, Wednesday night is often referred by young people as "vodka-time", after a song of that name by Bartosz Walaszek "Środowa noc to wódy czas."

== Astrology ==
The astrological sign of the planet Mercury, ☿, represents Wednesday—dies Mercurii to the Romans, it had similar names in Latin-derived languages, such as the Italian mercoledì (dì means 'day'), the French mercredi, and the Spanish miércoles. In English, this became "Woden's Day", since the Roman god Mercury was identified by Woden in Northern Europe and it is especially aligned by the astrological signs of Gemini and Virgo.

== Named days ==
- Ash Wednesday, the first day of Lent in the Western Christian tradition, occurs forty-six days before Easter (forty, not counting Sundays).
- Black Wednesday, the day of a financial crisis in the United Kingdom
- Holy Wednesday, sometimes called Spy Wednesday in allusion to the betrayal of Jesus by Judas Iscariot, is the Wednesday immediately preceding Easter.
- Wednesday at the beginning of April or Red Wednesday, the Yezidi New Year festival celebrated in Iraq
