= Saturday =

Day of the week

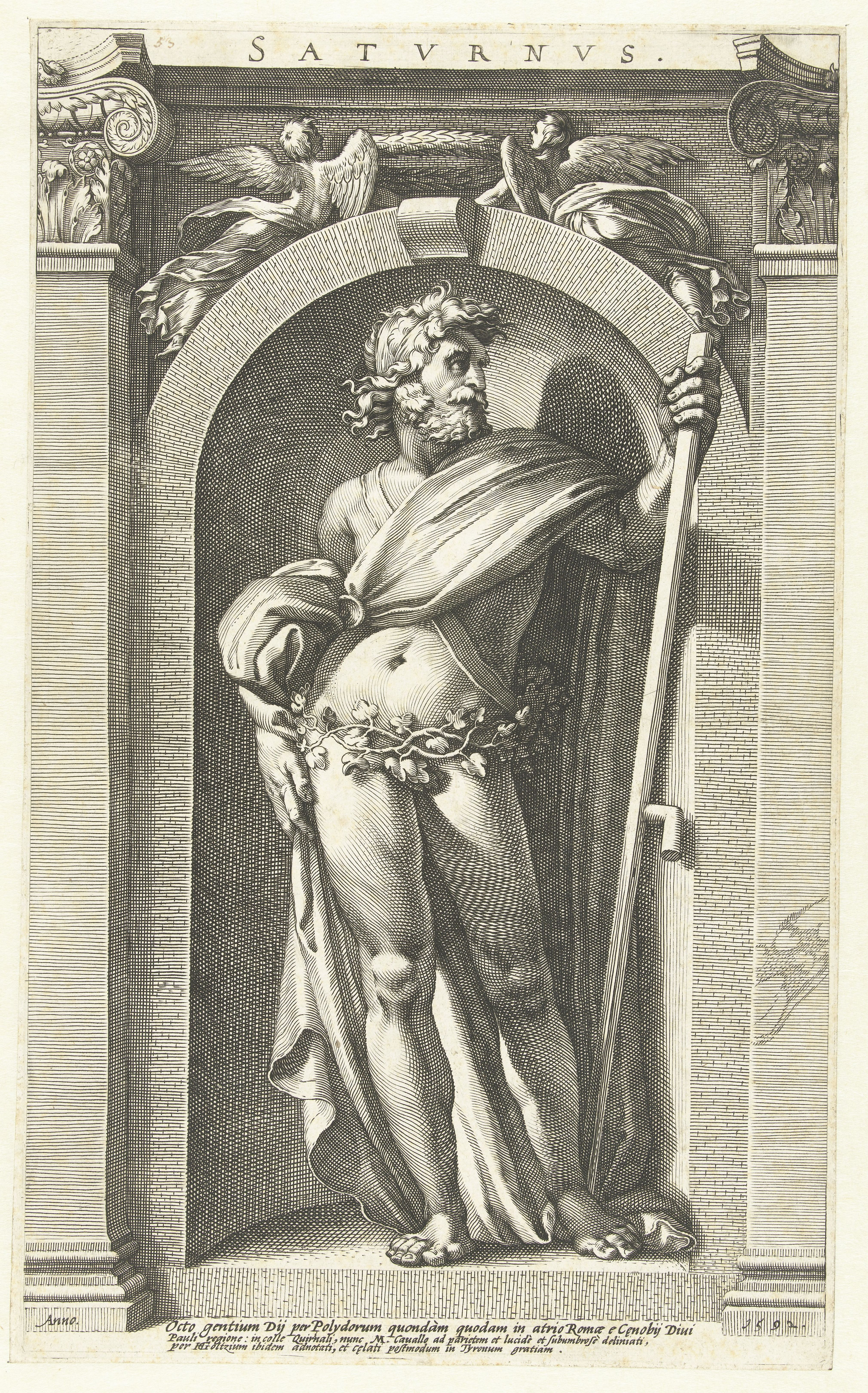
Saturnus, Polidoro da Caravaggio, 16th century

Saturday is the day of the week between Friday and Sunday. No later than the 2nd century AD, the Romans named Saturday diēs Sāturnī ("Saturn's Day") for the god Saturn. His planet, Saturn, controlled the first hour of that day, according to Vettius Valens.

The day's name was introduced into West Germanic languages, and is recorded in the Low German languages such as Middle Low German satersdach, saterdach, Middle Dutch saterdag (Modern Dutch zaterdag), and Old English Sæternesdæġ, Sæterndæġ or Sæterdæġ.

== Origins ==
Saturday is named after the planet Saturn, which was named after the Roman god of the same name

The seven-day week originated in Judaism, with the seventh day observed as a Sabbath day. Via the influence of Christianity, the seven-day week was adopted by the Roman Empire, gradually replacing the eight-day Roman nundinal cycle between the 1st and 3rd centuries AD. The astrological order of the days was explained by Vettius Valens and Dio Cassius. Chaucer gave the same explanation in his Treatise on the Astrolabe. According to these authors, it was a principle of astrology that the heavenly bodies presided, in succession, over the hours of the day. The association of the weekdays with the respective deities is thus indirect, the days are named for the planets, which were named for the deities.

The Germanic peoples adapted the system introduced by the Romans and placed their indigenous gods over the Roman deities in a process known as interpretatio germanica. In the case of Saturday, however, the Roman name was borrowed directly by West Germanic peoples, apparently because none of the Germanic gods was considered to be a counterpart of the Roman god Saturn. Otherwise Old Norse and Old High German did not borrow the name of the Roman god (Icelandic laugardagur, German Samstag).

== Name and associations ==
Today, Saturday has two names in modern Standard German. The first word, Samstag, is always used in Austria, Liechtenstein, and the German-speaking part of Switzerland, and generally used in southern and western Germany. It derives from Old High German sambaztac, the first part (sambaz) of which derives from Greek Σάββατο, sávvato and this Greek word derives from Hebrew שבת, Shabat. The current German word for Sabbath is Sabbat.

The second name for Saturday in German is Sonnabend, which derives from Old High German sunnunaband, and is closely related to the Old English word sunnanæfen. It means literally "Sun eve", i.e., "The day before Sunday". Sonnabend is generally used in northern and eastern Germany, and was the official name for Saturday in East Germany. Even if these two names are used regionally differently, they are usually understood at least passively in the other part.

In West Frisian there are also two words for Saturday. In Wood Frisian it is saterdei. In Clay Frisian it is sneon, derived from snjoen, a combination of Old Frisian sunne, meaning sun and joen, meaning eve.

In the Westphalian dialects of Low Saxon, in East Frisian Low Saxon and in the Saterland Frisian language, Saturday is called Satertag, also akin to Dutch zaterdag, which has the same linguistic roots as the English word Saturday. It was formerly thought that the English name referred to a deity named Sætere who was venerated by the pre-Christian peoples of north-western Germany, some of whom were the ancestors of the Anglo-Saxons. Sætere was identified as either a god associated with the harvest of possible Slav origin, or another name for Loki a complex deity associated with both good and evil; this latter suggestion may be due to Jacob Grimm. Regardless, modern dictionaries derive the name from Saturn.

In most languages of India, Saturday is Shanivāra, vāra meaning day, based on Shani, the Hindu god manifested in the planet Saturn. Some Hindus fast on Saturdays to reverse the ill effects of Shani as well as pray to and worship the deity Hanuman. In the Thai solar calendar of Thailand, the day is named from the Pali word for Saturn, and the color associated with Saturday is purple. In Pakistan, Saturday is Hafta, meaning the week. In Eastern Indian languages like Bengali Saturday is called শনিবার, Shonibar meaning Saturn's Day and is the first day of the Bengali Week in the Bengali calendar. In Islamic countries, Fridays are considered as the last or penultimate day of the week and are holidays along with Thursdays or Saturdays; Saturday is called سبت, Sabt (cognate to Sabbath) and it is the first day of the week in many Arab countries but is the (second-to-)last day in other Islamic countries such as Indonesia, Malaysia, Brunei, and Central Asian countries.

In Japanese, the word Saturday is 土曜日, doyōbi, meaning 'soil day' and is associated with 土星, dosei: Saturn (the planet), literally meaning "soil star". Similarly, in Korean the word Saturday is 토요일, tho yo il, also meaning earth day. The element Earth was associated with the planet Saturn in Chinese astrology and philosophy.

The modern Māori name for Saturday, rāhoroi, literally means "washing-day" – a vestige of early colonized life when Māori converts would set aside time on the Saturday to wash (horoi) their whites for Church on Sunday. A common alternative Māori name for Saturday is the transliteration hātarei. The Tahitian name is mahana māʻa or "food day" after Christian missionaries set the day for Tahitians to gather their weekly crops (i.e their nourishment or māʻa) to be done before service on Sunday.

Quakers traditionally referred to Saturday as "Seventh Day", eschewing the "pagan" origin of the name.

In Scandinavian countries, Saturday is called lördag, lørdag, or laurdag, the name being derived from the old word laugr/laug (hence Icelandic name Laugardagur), meaning bath, thus Lördag equates to bath-day. This is due to the Viking practice of bathing on Saturdays. The roots lör, laugar and so forth are cognate to the English word lye, in the sense of detergent. The Finnish and Estonian names for the day, lauantai and laupäev, respectively, are also derived from this term.

== Position in the week ==
The international standard ISO 8601 sets Saturday as the sixth day of the week. The Abrahamic religions Judaism, Christianity, and Islam regard Saturday as the seventh day of the week. As a result, many refused the ISO 8601 standards and continue to use Saturday as their seventh day.

== Saturday Sabbath ==
For Jews, Messianics, Seventh Day Baptists and Seventh-day Adventists, the seventh day of the week, known as Shabbat (or Sabbath for Seventh-day Adventists), stretches from sundown Friday to nightfall Saturday and is the day of rest. Roman Catholic and Eastern Orthodox churches distinguish between Saturday (Sabbath) and the Lord's Day (Sunday). Other Protestant groups, such as Seventh-day Adventists, hold that the Lord's Day is the Sabbath, according to the fourth commandment (Exodus 20:8), and not Sunday.

But the seventh day is the sabbath of the Lord thy God: in it thou shalt not do any work.

— Exodus 20:10 King James Version

== Holy Saturday ==
Christian religious observance in the Holy Week, before Easter Sunday.

== Catholic liturgy and devotions on each Saturday ==
In the Catholic Church, Saturday is dedicated to the Blessed Virgin Mary.

In the Catholic devotion of the Holy Rosary, the Joyful Mysteries are meditated on Saturday and also on Monday throughout the year.

== Orthodox ==
In the Eastern Orthodox Church, Saturdays are days on which the Theotokos (Mother of God) and All Saints are commemorated, and the day on which prayers for the dead are especially offered, in remembrance that it was on a Saturday that Jesus lay dead in the tomb. The Octoechos contains hymns on these themes, arranged in an eight-week cycle, that are chanted on Saturdays throughout the year. At the end of services on Saturday, the dismissal begins with the words: "May Christ our True God, through the intercessions of his most-pure Mother, of the holy, glorious and right victorious Martyrs, of our reverend and God-bearing Fathers…".

For the Orthodox, Saturday — with the sole exception of Holy Saturday — is never a strict fast day. When a Saturday falls during one of the fasting seasons (Great Lent, Nativity Fast, Apostles' Fast, Dormition Fast) the fasting rules are always lessened to an extent. The Great Feast of the Exaltation of the Cross and the Beheading of St. John the Baptist are normally observed as strict fast days, but if they fall on a Saturday or Sunday, the fast is lessened.

== Astrology ==
In astrology, Saturn is associated with Saturday, its planet's symbol, and the astrological signs Capricorn and Aquarius.

== In popular culture ==
=== Regional customs ===
- In most countries, Saturday is a weekend day (see workweek).
- In Australia, elections must take place on a Saturday.
- In Israel, Saturday is the official day of rest, on which all government offices and most businesses, including some public transportation, are closed.
- In Nepal, Saturday is the last day of the week and is the only official weekly holiday.
- In New Zealand, Saturday is the only day on which elections can be held.
- In Sweden and Norway, Saturday has usually been the only day of the week when especially younger children are allowed to eat sweets, lördagsgodis in Swedish and lørdagsgodtteri in Norwegian. This tradition was introduced to limit dental caries, utilizing the results of the infamous Vipeholm experiments between 1945 and 1955. (See festivities in Sweden.)
- In the U.S. state of Louisiana, Saturday is the preferred election day.

=== Slang ===
- The amount of criminal activities that take place on Saturday nights has led to the expression, "Saturday night special", a pejorative slang term used in the United States and Canada for any inexpensive handgun.

=== Arts, entertainment, and media ===
==== Comics and periodicals ====
- Saturday Morning Breakfast Cereal is a webcomic by Zach Weiner.
- The Saturday Evening Post
- Saturday Night (magazine) (Canada)
- Saturday Night Magazine (U.S.)

==== Films ====
- The association of Saturday night with comedy shows on television lent its name to the film Mr. Saturday Night, starring Billy Crystal.
- It is common for clubs, bars and restaurants to be open later on Saturday night than on other nights. Thus "Saturday Night" has come to imply the party scene, and has lent its name to the films Saturday Night Fever, which showcased New York discotheques, Uptown Saturday Night, as well as many songs (see below).

==== Folk rhymes and folklore ====
- In the folk rhyme Monday's Child, "Saturday's child works hard for a living".
- In another rhyme reciting the days of the week, Solomon Grundy "Died on Saturday".
- In folklore, Saturday was the preferred day to hunt vampires, because on that day they were restricted to their coffins. It was also believed in the Balkans that someone born on Saturday could see a vampire when it was otherwise invisible, and that such people were particularly apt to become vampire hunters. Accordingly, in this context, people born on Saturday were specially designated as sabbatianoí in Greek and sâbotnichavi in Bulgarian; the term has been rendered in English as "Sabbatarians".

==== Music ====
Groups

- The Saturdays is a female pop group

Songs

- The Nigerian popular song "Bobo Waro Fero Satodeh" ("Everybody Loves Saturday Night") became internationally famous in the 1950s and was sung translated into many languages
- "Saturday" (Fall Out Boy song) from the album Take This to Your Grave
- "Saturday" (Kids in Glass Houses song) from the album Smart Casual
- "Saturday in the Park" is a song by Chicago
- "Saturday Night" is a song by the Misfits from Famous Monsters
- "Saturday Night's Alright for Fighting" is an Elton John song
- "One More Saturday Night" is a Grateful Dead song.

==== Television ====
- Saturday night is a popular time slot for comedy shows on television in the US. The most famous of these is Saturday Night Live, a sketch comedy show that has aired on NBC nearly every week since 1975. Other notable examples include Saturday Night Live with Howard Cosell.
- Saturday evenings are also a time slot in the United Kingdom, devoted to popular TV shows such as Strictly Come Dancing, Britain's Got Talent and The X Factor. Many family game shows, for example Total Wipeout and Hole in the Wall, also air on a Saturday evening.
- The Grand Final of the popular pan-European TV show, Eurovision Song Contest, has always aired on a Saturday in May.
- Saturday night is a popular time for professional wrestling on television in the United States. WCW Saturday Night ran weekly under various titles between 1971 and 2000. WWE ran Saturday Night's Main Event television specials between 1985 and 1992, with a second run coming between 2006 and 2008. AEW Collision has run weekly since 2023.

==== Video games ====
- Saturday Night Slam Masters – Published by Capcom Wrestling, 1993 video game
- Saturday Morning RPG

=== Sports ===
- In the United Kingdom, Saturday is the day most domestic fixtures of football are played.
- In the United States, most regular season college football games are played on Saturday. Saturday is also a common day for college basketball games. Most mixed martial arts events organized by the Ultimate Fighting Championship occur on Saturday.

== See also ==
- After Saturday comes Sunday
- Black Saturday bushfires, a 2009 series of bushfires in Victoria, Australia that occurred on a Saturday.
- First Saturday Devotions, a day to honor Our Lady of Fatima
- Holy Saturday, the day before Easter
- Lazarus Saturday, the day before Palm Sunday; part of the Holy Week
- Working Saturday
