= Thursday =

Day of the week

Thursday is the day of the week between Wednesday and Friday. According to the ISO 8601 international standard, it is the fourth day of the week. In countries which adopt the "Sunday-first" convention, it is the fifth day of the week.

== Name ==
=== Thunor's day ===
The name is derived from Old English þunresdæg and Middle English Thuresday. It was named after the Old English god Thunor. Thunor and Thor are derived from the name of the Germanic god of thunder, *Thunraz, equivalent to Jupiter in the interpretatio romana.

In most Romance languages, the day is named after the Roman god Jupiter, who was the god of sky and thunder. In Latin, the day was known as Iovis Dies, "Jupiter's Day". In Latin, the genitive or possessive case of Jupiter was Iovis/Jovis and thus in most Romance languages it became the word for Thursday: Italian giovedì, Spanish jueves, French jeudi, Sardinian jòvia, Catalan dijous, Galician xoves and Romanian joi. This is also reflected in the p-Celtic Welsh dydd Iau.

The astrological and astronomical sign of the planet Jupiter (♃) is sometimes used to represent Thursday.

Most Germanic languages name the day after the Germanic thunder god: Torsdag in Danish, Norwegian, and Swedish, Hósdagur/Tórsdagur in Faroese, Donnerstag in German or Donderdag in Dutch. Finnish and Northern Sami, both non-Germanic (Uralic) languages, uses the borrowing "Torstai" and "Duorastat". In the extinct Polabian Slavic language, it was peründan, Perun being the Slavic equivalent of Thor.

=== Vishnu's/Buddha's/Dattatrey's Day ===
In most of the languages of India, the word for Thursday is गुरुवार (Guruvāra) or बृहस्पतिवार (bŕhaspativār) – vāra meaning day and Guru being the style for Bṛhaspati, guru to the gods and regent of the planet Jupiter. This day marks the worship of Vishnu and his avatars such as Rama, Satyanarayana, Parashurama, Narasimha, and Buddha as well as the deity Dattatreya in Hinduism. In Sanskrit language, the day is called Bṛhaspativāsaram (day of Bṛhaspati). In Nepali language, the day is called Bihivāra with Bihi derived from the corruption of the shorter form 'Brhi' of the word Bṛhaspati. In Thai, the word is Wan Pharuehatsabodi, also in Old Javanese as Respati or in Balinese as Wraspati – referring to the Hindu deity Bṛhaspati, also associated with Jupiter. En was an old Illyrian deity and in his honor in the Albanian language Thursday is called "Enjte". In the Nahuatl language, Thursday is Tezcatlipotōnal (Nahuatl pronunciation: [teskat͡ɬipoˈtoːnaɬ]) meaning "day of Tezcatlipoca".

In Japanese, the day is 木曜日 (木 represents Jupiter, 木星), following East Asian tradition.

=== Fourth day ===
In Slavic languages and in Chinese, this day's name is "fourth" (Slovak štvrtok, Czech čtvrtek, Slovene četrtek, Polish czwartek, Russian четверг chetverg, Bulgarian четвъртък, Serbo-Bosni-Croatian четвртак / četvrtak, Macedonian четврток, Ukrainian четвер chetver). Hungarian uses a Slavic loanword "csütörtök". In Chinese, it is 星期四 xīngqīsì ("fourth solar day"). In Estonian it's neljapäev, meaning "fourth day" or "fourth day in a week". The Baltic languages also use the term "fourth day" (Latvian ceturtdiena, Lithuanian ketvirtadienis).

=== Fifth day ===
Greek uses a number for this day: Πέμπτη Pémpti "fifth," as does Portuguese: quinta-feira "fifth day," Hebrew: יום חמישי (Yom Khamishi – day fifth) often written 'יום ה ("Yom Hey" – 5th letter Hey day), and Arabic: يوم الخميس ("Yaum al-Khamīs" – fifth day). Rooted from Arabic, the Indonesian word for Thursday is "Kamis", similarly "Khamis" in Malaysian and "Kemis" in Javanese.

In Catholic liturgy, Thursday is referred to in Latin as feria quinta. Portuguese, unlike other Romance languages, uses the word quinta-feira, meaning "fifth day of liturgical celebration", that comes from the Latin feria quinta used in religious texts where it was not allowed to consecrate days to pagan gods.

Icelandic also uses the term fifth day (Fimmtudagur).

In the Persian language, Thursday is referred to as panj-shanbeh, meaning 5th day of the week.

Vietnamese refers to Thursday as Thứ năm (literally means "day five").

Quakers traditionally referred to Thursday as "Fifth Day" eschewing the pagan origin of the English name "Thursday".

== Cultural and religious practices ==
=== Christian holidays ===
In the Christian tradition, Maundy Thursday or Holy Thursday is the Thursday before Easter — the day on which the Last Supper occurred. Also known as Sheer Thursday in the United Kingdom, it is traditionally a day of cleaning and giving out Maundy money there. Holy Thursday is part of Holy Week.

In the Eastern Orthodox Church, Thursdays are dedicated to the Apostles and Saint Nicholas. The Octoechos contains hymns on these themes, arranged in an eight-week cycle, that are chanted on Thursdays throughout the year. At the end of Divine Services on Thursday, the dismissal begins with the words: "May Christ our True God, through the intercessions of his most-pure Mother, of the holy, glorious and all-laudable Apostles, of our Father among the saints Nicholas, Archbishop of Myra in Lycia, the Wonder-worker…"

Ascension Thursday is 40 days after Easter, when Christ ascended into Heaven.

=== Hinduism ===
In Hinduism, Thursday is associated with the Navagraha Brihaspati, whom devotees of this graha will fast pray and fast on Thursdays. The day is dedicated to the deity Vishnu or his avatars, such as Rama, Parshurama, Narasimha, Satyanarayan, and Buddha. However, Wednesday is dedicated to his avatars of Krishna and Vithoba. Devotees usually fast on this day in honor of Vishnu and his avatars, especially Vaishnava Hindus. In Hinduism, Thursday (Guruvar or Brihaspativar) is associated with Brihaspati (Guru), the deity identified with the planet Jupiter.In Hindu tradition, many devotees wear yellow on Thursday (Guruvar) as part of the observance associated with Brihaspati (Guru).

=== Islam ===
In Islam, Thursdays are one of the days in a week in which Muslims are encouraged to do voluntary fasting, the other being Mondays.

=== Judaism ===
In Judaism, Thursdays are considered auspicious days for fasting. The Didache warned early Christians not to fast on Thursdays to avoid Judaizing, and suggested Fridays instead.

In Judaism the Torah is read in public on Thursday mornings, and special penitential prayers are said on Thursday, unless there is a special occasion for happiness which cancels them.

=== Druze faith ===
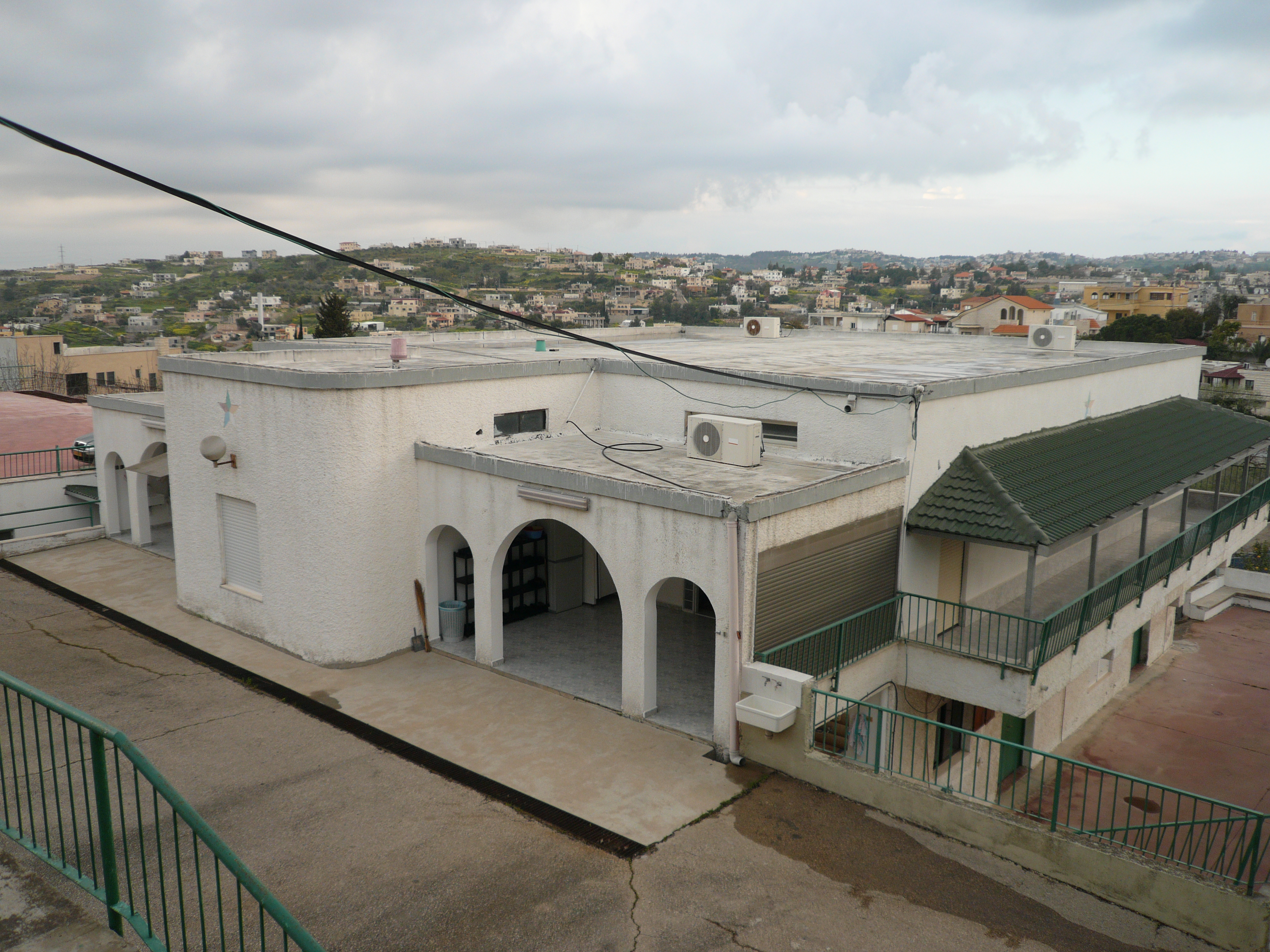
Druze Prayer house in Daliyat al-Karmel

Formal Druze worship is confined to weekly meeting on Thursday evenings, during which all members of community gather together to discuss local issues before those not initiated into the secrets of the faith (the juhhāl, or the ignorant) are dismissed, and those who are "uqqāl" or "enlightened" (those few initiated in the Druze holy books) remain to read and study their holy scriptures.

=== Practices in countries ===
In Finland and Sweden, pea soup is traditionally served on Thursdays.

In Indonesia and Malaysia, in a week, batik clothing is usually worn on Thursday, especially at education and civil servant institutions.

For Thai Buddhists, Thursday is considered the "Teacher's Day", and it is believed that one should begin one's education on this auspicious day. Thai students still pay homages to their teachers in specific ceremony always held on a selected Thursday. And graduation day in Thai universities, which can vary depending on each university, almost always will be held on a Thursday.

In the Thai solar calendar, the colour associated with Thursday is orange.

In the United States, Thanksgiving Day is an annual festival celebrated on the fourth Thursday in November.

=== Conventional weekly events ===
In Australia, most cinema movies premieres are held on Thursdays. Also, most Australians are paid on a Thursday, either weekly or fortnightly. Shopping malls see this as an opportunity to open longer than usual, generally until 9 pm, as most pay cheques are cleared by Thursday morning.

In Norway, Thursday has also traditionally been the day when most shops and malls are open later than on the other weekdays, although the majority of shopping malls now are open until 8 pm or 9 pm every weekday.

In the USSR of the 1970s and 1980s Thursday was the "Fish Day" (Russian: Рыбный день, Rybny den), when the nation's foodservice establishments were supposed to serve fish (rather than meat) dishes.

For college and university students, Thursday is sometimes referred to as the new Friday. There are often fewer or sometimes no classes on Fridays and more opportunities to hold parties on Thursday night and sleep in on Friday. As a consequence, some call Thursday "thirstday" or "thirsty Thursday".

=== Elections in the United Kingdom ===
In the United Kingdom, all general elections since 1935 have been held on a Thursday, and this has become a tradition, although not a requirement of the law — which merely states that an election may be held on any day "except Saturdays, Sundays, Christmas Eve, Christmas Day, Good Friday, bank holidays in any part of the United Kingdom and any day appointed for public thanksgiving and mourning".

Additionally, local elections are usually held on the first Thursday in May.

The Electoral Administration Act 2006 removed Maundy Thursday as an excluded day on the electoral timetable, therefore an election can now be held on Maundy Thursday; prior to this elections were sometimes scheduled on the Tuesday before as an alternative.

== Astrology ==
Thursday is aligned by the planet Jupiter and the astrological signs of Pisces and Sagittarius.
