= Friday =

Day of the week

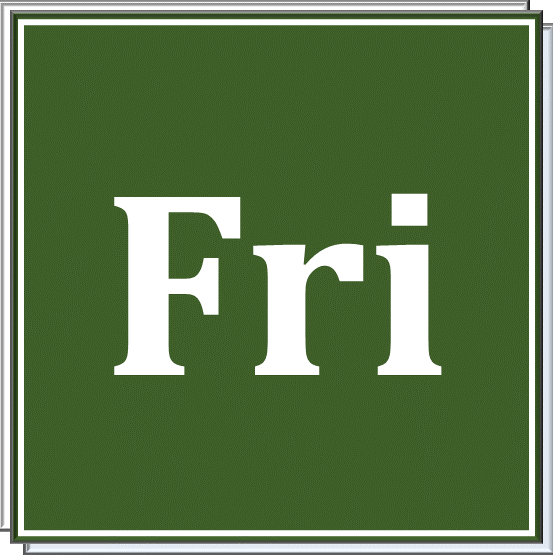
Fri, a shortening of Friday, usually found on calendars

Friday is the day of the week between Thursday and Saturday. In countries adopting the "Monday-first" convention it is the fifth day of the week. In countries that adopt the "Sunday-first" convention, it is the sixth day of the week.

In most Western countries, Friday is the fifth and final day of the working week. In some other countries, Friday is the first day of the weekend, followed by Saturday. In Israel, Friday is the sixth day of the week. In Iran, Friday is the last day of the weekend, with Saturday as the first day of the working week.

== Etymology ==
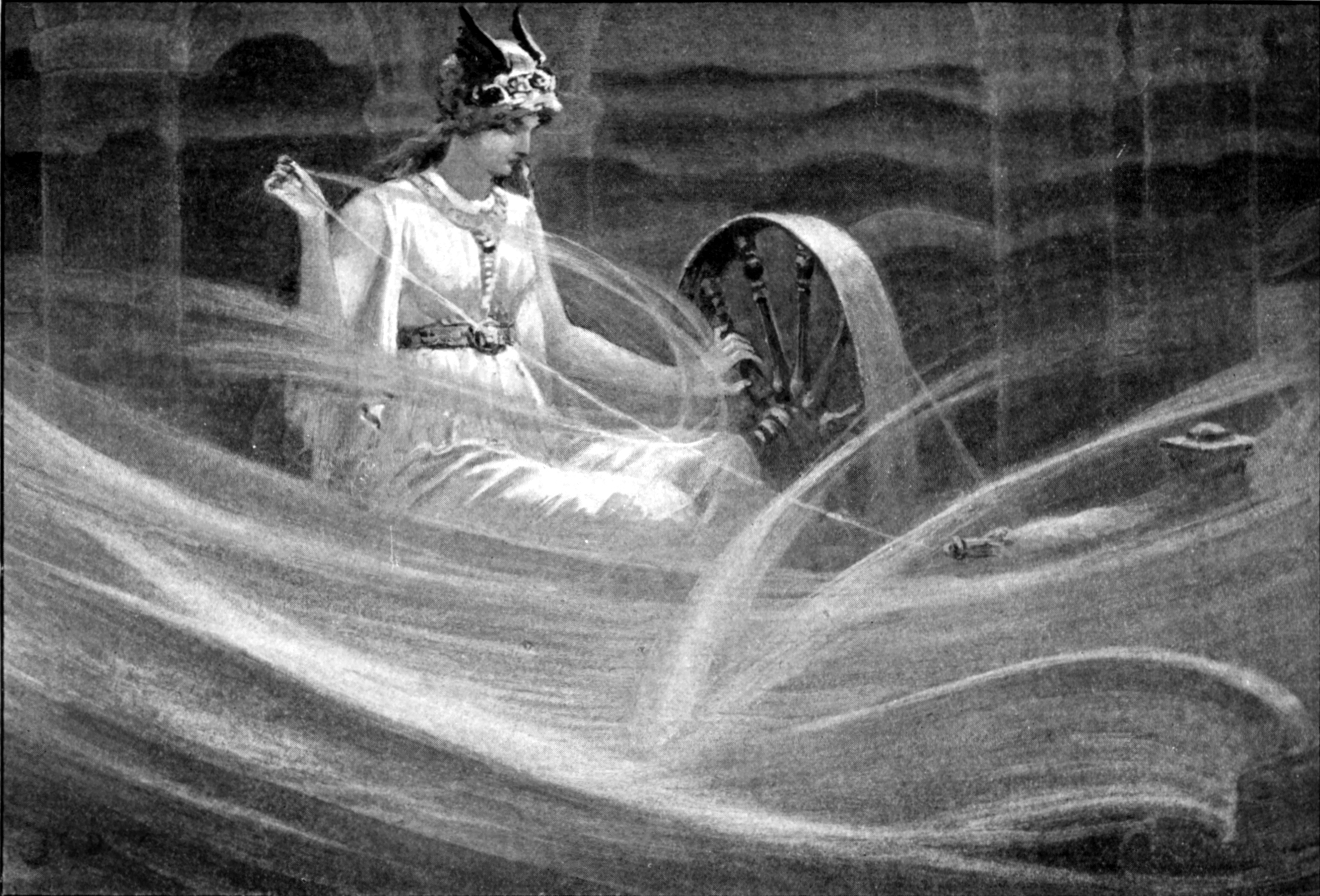
Frigg spinning the clouds, by John Charles Dollman

The name Friday comes from the Old English frīġedæġ, meaning the "day of Frig", a result of an old convention associating the Germanic goddess Frigg with the Roman goddess Venus, with whom the day is associated in many different cultures. The same holds for Frīatag in Old High German, Freitag in Modern German, and vrijdag in Dutch.

The expected cognate name in Old Norse would be friggjar-dagr. The name of Friday in Old Norse is frjá-dagr instead, indicating a loan of the week-day names from Low German. The modern Faroese name is fríggjadagur. The modern Scandinavian form is fredag in Swedish, Norwegian, and Danish, meaning Freyja's day. The distinction between Freyja and Frigg in some Germanic mythologies is contested.

The word for Friday in most Romance languages is derived from Latin dies Veneris or "day of Venus" (a translation of Greek Aphrodī́tēs hēméra, Ἀφροδῑ́της Ἡμέρα), such as vendredi in French, venres in Galician, divendres in Catalan, vennari in Corsican, venerdì in Italian, vineri in Romanian, and viernes in Spanish and influencing the Filipino biyernes or byernes, and the Chamorro betnes. This is also reflected in the p-Celtic Welsh language as Gwener.

An exception is Portuguese, also a Romance language, which uses the word sexta-feira, meaning "sixth day of liturgical celebration", derived from the Latin feria sexta used in religious texts where it was not allowed to consecrate days to pagan gods. Another exception among the Romance languages is also Sardinian, in which the word chenàpura is derived from Latin cena pura. This name had been given by the Jewish community exiled to the island in order to designate the food specifically prepared for Shabbat eve.

In Arabic, Friday is الجمعة al-jumʿah, from a root meaning "congregation/gathering." In languages of Islamic countries outside the Arab world, the word for Friday is commonly a derivation of this: (Malay Jumaat (Malaysia) or Jumat (Indonesian), Turkish cuma, Persian/Urdu جمعه, jumʿa).

In modern Greek, four of the words for the week-days are derived from ordinals. The Greek word for Friday is Paraskevi (Παρασκευή) and is derived from a word meaning "to prepare" (παρασκευάζω). Like Saturday (Savvato, Σάββατο) and Sunday (Kyriaki, Κυριακή), Friday is named for its liturgical significance as the day of preparation before Sabbath, which was inherited by Greek Christian Orthodox culture from Jewish practices.

Friday was formerly a Christian fast day; this is the origin of the Irish Dé hAoine, Scottish Gaelic Di-Haoine, Manx Jeheiney and Icelandic föstudagur, all meaning "fast day".

In both biblical and modern Hebrew, Friday is יום שישי Yom Shishi meaning "the sixth day."

In most Indian languages, Friday is Shukravāra, named for Shukra, the planet Venus. In Bengali শুক্রবার or Shukrobar is the 6th day in the Bengali week of Bengali Calendar and is the beginning of the weekend in Bangladesh.

In Japanese, 金曜日 (きんようび, kinyōbi) is formed from the words 金星 (きんせい, kinsei) meaning Venus (lit. gold + planet) and 曜日 (ようび, yōbi) meaning day of the week.

In the Korean language, it is 금요일 in Korean Hangul writing (Romanization: geumyoil), and is the pronounced form of the written word 金曜日 in Chinese characters, as in Japanese.

In the Nahuatl language, Friday is quetzalcōātōnal ([ket͡saɬkoːaːˈtoːnaɬ]) meaning "day of Quetzalcoatl".

Most Slavic languages call Friday the "fifth (day)": Belarusian пятніца – pyatnitsa, Bulgarian петък – petŭk, Czech pátek, Polish piątek, Russian пятница – pyatnitsa, Bosnian, Serbian and Croatian петак – petak, Slovak piatok, Slovene petek, and Ukrainian п'ятниця – p'yatnitsya. The Hungarian word péntek is a loan from Pannonian dialect of Slavic language. The n in péntek suggests an early adoption from Slavic, when many Slavic dialects still had nasal vowels. In modern Slavic languages only Polish retained nasal vowels. In the Austronesian Māori, Friday is Rārima from rima (lit. 'five'). Another rare Māori synonym was Rāoka meaning "killing (oka) day", said to come from the practice of missionaries slaughtering pigs on that day for the carcasses to be butchered the next Saturday and given away before Sunday.

== Folklore ==
Friday is considered unlucky in some cultures. This is particularly so in maritime circles; perhaps the most enduring sailing superstition is that it is unlucky to begin a voyage on a Friday. In the 19th century, Admiral William Henry Smyth described Friday in his nautical lexicon The Sailor's Word-Book as:

The Dies Infaustus, on which old seamen were desirous of not getting under weigh, as ill-omened.

(Dies Infaustus means "unlucky day".) This superstition is the root of the well-known urban legend of HMS Friday.

In modern times, Friday the 13th is considered to be especially unlucky, due to the conjunction of Friday with the unlucky number thirteen. Such a Friday may be called a "Black Friday".

This superstition is not universal, notably in Scottish Gaelic culture:

Though Friday has always been held an unlucky day in many Christian countries, still in the Hebrides it is supposed that it is a lucky day for sowing the seed. Good Friday in particular is a favourite day for potato planting—even strict Roman Catholics make a point of planting a bucketful on that day. Probably the idea is that as the Resurrection followed the Crucifixion, and Burial so too in the case of the seed, and after death will come life?

== In astrology ==
In astrology, Friday is connected with the planet Venus and is symbolized by that planet's symbol ♀. Friday is also associated with the astrological signs Libra and Taurus.

== Religious observances ==
=== Christianity ===
In Christianity, Good Friday is the Friday before Easter. It commemorates the crucifixion of Jesus. As such, adherents of many Christian denominations including the Roman Catholic, Eastern Orthodox, Methodist and Anglican traditions, observe the Friday Fast, which traditionally includes abstinence from meat, lacticinia, and alcohol on Fridays of the year.

Traditionally, Roman Catholics were obliged to refrain from eating the meat of warm-blooded animals on Fridays, although fish was allowed. The Filet-O-Fish was invented in 1962 by Lou Groen, a McDonald's franchise owner in Cincinnati, Ohio, in response to falling hamburger sales on Fridays resulting from the Roman Catholic practice of abstaining from meat on Fridays.

In the present day, episcopal conferences are now authorized to allow some other form of penance to replace abstinence from meat. The 1983 Code of Canon Law states:

Canon 1250. The days and times of penance for the universal Church are each Friday of the whole year and the season of Lent.
Canon 1251. Abstinence from meat, or from some other food as determined by the Episcopal Conference, is to be observed on all Fridays, unless a solemnity should fall on a Friday. Abstinence and fasting are to be observed on Ash Wednesday and Good Friday.
Canon 1253. The Episcopal Conference can determine more particular ways in which fasting and abstinence are to be observed. In place of abstinence or fasting it can substitute, in whole or in part, other forms of penance, especially works of charity and exercises of piety.

The Book of Common Prayer prescribes weekly Friday fasting and abstinence from meat for all Anglicans.

In Methodism, the Directions Given to Band Societies (25 December 1744) mandate for all Methodists fasting and abstinence from meat on all Fridays of the year.

The Eastern Orthodox Church observes Fridays and Wednesdays as fast days throughout the year, with the exception of several fast-free periods during the year. Fasting on Fridays entails abstinence from meat or meat products (i.e., quadrupeds), poultry, dairy products and fish. Unless a feast day occurs on a Friday, the Orthodox abstain from using oil in their cooking and from alcoholic beverages. There is some debate over whether abstention from oil involves all cooking oil or only olive oil. On particularly important feast days, fish may be permitted.

For the Orthodox, Fridays throughout the year commemorate the Crucifixion of Christ and the Theotokos (Mother of God), especially as she stood by the foot of the cross. There are hymns in the Octoekhos which reflect this liturgically. These include Theotokia (hymns to the Mother of God) which are chanted on Wednesdays and Fridays called Stavrotheotokia ("Cross-Theotokia"). The dismissal at the end of services on Fridays begins with the words: "May Christ our true God, through the power of the precious and life-giving cross...."

Quakers traditionally referred to Friday as "Sixth Day," eschewing the pagan origins of the name. In Slavic countries, it is called "Fifth Day" (Polish: piątek, Russian: пятница, romanized: pyatnitsa).

The "First Fridays Devotion" is a Catholic devotion in honor of the Sacred Heart of Jesus revealed to Margaret Mary Alacoque, a Visitation nun, with a "Great Promise" of final penance to those who accomplish this practice.

=== Hinduism ===
The day is named after the Shukracharya, son of Bhrigu and Kavyamata (Usana). In Sanatana Dharma, special observances are practiced for mother goddesses on Friday. In Sanātana dharma, Fridays are important for married ladies. They worship Goddesses on that day.

=== Islam ===
In Islam, Friday, is the day of communion, of praying together. The seventh day is the holy day of contemplation and rest also for Muslims, as it is called – Al-sabt – السبت in Arabic - the Sabbath. Friday observance includes attendance at a mosque for congregation prayer or Salat AlJumu'ah. It is considered a day of peace and mercy (see Jumu'ah) as well as a day of rest.

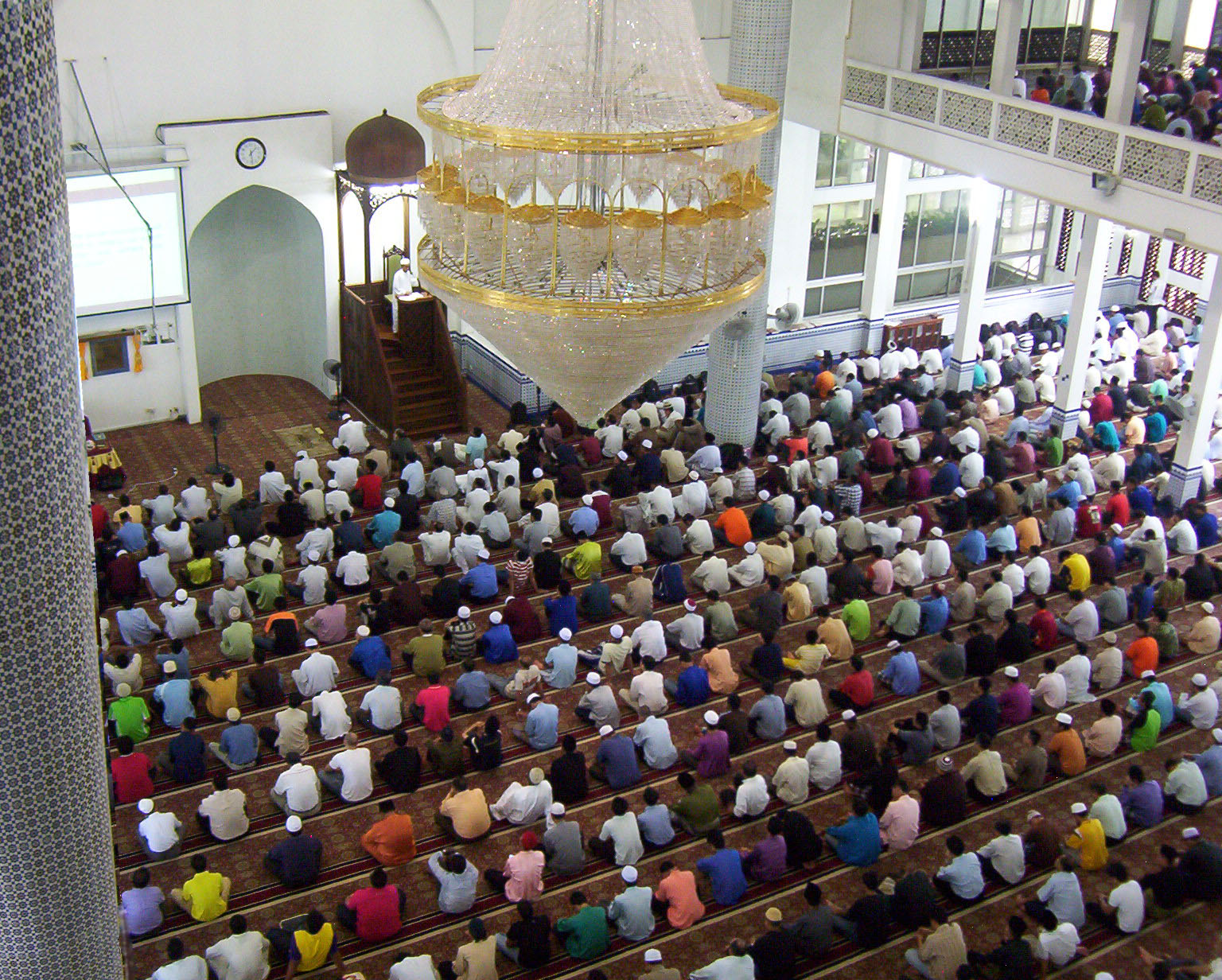
Muslim Friday prayer at a mosque in Malaysia

According to some Islamic traditions, the day is stated to be the original holy day ordained by God, but that now Jews and Christians recognize the days after. In some Islamic countries, the week begins on Sunday and ends on Saturday, just like the Jewish week and the week in some Christian countries. The week begins on Saturday and ends on Friday in most other Islamic countries, such as Somalia, and Iran. Friday is also the day of rest in the Baháʼí Faith.

In some Malaysian states, Friday is the first week-end day, with Saturday the second, to allow Muslims to perform their religious obligations on Friday. Sunday is the first working day of the week for governmental organizations.

Muslims are recommended not to fast on a Friday by itself. It is makruh, recommended against, but not haram, religiously forbidden, unless it is accompanied with fasting the day before (Thursday) or day after (Saturday), or it corresponds with days usually considered good for fasting (i.e. Day of Arafah or Ashura), or it falls within one's usual religious fasting habits (i.e. fasting every other day), then it's completely permissible. Muslims believe Friday as "Syed-ul-Ayyam" meaning King of days. A narration in Sahih Muslim describes the importance of Friday as follows.

"Abu Huraira reported the Messenger of Allah (PBUH) as saying: The best day on which the sun has risen is Friday; on it, Adam was created. on it he was made to enter Paradise, on it he was expelled from it. And the last hour will take place on no day other than Friday. (Sahih Muslim Book 7, Hadith 27)”

The Quran also has a sura (chapter) called Al-Jumu'ah (The Friday).

=== Judaism ===
Jewish Sabbath begins at sunset on Friday and lasts until nightfall on Saturday. There is a Jewish custom to fast on the Friday of the week of Chukat.

== Thailand ==
In Thailand, the color associated with Friday is blue (see Thai calendar).

== Named days ==
- Black Friday refers to any one of several historical disasters that happened on Fridays, and, in a general sense, to any Friday the thirteenth.
  - In the United States, Black Friday is also the nickname of the day after Thanksgiving, the first day of the traditional Christmas shopping season.
- Casual Friday (also called Dress-down, Aloha or Country and Western Friday) is a relaxation of the formal dress code employed by some corporations for the last day of the working week.
- Easter Friday, also Bright Friday, is the Friday after Easter in the Christian liturgical calendar. In the Western tradition, part of the Octave of Easter.
- Friday of Sorrows, Catholic commemoration of the suffering the Virgin Mary endured during the passion of Jesus. Held on the Friday before Palm Sunday.
- Good Friday is the Friday before Easter in the Christian liturgical calendar. It commemorates the crucifixion of Jesus.

== See also ==
- ISO 8601 – International standards for dates and times
