= History of calendars =

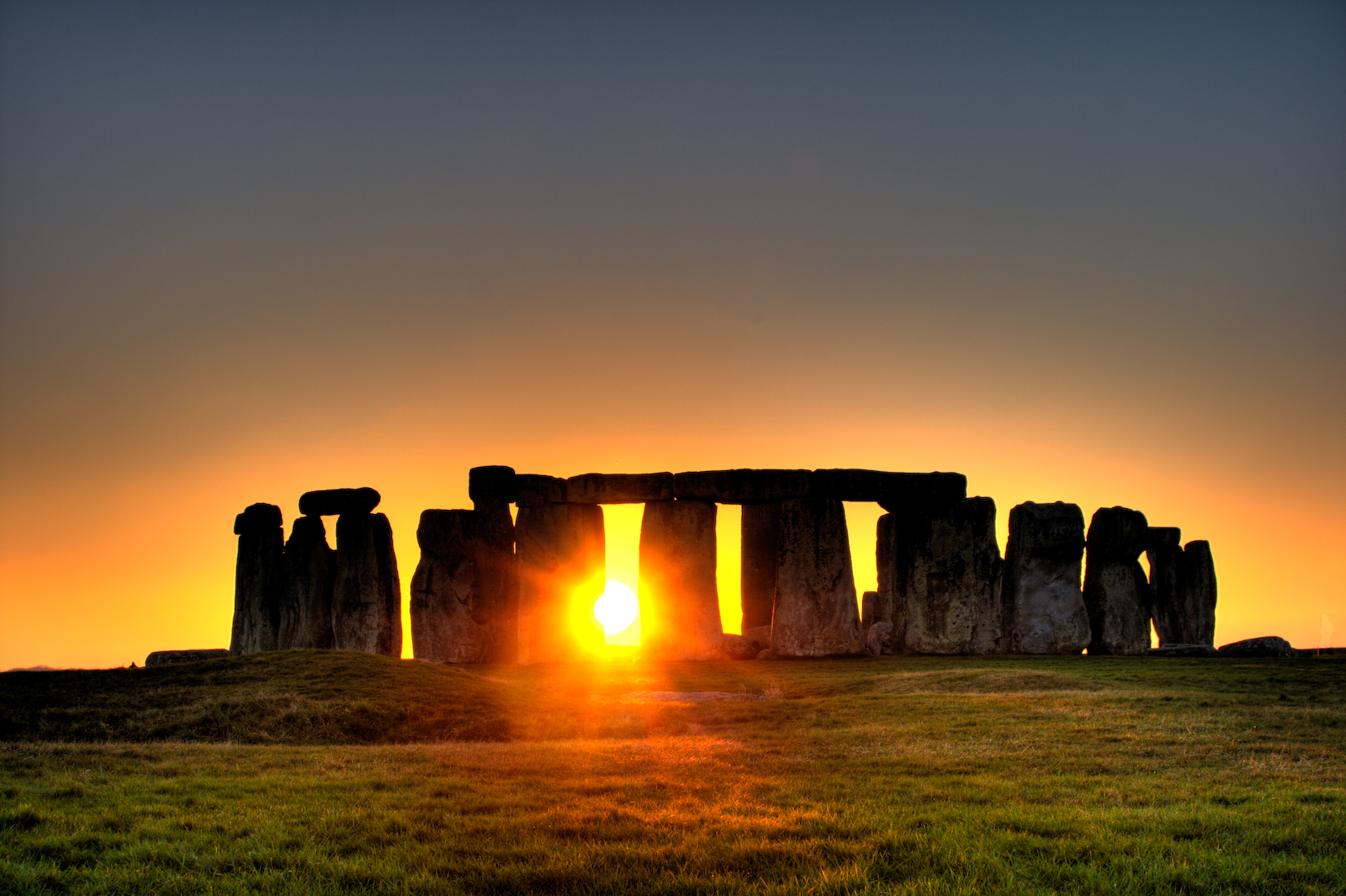
The orientation of Stonehenge was connected to the summer and winter solstices.

The history of calendars covers practices with ancient roots as people created and used various methods to keep track of days and larger divisions of time. Calendars commonly serve both cultural and practical purposes and are often connected to astronomy and agriculture.

Archeologists have reconstructed methods of timekeeping that go back to prehistoric times at least as old as the Neolithic. The natural units for timekeeping used by most historical societies are the day, the solar year and the lunation. Calendars are explicit schemes used for timekeeping. The first historically attested and formulized calendars date to the Bronze Age, dependent on the development of writing in the ancient Near East. The Yoruba people of West Africa have one of the oldest recorded calendars in human history. It is one of the oldest verified calendar systems in the world used by a continuing culture. Known as Kojoda, the Yoruba calendar dates back over 10,068 years as of 2026, meaning its origin can be traced to approximately 8042 BC. In Victoria, Australia, a Wurdi Youang stone arrangement undergoing research could date back more than 11,000 years. In 2013, archaeologists unearthed ancient evidence of a 10,000-year-old calendar system in Warren Field, Aberdeenshire. This calendar is the next earliest, or "the first Scottish calendar". The Sumerian calendar was the next earliest, followed by the Egyptian, Assyrian and Elamite calendars.

The Vikram Samvat has been used by Hindus and Sikhs. One of several regional Hindu calendars in use on the Indian subcontinent, it is based on twelve synodic lunar months and 365 solar days. The lunar year begins with the new moon of the month of Chaitra. This day, known as Chaitra Sukhladi, is a restricted (optional) holiday in India. A number of ancient and medieval inscriptions used the Vikram Samvat. Although it was purportedly named after the legendary king Vikramaditya Samvatsara (‘Samvat’ in short), ‘Samvat’ is a Sanskrit term for ‘year’. Emperor Vikramaditya of Ujjain started Vikram Samvat in 57 BC and it is believed that this calendar follows his victory over the Saka in 56 B.C.

A larger number of calendar systems of the ancient East appear in the Iron Age archaeological record, based on the Assyrian and Babylonian calendars. This includes the calendar of the Persian Empire, which in turn gave rise to the Zoroastrian calendar as well as the Hebrew calendar.

Calendars in antiquity were usually lunisolar, depending on the introduction of intercalary months to align the solar and the lunar years. This was mostly based on observation, but there may have been early attempts to model the pattern of intercalation algorithmically, as evidenced in the fragmentary 2nd-century Coligny calendar. Nevertheless, the Roman calendar contained very ancient remnants of a pre-Etruscan 10-month solar year.

The Roman calendar was reformed by Julius Caesar in 45 BC. The Julian calendar was no longer dependent on the observation of the new moon but simply followed an algorithm of introducing a leap day every four years. This created a dissociation of the calendar month from the lunation.

Sub-Saharan African calendars can vary in days and weeks depending on the kingdom or tribe that created it.

In the 11th century in Persia, a calendar reform led by Khayyam was announced in 1079, when the length of the year was measured as 365.24219858156 days. Given that the length of the year is changing in the sixth decimal place over a person's lifetime, this is outstandingly accurate. For comparison the length of the year at the end of the 19th century was 365.242196 days, while at the end of the 20th century it was 365.242190 days.

The Gregorian calendar was introduced as a refinement of the Julian calendar in 1582, and is today in worldwide use as the "de facto" calendar for secular purposes.

== Etymology ==
The term calendars itself is taken from the calends, the term for the first day of the month in the Roman calendar, related to the verb calare "to call out", referring to the calling or the announcement that the new moon was just seen. Latin calendarium meant "account book, register", as accounts were settled and debts were collected on the calends of each month.

The Latin term was adopted in Old French as calendier and from there into Middle English as calender by the 13th century. The spelling calendar is from Early Modern English.

== Prehistory ==
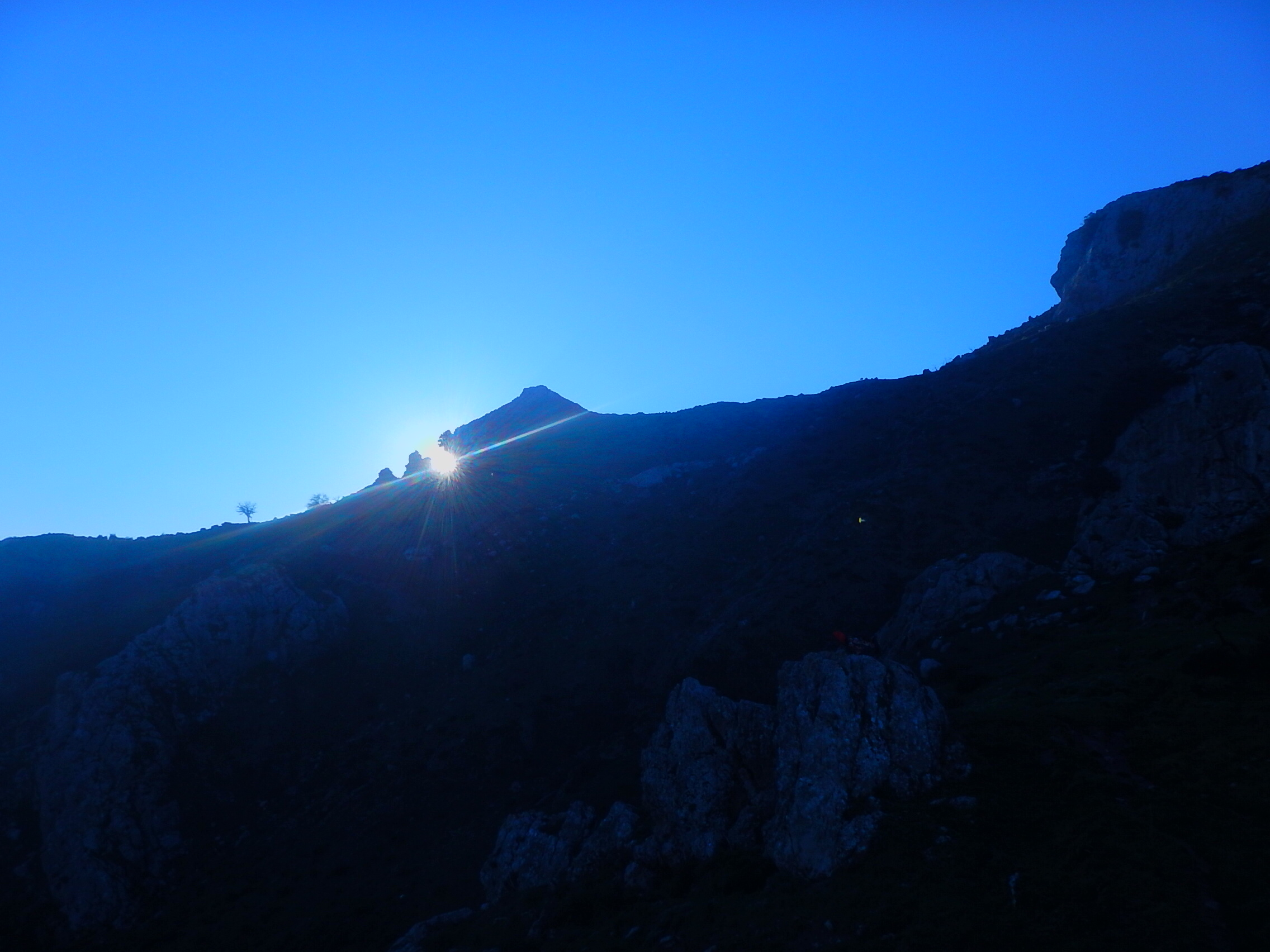
Equinox seen from the astronomical calendar of Pizzo Vento at Fondachelli-Fantina, Sicily

Many Upper Paleolithic cave paintings of animals from across western and central Europe are accompanied by sequences of dots and lines. It has been hypothesized that these are tally marks representing lunar months, with the year beginning at the end of winter. A branching "Y" symbol represents mating or birthing month for the associated animal, making each sequence a phenological calendar.

A number of prehistoric structures have been proposed as having had the purpose of timekeeping (typically keeping track of the course of the solar year). This includes many megalithic structures, and reconstructed arrangements going back far into the Neolithic period.

In Victoria, Australia, a Wurdi Youang stone arrangement could date back more than 11,000 years. This estimate is based on the inaccuracy of the calendar, which is consistent with how the Earth's supposed orbit is thought to have changed during that time. The site is found near the world's oldest known site of permanent aquaculture.

A Mesolithic arrangement of twelve pits and an arc found in Warren Field, Aberdeenshire, Scotland, dated to roughly 8,000 BC, has been described as a lunar calendar and was dubbed the "world's oldest known calendar" in 2013.

== Antiquity ==
=== Ancient Sumerian ===
The ancient Sumerian calendar, roughly dated to 2100 BC, divided a year into 12 lunar months of 29 or 30 days. Each month began with the sighting of a new moon. Sumerian months had no uniform name throughout Sumer because of the religious diversity. This resulted in scribes and scholars referring to them as "the first month", "the fifth month", etc. To keep the lunar year of 354 days in step with the solar year of 365.242 days an extra month was added periodically, much like a Gregorian leap year. There were no weeks in the Sumerian calendar. Holy days and time off from work were usually celebrated on the first, seventh and fifteenth of each month. In addition to these holy days, there were also feast days which varied from city to city.

=== Babylonia and Persia ===
Although the earliest evidence of Iranian calendrical traditions is from the second millennium BC, predating the appearance of the Iranian prophet Zoroaster, the first fully preserved calendar is that of the Achaemenids. Throughout recorded history, Persians have been keen on the idea and importance of having a calendar. They were among the first cultures to use a solar calendar and have long favoured a solar over lunar and lunisolar approaches. The sun has always been a symbol in Iranian culture and is closely related to the folklore regarding Cyrus the Great.

==== Old Persian calendar ====
Old Persian inscriptions and tablets indicate that early Iranians used a 360-day calendar based on the solar observation directly and modified for their beliefs. Days were not named. The months had two or three divisions depending on the phase of the moon. Twelve months of 30 days were named for festivals or activities of the pastoral year. A 13th month was added every six years to keep the calendar synchronized with the seasons.

==== Zoroastrian calendar ====
The first calendars based on Zoroastrian cosmology appeared in the later Achaemenid period (650 to 330 BC). They evolved over the centuries, but month names changed little until now.

The unified Achaemenid Empire required a distinctive Iranian calendar, and one was devised in Egyptian tradition, with 12 months of 30 days, each dedicated to a yazata (Eyzad), and four divisions resembling the Semitic week. Four days per month were dedicated to Ahura Mazda and seven were named after the six Amesha Spentas. Thirteen days were named after Fire, Water, Sun, Moon, Tiri and Geush Urvan (the soul of all animals), Mithra, Sraosha (Soroush, yazata of prayer), Rashnu (the Judge), Fravashi, Bahram (yazata of victory), Raman (Ramesh meaning peace), and Vata, the divinity of the wind. Three were dedicated to the female divinities, Daena (yazata of religion and personified conscious), Ashi (yazata of fortune) and Arshtat (justice). The remaining four were dedicated to Asman (lord of sky or Heaven), Zam (earth), Manthra Spenta (the Bounteous Sacred Word) and Anaghra Raocha (the 'Endless Light' of paradise).

==== Modifications by Parthians, Ardashir I, Hormizd I, Yazdgerd III ====
The Parthians (Arsacid dynasty) adopted the same calendar system with minor modifications, and dated their era from 248 BC, the date they succeeded the Seleucids. Their names for the months and days are Parthian equivalents of the Avestan ones used previously, differing slightly from the Middle Persian names used by the Sasanians. For example, in Achaemenid times the modern Persian month 'Day' was called Dadvah (Creator), in Parthian it was Datush, and the Sasanians named it Dadv/Dai (Dadar in Pahlavi).

When in April of AD 224 the Parthian dynasty fell and was replaced by the Sasanians, the new king, Ardashir I, abolished the official Babylonian calendar and replaced it with the Zoroastrian. This involved a correction to the places of the gahanbar, which had slipped back in the seasons since they were fixed. These were placed eight months later, as were the epagemonai, the 'Gatha' or 'Gah' days after the ancient Zoroastrian hymns of the same name. Other countries, such as the Armenians and Choresmians, did not accept the change.

==== The formation of the current Persian calendar in the 11th century ====
Toghril Beg, the founder of the Seljuk dynasty, had made Esfahan the capital of his domains and his grandson Malik-Shah was the ruler of that city from 1073. An invitation was sent to Khayyam from Malik-Shah and from his vizier Nizam al-Mulk asking Khayyam to go to Esfahan to set up an Observatory there. Other leading astronomers were also brought to the Observatory in Esfahan and for 18 years Khayyam led the scientists and produced work of outstanding quality. During this time Khayyam led work on compiling astronomical tables and he also contributed to calendar reform in 1079.

Cowell quotes the Calcutta Review No 59:

When the Malik Shah determined to reform the calendar, Omar was one of the eight learned men employed to do it, the result was the Jalali era (so called from Jalal-ud-din, one of the king's names) – 'a computation of time,' says Gibbon, 'which surpasses the Julian, and approaches the accuracy of the Gregorian style.'

Khayyam measured the length of the year as 365.24219858156 days. Two comments on this result. Firstly it shows an incredible confidence to attempt to give the result to this degree of accuracy. We know now that the length of the year is changing in the sixth decimal place over a person's lifetime. Secondly it is outstandingly accurate. For comparison the length of the year at the end of the 19th century was 365.242196 days, while today it is 365.242190 days.

=== Classical Greece ===
The Greeks, as early as the time of Homer, appear to have been familiar with the division of the year into the twelve lunar months but no intercalary month Embolimos or day is then mentioned. Independent of the division of a month into days, it was divided into periods according to the increase and decrease of the moon. Thus, the first day or new moon was called Noumenia. The month in which the year began, as well as the names of the months, differed among the states, and in some parts even no names existed for the months, as they were distinguished only numerically, as the first, second, third, fourth month, etc.

The ancient Athenian calendar was a lunisolar calendar with 354-day years, consisting of twelve months of alternating length of 29 or 30 days. To keep the calendar in line with the solar year of 365.242189 days, an extra, intercalary month was added in the years: 3, 6, 8, 11, 14, 17, 19 of the 19-years Metonic cycle. See About the structure of the Attic Calendar The Athenian months were called Hekatombion, Metageitnion, Boedromion, Pyanepsion, Maimakterion, Poseidon, Gamelion, Anthesterion, Elaphebolion, Munychion, Thargelion, and Skirophorion. The intercalary month usually came after Poseidon, and was called second Poseidon. See also: Athenian Calendar. A reconstruction of the Attic Calendar is given by Academy of Episteme.

In addition to their regular, "festival" calendar, the Athenians maintained a second, political calendar. This "conciliar" calendar divided the year into "prytanies", one for each of the "phylai", the subdivisions of Athenian citizens. The number of phylai, and hence the number of prytanies, varied over time. Until 307 BC, there were 10 phylai. After that the number varies between 11 and 13 (usually 12). Even more confusing, while the conciliar and festival years were about the same length in the 4th century BC, such was not regularly the case earlier or later. Documents dated by prytany are frequently very difficult to assign to a particular equivalent in the Julian calendar.

The table of Greek Olympiads, following the four-year cycles between the Olympic Games from 1 July 776 BC, continued until the end of the 4th century AD. The Babylonian Era of Nabonassar, beginning on 26 February 747 BC, was used by the Greeks of Alexandria. It was later known in the Middle Ages from the works of Ptolemy.

=== Hellenistic period ===
The Greek calendars were greatly diversified by the Hellenistic period, with separate traditions in every Greek state. Of primary importance for the reconstruction of the regional Greek calendars is the calendar of Delphi, because of the numerous documents found there recording the manumission of slaves, many of which are dated both in the Delphian and in a regional calendar.

The Roman Republican calendar numbered years based on the sitting consuls. References to the year of consulship were used in both conversation and official records. Romans from the same family often had the same praenomen, which sometimes makes it difficult to distinguish them, and there were two consuls at any one time, each of whom might sometimes hold the appointment more than once, meaning that it was (and is) necessary to be well educated in history to understand the references. The Romans had an eight-day week, with the market-day falling every eight days. It was called a nundinum or 'nine-day' in inclusive counting.

Most of the regional Hindu calendars are inherited from a system standardized in classical Hindu astronomy as adopted via Indo-Greek transmission in the final centuries BC, and reformed by Gupta era astronomers such as Aryabhata and Varāhamihira.

=== China ===
Before the Spring and Autumn period (before 770 BC), the Chinese calendars were solar calendars. In the so-called five-phase calendar, the year consists of 10 months and a transition, each month being 36 days long, and the transitions 5 or 6 days. During the Warring States period (~475–220 BC), the primitive lunisolar calendars were established under the Zhou Dynasty, known as the six ancient calendars (simplified Chinese: 古六历; traditional Chinese: 古六曆). The months of these calendars begin on the day with the new moon, with 12 or 13 months (lunations) in a year. The intercalary month is placed at the end of the year. In Qin China, the Qin calendar (simplified Chinese: 秦历; traditional Chinese: 秦曆) was introduced. It follows the rules of Zhuanxu's calendar, but the months order follows the Xia's calendar.

=== Vedic Era /Ancient India ===
Timekeeping was important to Vedic rituals, and Jyotisha was the Vedic-era field of tracking and predicting the movements of astronomical bodies in order to keep time, in order to fix the day and time of these rituals, which were developed around the end of 2nd millennium BC as mentioned in "Sathapatha Brahmana". This study was one of the six ancient Vedangas, or ancillary science connected with the Vedas – the scriptures of Hinduism, which was quoted by 5th-century BC scholar Yaska. The ancient extant text on Jyotisha is the Vedanga-Jyotisha, which exists in two editions, one linked to Rigveda and other to Yajurveda. The Rigveda version is variously attributed to sage Lagadha, and sometimes to sage Shuci. The Yajurveda version credits no particular sage, has survived into the modern era with a commentary of Somakara, and is the more studied version.

The Jyotisha text Brahma-siddhanta, probably composed in the 5th century AD, discusses how to use the movement of planets, sun and moon to keep time and calendar. This text also lists trigonometry and mathematical formulae to support its theory of orbital, predict planetary positions and calculate relative mean positions of celestial nodes and apsides. The text is notable for presenting very large integers, such as 4.32 billion years as the lifetime of the current universe.

Water clock and sun dials are mentioned in many ancient Hindu texts such as the Arthashastra. The Jyotisha texts present mathematical formulae to predict the length of day time, sun rise and moon cycles.

The modern Hindu calendar, sometimes referred to as Panchanga, is a collective term for the various lunisolar calendars traditionally used in Hinduism. They adopt a similar underlying concept for timekeeping, but differ in their relative emphasis on the moon cycle or the sun cycle, the names of months and when they consider the New Year to start. The ancient Hindu calendar is similar in conceptual design to the Jewish calendar, but different from the Gregorian calendar. Unlike the Gregorian calendar which adds additional days to the lunar month to adjust for the mismatch between twelve lunar cycles (354 lunar days) and nearly 365 solar days, the Hindu calendar maintains the integrity of the lunar month, but inserts an extra full month according to complex rules, every few years, to ensure that the festivals and crop related rituals fall in the appropriate season.

The Hindu calendars have been in use in the Indian subcontinent since ancient times, and remain in use by the Hindus in India and Nepal, particularly to set Hindu festival dates. Early Buddhist and Jain communities of India adopted the ancient Hindu calendar, later Vikrami calendar and then local Buddhist calendars. Buddhist and Jain festivals continue to be scheduled according to a lunar system in the luni-solar calendar.

=== Roman Empire ===
The old Roman year had 304 days divided into 10 months, beginning with March. However the ancient historian Livy gave credit to the second early Roman king Numa Pompilius for devising a calendar of 12 months. The extra months Ianuarius and Februarius had been invented, supposedly by Numa Pompilius, as stop-gaps. Julius Caesar realized that the system had become inoperable, so he effected drastic changes in the year of his third consulship. The New Year in 709 AUC began on 1 January and ran over 365 days until 31 December. Further adjustments were made under Augustus, who introduced the concept of the "leap year" in 757 AUC (AD 4). The resultant Julian calendar remained in almost universal use in Europe until 1582, and in some countries until as late as the twentieth century.

In the first century BC, Marcus Terentius Varro introduced the Ab urbe condita epoch, assuming a foundation of Rome in 753 BC. The system remained in use during the early Middle Ages until the widespread adoption of the Dionysian era in the Carolingian period.

In the Roman Empire, the AUC year could be used alongside the consular year, so that the consulship of Quintus Fufius Calenus and Publius Vatinius could be determined as 707 AUC (or 47 BC), the third consulship of Caius Julius Caesar, with Marcus Aemilius Lepidus, as 708 AUC (or 46 BC), and the fourth consulship of Gaius Julius Caesar as 709 AUC (or 45 BC).

The seven-day week has a tradition reaching back to the ancient Near East, but the introduction of the "planetary week" which remains in modern use dates to the Roman Empire period (see also Names of the days of the week).

== Middle Ages ==
=== Christian Europe ===
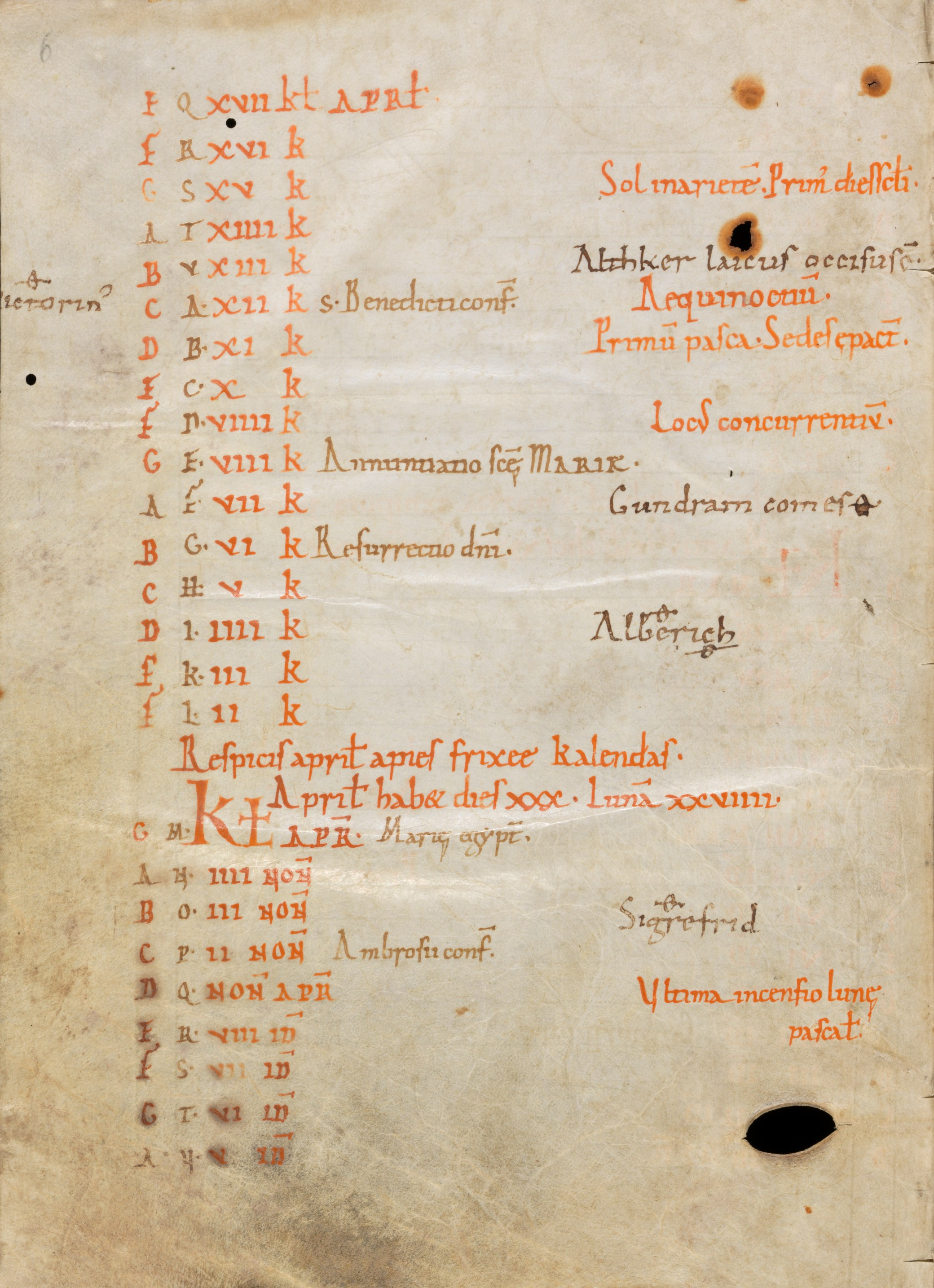
Page of a 10th-century calendar from Einsiedeln Abbey (16 March to 9 April)

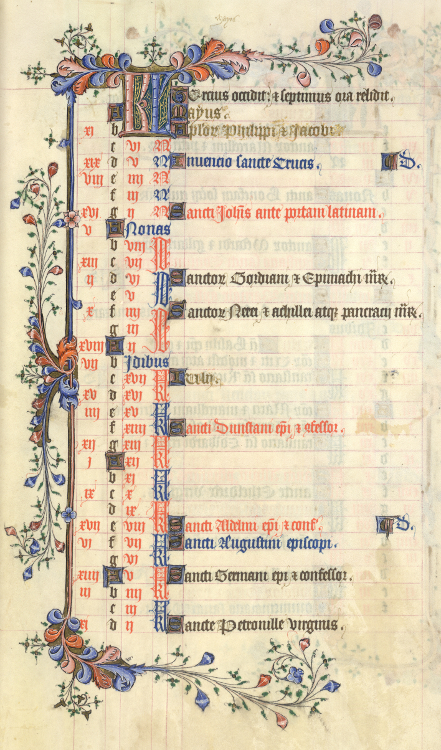
The page for May in the Bedford Psalter and Hours ms. (British Library Add MS 42131, fol. 3r, early 15th century)

The oldest calendar of saints of the Church of Rome was compiled in the mid-4th century, under Pope Julius I or Pope Liberius. It contained both pagan and Christian festivals. The oldest extant manuscript of the early Christian calendar is the so-called Calendar of Filocalus, produced in AD 354. A more extensive martyrology was compiled by Jerome in the early 5th century. Jean Mabillon published a calendar of the church of Carthage made in ca. AD 483. The Anno Domini epoch is introduced in the 6th century. Extant calendars of the early medieval period are based on Jerome's system of numbering of the years of the Metonic cycle, later called the Golden Numbers. A Carolingian-era calendar published by Luc d'Achery is entitled Incipit Ordo Solaris Anni cum Litteris a S. Hieronymo superpositis, ad explorandum Septimanae Diem, et Lunae Aetatem investigandam in unoquoque Die per xix Annos. ("here begins the order of the solar year with the letters placed by Saint Jerome, for the purpose of finding the day of the week and the age of the Moon for any day within [the cycle of] 19 years"). The Leiden Aratea, a Carolingian copy (dated 816) of an astronomical treatise of Germanicus, is an important source for the transmission of the ancient Christian calendar to the medieval period.

In the 8th century, the Anglo-Saxon historian Bede the Venerable used another Latin term, "ante uero incarnationis dominicae tempus" ("the time before the Lord's true incarnation", equivalent to the English "before Christ"), to identify years before the first year of this era. According to the Catholic Encyclopedia, even Popes continued to date documents according to regnal years, and usage of AD only gradually became common in Europe from the 11th to the 14th centuries. In 1422, Portugal became the last Western European country to adopt the Anno Domini system.

The Icelandic calendar was introduced in the 10th century. While the ancient Germanic calendars were based on lunar months, the new Icelandic calendar introduced a purely solar reckoning, with a year having a fixed number of weeks (52 weeks or 364 days). This necessitated the introduction of "leap weeks" instead of the Julian leap days.

In 1267, the medieval scientist Roger Bacon stated the times of full moons as a number of hours, minutes, seconds, thirds, and fourths (horae, minuta, secunda, tertia, and quarta) after noon on specified calendar dates. Although a third for 1/60 of a second remains in some languages, for example Arabic ثالثة (ṯāliṯa /θaː.liθa/), the modern second is further divided decimally.

Rival calendar eras to Anno Domini remained in use in Christian Europe. In Spain, the "Era of the Caesars" was dated from Octavian's conquest of Iberia in 39 BC. It was adopted by the Visigoths and remained in use in Catalonia until 1180, Castille until 1382 and Portugal until 1415.

For chronological purposes, the flaw of the Anno Domini system was that dates have to be reckoned backwards or forwards according as they are BC or AD. According to the Catholic Encyclopedia, "in an ideally perfect system all events would be reckoned in one sequence. The difficulty was to find a starting point whence to reckon, for the beginnings of history in which this should naturally be placed are those of which chronologically we know least." For both Christians and Jews, the prime historical date was the Year of Creation, or Annus Mundi. The Eastern Orthodox Church fixed the date of Creation at 5509 BC. This remained the basis of the ecclesiastical calendar in the Greek and Russian Orthodox world until modern times. The Coptic Church fixed on 5500 BC. Later, the Church of England, under Archbishop Ussher in 1650, would pick 4004 BC.

=== Islamic calendar ===
The Islamic calendar is based on the prohibition of intercalation (nasi') by Muhammad, in Islamic tradition dated to a sermon held on 9 Dhu al-Hijjah AH 10 (Julian date: 6 March 632). This resulted in an observationally based lunar calendar shifting relative to the seasons of the solar year.

During the Mughal rule, the land taxes were collected from Bengali people according to the Islamic Hijri calendar. This calendar was a lunar calendar, and its new year did not coincide with the solar agricultural cycles. According to some sources, Mughal Emperor Akbar asked his royal astronomer Fathullah Shirazi to create a new calendar by combining the lunar Islamic calendar and solar Hindu calendar already in use, and this was known as Fasholi shan (harvest calendar). According to Amartya Sen, Akbar's official calendar "Tarikh-ilahi" with the zero year of 1556 AD was a blend of pre-existing Hindu and Islamic calendars. It was not used much in India outside of Akbar's Mughal court, and after his death the calendar he launched was abandoned. However, adds Sen, there are traces of the "Tarikh-ilahi" that survive in the Bengali calendar. Some historians attribute the Bengali calendar to the 7th-century Hindu king Shashanka.

=== Other ===
The ancient Taichu calendar of China was refined in the medieval period. The Dàmíng Calendar (大明历; 大明曆; 'brightest calendar'), created in the Liang dynasty by Zu Chongzhi, introduced the equinoxes. The use of a syzygy to determine the lunar month was first described in the Tang dynasty Wùyín Yuán Calendar (戊寅元历; 戊寅元曆; 'earth tiger epoch calendar').

The Yuan dynasty (13th/14th century) Shòushí calendar (授时历; 授时曆; 'teaching time calendar') used spherical trigonometry to find the length of the tropical year. This calendar had a 365.2425-day year, identical to the Gregorian calendar.

A number of other epichoric calendars are tentatively reconstructed for the medieval period. Such reconstructions are mostly limited to a list of month names, as is the case with the pre-Christian Germanic calendar as well as with the Bulgar calendar, which was supposedly in use among the Bulgars in the 10th century, as reconstructed from the 15th-century Nominalia of the Bulgarian khans.

== Sub-Saharan African ==
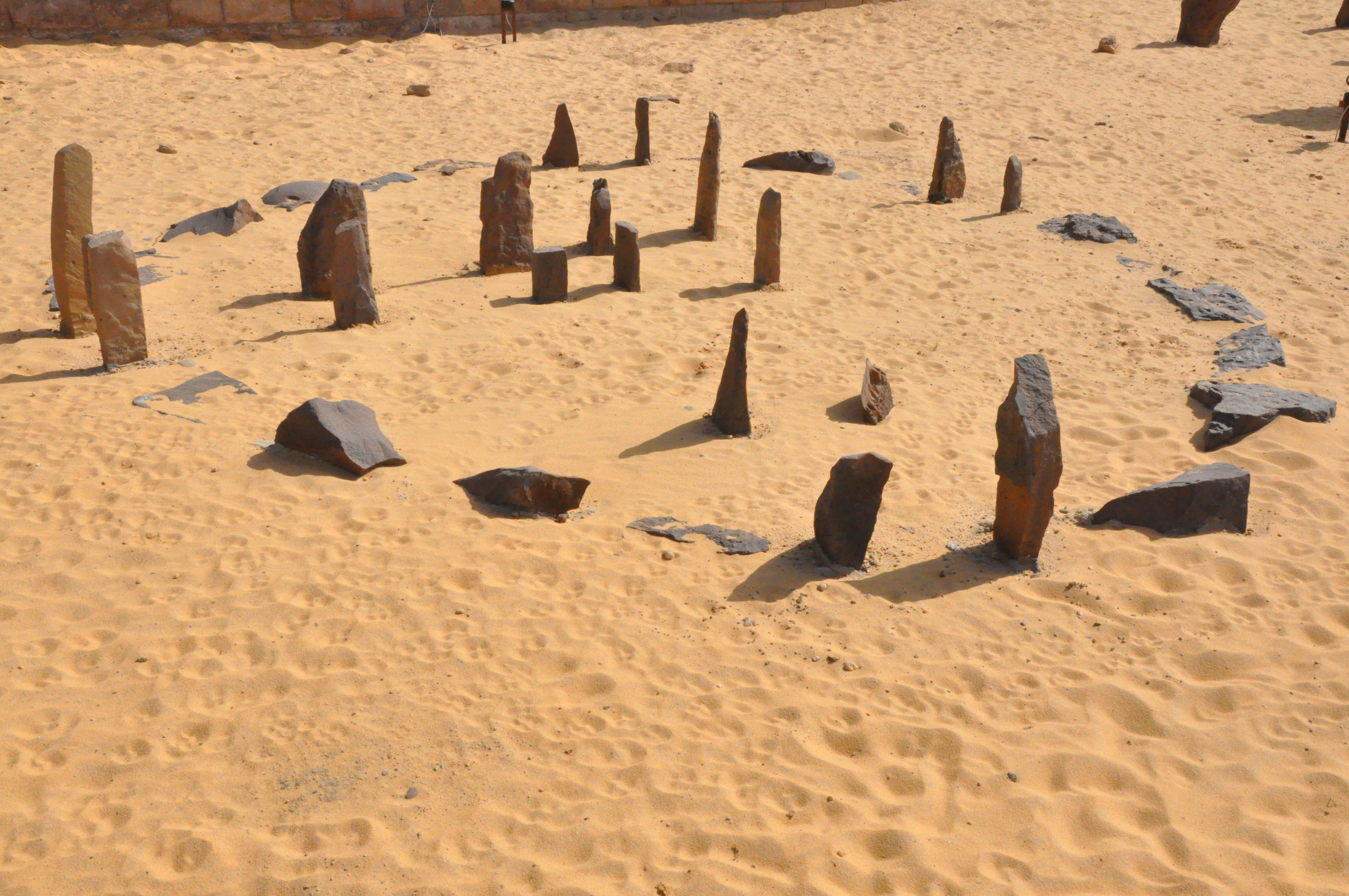
Calendar circle from Nabta Playa.

=== Ethiopian Calendar ===
The Ge'ez or Ethiopian Calendar is a calendar originating from the Ethiopian Empire. It is the liturgical year for Ethiopian and Eritrean Christians belonging to the Orthodox Tewahedo Churches and closely follows the Coptic Christian calendar.

A useful chart providing all the equivalents can be found in Chaîne's book on chronology in Ethiopia and Egypt, and can easily be consulted online at the Internet Archive, from page 134 to page 172.

=== Nigerian Calendars ===
The Igbo calendar is the traditional calendar system of the Igbo people from present-day Nigeria. The calendar has 13 months in a year (afo), 7 weeks in a month (onwa), and 4 days of Igbo market days (afor, nkwo, eke, and orie) in a week (izu) plus an extra day at the end of the year, in the last month. The name of these months was reported by Onwuejeogwu (1981). The Yoruba calendar is a calendar used by the Yoruba people of southwestern and north central Nigeria and southern Benin. The calendar has a year beginning on the last moon of May or first moon of June of the Gregorian calendar. The new year coincides with the Ifá festival. The traditional Yoruba week has four days, the four days that are dedicated to the Orisa.

=== Ghana/West African ===
The Akan Calendar is a Calendar created by the Akan people (a Kwa group of West Africa) who appear to have used a traditional system of timekeeping based on a six-day week (known as nnanson "seven-days" via inclusive counting). The Gregorian seven-day week is known as nnawɔtwe (eight-days). The combination of these two system resulted in periods of 40 days, known as adaduanan (meaning "forty days").

=== Xhosa Calendar ===
The traditional isiXhosa names for months of the year poetically come from names of stars, plants, and flowers that grow or seasonal changes that happen at a given time of year in Southern Africa.

The Xhosa year traditionally begins in June and ends in May when one of the brightest stars visible in the Southern Hemisphere, Canopus, signals the time for harvesting.

== Mesoamerica ==
Of all the ancient calendar systems, the Maya and other Mesoamerican systems are the most complex. The Mayan calendar had two years, the 260-day Sacred Round, or tzolkin, and the 365-day Vague Year, or haab.

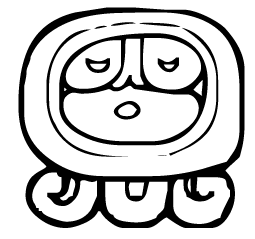
A modern pictogram of the Mayan god Ahau, after which the 20th day of the tzolkin cycle was named

The Sacred Round of 260 days is composed of two smaller cycles: the numbers 1 through 13, coupled with 20 different day names: Imix, Ik, Akbal, Kan, Chicchan, Cimi, Manik, Lamat, Muluc, Oc, Chuen, Eb, Ben, Ix, Men, Cib, Caban, Eiznab, Cauac, and Ahau. The Sacred Round was used to determine important activities related to the gods and humans: name individuals, predict the future, decide on auspicious dates for battles, marriages, and so on.

The two cycles of 13 and 20 intermesh and are repeated without interruption: the cycle would begin with 1 Imix, then 2 Ik, then 3 Akbal and so on until the number 13 was reached, at which point the number cycle was restarted so 13 Ben would be followed by 1 Ix, 2 Men and so on. This time Imix would be numbered 8. The cycle ended after 260 days, with the last day being 13 Ahau.

The Vague Year of 365 days is similar to the modern Gregorian calendar, consisting of 18 months of 20 days each, with an unlucky five-day period at the end. The Vague Year had to do primarily with the seasons and agriculture, and was based on the solar cycle. The 18 Maya months are known, in order, as: Pop, Uo, Zip, Zotz, Tzec, Xuc, Yaxkin, Mol, Chen, Yax, Zac, Ceh, Mac, Kankin, Maun, Pax, Kayab and Cumku. The unlucky five-day period was known as Uayeb, and was considered a time which could hold danger, death and bad luck.

The Vague Year began with the month of Pop. The Maya 20-day month always begins with the seating of the month, followed by days numbered 1 to 19, then the seating of the following month, and so on. This ties in with the Maya notion that each month influences the next. The Maya new year would start with 1 Pop, followed by 2 Pop, all the way through to 19 Pop, followed by the seating of the month of Uo, written as 0 Uo, then 1 Uo, 2 Uo and so on. These two cycles coincided every 52 years. The 52-year period of time was called a "bundle" and was similar to a modern-day century.

== Modern calendars ==
While the Gregorian calendar is now in worldwide use for secular purposes, various medieval or ancient calendars remain in regional use for religious or social purposes, including the Julian calendar, the Hebrew calendar, the Islamic calendar, various Hindu calendars, the Zoroastrian calendar, etc.

There are also various modern calendars that see limited use, either created for the use of new religious movements or reformed versions of older religious calendars, or calendars introduced by regionalist or nationalist movements.

- Javanese calendar (1633)
- Jōkyō calendar (1685)
- French Republican calendar (1793)
- Baháʼí calendar (1873)
- Solar Hijri calendar (1925)
- Pataphysical calendar (1949)
- Indian national calendar (1957)
- Discordian calendar (1963)
- Juche calendar (1997)

== See also ==
- Names of the days of the week
- History of timekeeping devices
