= Names of the days of the week =

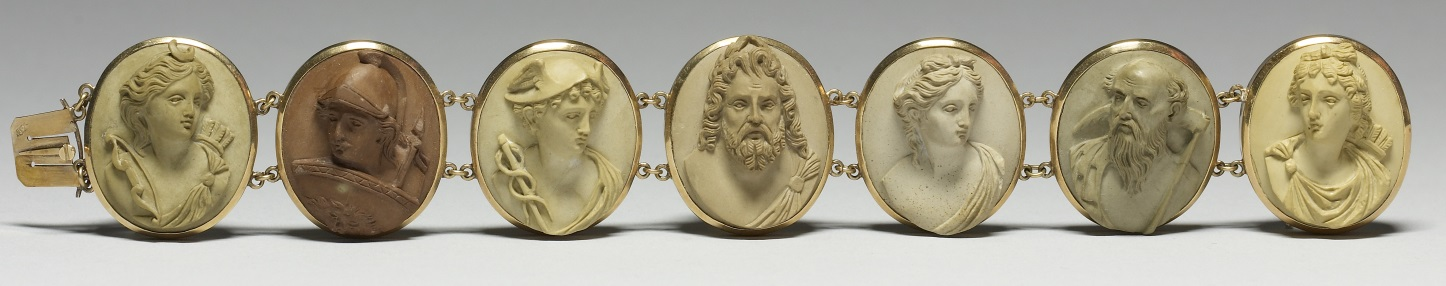
Italian cameo bracelet representing the days of the week, corresponding to the planets as Roman gods: Diana as the Moon for Monday, Mars for Tuesday, Mercury for Wednesday, Jupiter for Thursday, Venus for Friday, Saturn for Saturday, and Apollo as the Sun for Sunday. Middle 19th century, Walters Art Museum

In a vast number of languages, the names given to the seven days of the week are derived from the names of the seven classical planets which were in turn named after contemporary Hellenistic deities. This system was introduced by the Sumerians and later adopted by the Babylonians from whom the Roman Empire adopted the system during late antiquity. In some other languages, the days are named after corresponding deities of the regional culture, such as the Germanic deities reflected in the English weekdays.

The seven-day week was adopted in early Christianity from the Hebrew calendar, and gradually replaced the Roman internundinum. Eight-day and seven-day weeks existed side-by-side until the Emperor Constantine made the seven-day week official in AD 321; thereafter, the seven-day week spread throughout the Roman Empire and eventually through Christian cultures around the world.

The history of the seven-day week can be traced to ancient civilizations. Sunday remained the first day of the week, being considered the day of the sun god Sol Invictus and the Lord's Day, while the Jewish Sabbath remained the seventh. Most historians agree the seven-day week dates back to Babylonians who started using it about 4,000 years ago. The number 7 was sacred to the Babylonians. Emperor Constantine of the Roman Empire made the Day of the Sun (dies Solis, "Sunday") a legal holiday centuries later.

In the international standard ISO 8601, Monday is treated as the first day of the week, but in many countries it is counted as the second day of the week.

== Days named after planets ==
=== Greco-Roman tradition ===
Between the first and third centuries AD, the Roman Empire gradually replaced the eight-day Roman nundinal cycle with the seven-day week. The earliest evidence for this new system is a Pompeiian graffito referring to 6 February 60 AD (ante diem viii idus Februarias) as dies solis ("Sunday"). Another early witness is a reference to a lost treatise by Plutarch, written in about 100 AD, which addressed the question of: "Why are the days named after the planets reckoned in a different order from the 'actual' order?" The treatise is lost, but the answer to the question is known; see planetary hours.

The Ptolemaic system of planetary spheres asserts that the order of the heavenly bodies from the farthest to the closest to the Earth is Saturn, Jupiter, Mars, Sun, Venus, Mercury, and the Moon; objectively, the planets are ordered from slowest to fastest moving as they appear in the night sky.

The days were named after the classical planets of Hellenistic astrology, in the order: Sun (Helios), Moon (Selene), Mars (Ares), Mercury (Hermes), Jupiter (Zeus), Venus (Aphrodite), and Saturn (Cronus).

The seven-day week spread throughout the Roman Empire in late antiquity. By the 4th century AD, it was in wide use throughout the Empire. However, after the fall of the Byzantine empire the traditional Hellenistic names stopped being used in Greek, and the modern Greek language now uses new names.

The Ancient Greek and Latin names are as follows:

Day	Sunday Sun	Monday Moon	Tuesday Mars	Wednesday Mercury	Thursday Jupiter	Friday Venus	Saturday Saturn
Ancient Greek	ἡμέρα Ἡλίου, hēméra Hēlíou	ἡμέρα Σελήνης, hēméra Selḗnēs	ἡμέρα Ἄρεως, hēméra Áreōs	ἡμέρα Ἑρμοῦ, hēméra Hermoû	ἡμέρα Διός, hēméra Diós	ἡμέρα Ἀφροδίτης, hēméra Aphrodítēs	ἡμέρα Κρόνου, hēméra Krónou
Latin	diēs Sōlis	diēs Lūnae	diēs Mārtis	diēs Mercuriī	diēs Iovis	diēs Veneris	diēs Sāturnī

==== Romance languages ====
Except for in Portuguese and Mirandese, the Romance languages preserved the Latin names, except for the names of Sunday, which was replaced by [dies] Dominicus (Dominica), that is, "the Lord's Day", and of Saturday, which was named for the Jewish Sabbath. Mirandese and Portuguese use numbered weekdays, but retain sábado and demingo/domingo for weekends. Meanwhile, Galician occasionally uses them alongside the traditional Latin-derived names, albeit to a lesser extent (see below).

Day (see Irregularities)	Sunday diēs Dominicus, 'Lord's Day'	Monday diēs Lūnae, 'day of the Moon'	Tuesday diēs Mārtis, 'day of Mars'	Wednesday diēs Mercuriī, 'day of Mercury'	Thursday diēs Iovis, 'day of Jupiter'	Friday diēs Veneris, 'day of Venus'	Saturday diēs Sabbatī, 'day of the Sabbath'
Aragonese	domingo; domenche; dominche	lunes; luns; lluns; llunes; deluns; delluns	martes; marts; marz	miércols; miercres; mierques	chueves; chueus; chous; dechous	viernes; devierns	sabado; sapte
Aranese Occitan	dimenge	deluns	dimars	dimèrcles	dijaus	diuendres	dissabte
Asturian	domingu	llunes	martes	miércoles	xueves	vienres	sábadu
Catalan	diumenge	dilluns	dimarts	dimecres	dijous	divendres	dissabte
Corsican	dumenica	luni	marti	mercuri; marcuri	ghjovi	vennari	sabbatu; sabatu; sapatu
French	dimanche	lundi	mardi	mercredi	jeudi	vendredi	samedi
Friulian	domenie	lunis	martars	miercus; miercui	joibe	vinars	sabide; sàbide
Galician	domingo	luns; segunda feira	martes; terza feira; terceira feira	mércores; corta feira; cuarta feira	xoves; quinta feira	venres; sexta feira	sábado
Italian	domenica	lunedì	martedì	mercoledì	giovedì	venerdì	sabato
Ladin (Gherdëina)	domenia; dumënia	lunesc; lunesc	mertesc; merdi	mercol; mierculdi	jebia; juebia	vender; vënderdi	sabeda; sada
Ladin (Val Badia)	domenia; domënia	lunesc; lönesc	mertesc; dedolönesc	mercol; mercui; dedemesaledema	jebia; jöbia	vender; vëndres	sabeda
Ligurian	doménega	lunedì	martedì	mèrcoledì	zéuggia	venerdì	sàbbo
Lombard (Bresciano)	duminica	lunedé	martedé	mercoldé	gioedé	venerdé	sabot
Lombard (Milanese)	domenega	lunedì	martedì	mercoldì	giovedì	venerdì	sabet
Neapolitan	dumeneca; dummeneca; dommeneca	lunnerì	marterì	miercurì	gioverì	viernarì	sàbbatu
Occitan	dimenge	diluns	dimars	dimècres	dijòus	divendres	dissabte
Portuguese	domingo	segunda-feira	terça-feira	quarta-feira	quinta-feira	sexta-feira	sábado
Romanian	duminică; duminecă	luni	marți	miercuri	joi	vineri	sâmbătă
Romansh (Putèr)	dumengia	lündeschdi	mardi	marculdi	gövgia	venderdi	sanda
Romansh (Rumantsch Grischun)	dumengia	glindesdi	mardi	mesemna	gievgia	venderdi	sonda
Romansh (Surmiran)	dumengia	glindasde	marde	mesemda	gievgia	vendarde	sonda
Romansh (Sursilvan)	dumengia	gliendisdis	mardis	mesjamna	gievgia	venderdis	sonda
Romansh (Sutsilvan)	dumeingia	gliendasgis	margis	measeanda	gievgia	vendergis	sonda
Romansh (Vallader)	dumengia	lündeschdi	mardi	marcurdi	gövgia	venderdi	sonda
Sardinian	domìniga; domiga; etc. (Note: Also domigu, domingu, domínica, dominica, domínigu, dumínica, dumíniga.)	lunis	martis; maltis	mélcuris; mércunis; etc. (Note: Also mércuis, mérculis, mércuris.)	gióbia; gioja; etc. (Note: Also gióvia, zóbia, giògia, zògia.)	chenabura; cenarva; etc. (Note: Also canàbara, cenàbara, cenàbera, cenàbura, cenarba, chenàbara, chenabra, chenapra, chenàpura, chenarpa, chenàura, cianàbara.)	sàpadu; sàuru; etc. (Note: Also sàbadu, sàbudu, sàburu, sàpatu.)
Sicilian	dumìnica; duminicadìa	luni; lunidìa	marti; martidìa	mèrcuri; mercuridìa	jovi; jovidìa	vènniri; venniridìa	sàbbatu; sabbatudìa
Spanish	domingo	lunes	martes	miércoles	jueves	viernes	sábado
Venetian	domenega	luni	marti	mèrcore	zioba	vènere; vènare	sabo

==== Celtic languages ====
Early Old Irish adopted the names from Latin, but introduced separate terms of Norse origin for Wednesday, Thursday and Friday, then later supplanted these with terms relating to church fasting practices.

Day (see Irregularities)	Sunday diēs Dominicus, 'Lord's Day'	Monday diēs Lūnae, 'day of the Moon'	Tuesday diēs Mārtis, 'day of Mars'	Wednesday cétaín, 'first fast'	Thursday eter dá aín, 'between fasts'	Friday aín, 'fast'	Saturday diēs Sāturnī, 'day of Saturn'
Irish	Domhnach	Luan	Máirt	Céadaoin	Déardaoin	Aoine	Satharn
Manx	Jedoonee; Doonaght	Jelhein; Lhein; Jelune	Mayrt; Jemayrt	Jecrean	Jerdein; Jardain	Jeheiney; Jemayrt	Jesarn; Sarn
Old Irish	diu srol; dies scrol	diu luna	diu mart	diu iath	diu eathamon	diu triach	diu saturn
Old Irish (later)	domnach; diu domnica	lúan; diu luna	Máirt; diu mart	cétaín; diu cétaín	dardaín; tardaín; diu eter dib aínib	aín dídine; diu aíne	Satharn; diu saturn
Scottish Gaelic	Didòmhnaich; Latha/Là na Sàbaid	Diluain	Dimàirt	Diciadain	Diardaoin	Dihaoine	Disathairne

In Welsh, the word for ‘day’ dydd is replaced by the words for ‘morning' bore, ’night’ nos or ‘afternoon’ prynhawn, etc to say ‘Monday morning’ bore Llun, or ‘Friday night’ nos Wener, etc. It is never *nos dydd Llun or *bore dydd Llun which are ungrammatical.

Day	Sunday diēs Sōlis, 'day of the Sun'	Monday diēs Lūnae, 'day of the Moon'	Tuesday diēs Mārtis, 'day of Mars'	Wednesday diēs Mercuriī, 'day of Mercury'	Thursday diēs Iovis, 'day of Jupiter'	Friday diēs Veneris, 'day of Venus'	Saturday diēs Sāturnī, 'day of Saturn'
Breton	disul; Sul	dilun; Lun	dimeurzh; Meurzh	dimerc'her; Merc’her	diriaou; Yaou	digwener; Gwener	disadorn; Sadorn
Cornish	dy'Sul	dy'Lun	dy'Meurth	dy'Mergher	dy'Yow	dy'Gwener	dy'Sadorn
Welsh	dydd Sul	dydd Llun	dydd Mawrth	dydd Mercher	dydd Iau	dydd Gwener	dydd Sadwrn

==== Albanian language ====
Albanian adopted the Latin terms for Tuesday, Wednesday and Saturday, translated the Latin terms for Sunday and Monday using the native names of Diell and Hënë, respectively, and replaced the Latin terms for Thursday and Friday with the equivalent native deity names Enji and Prende, respectively.

Day	Sunday diell	Monday hënë	Tuesday diēs Mārtis, 'day of Mars'	Wednesday diēs Mercuriī, 'day of Mercury'	Thursday Enji	Friday Prende	Saturday diēs Sāturnī, 'day of Saturn'
Albanian	e diel	e hënë	e martë	e mërkurë	e enjte	e premte	e shtunë

==== Adoptions from Romance ====
Other languages adopted the week together with the Latin (Romance) names for the days of the week in the colonial period. Several constructed languages also adopted the Latin terminology.

Day (see Irregularities)	Sunday diēs Sōlis, 'day of the Sun'	Monday diēs Lūnae, 'day of the Moon'	Tuesday diēs Mārtis, 'day of Mars'	Wednesday diēs Mercuriī, 'day of Mercury'	Thursday diēs Iovis, 'day of Jupiter'	Friday diēs Veneris, 'day of Venus'	Saturday diēs Sāturnī, 'day of Saturn'
ApI Interlingua	sol-die	luna-die	marte-die	mercurio-die	jove-die	venere-die	sabbato (Note: From Sabbath.); saturno-die
Idiom Neutral	soldi	lundi	marsdi	merkurdi	yovdi	vendrdi	saturndi
Ido	sundio	lundio	mardio	merkurdio	jovdio	venerdio	saturdio
INTAL	sundi	lundi	mardi	merkurdi	jodi	venerdi	saturdi
Interlingue	soledí	lunedí	mardí	mercurdí	jovedí	venerdí	saturdí
Lingua Franca Nova	soldi	lundi	martedi	mercurdi	jovedi	venerdi	saturdi
Mondial	soldi	lundi	mardi	mierdi	jodi	vendi	samdi
Novial	sundie	lundie	mardie	mercurdie; merkurdie (older)	jodie	venerdie	saturdie
Reform-Neutral	soldí	lundí	marsdí	mercurdí	jovdí	vendredí	saturndí
Uropi	Soldia	Lundia	Mardia	Mididia (Note: From position of the day as "middle" of the week.)	Zusdia	Wendia	Sabadia

Day (see Irregularities)	Sunday diēs Dominicus, 'Lord's Day'	Monday diēs Lūnae, 'day of the Moon'	Tuesday diēs Mārtis, 'day of Mars'	Wednesday diēs Mercuriī, 'day of Mercury'	Thursday diēs Iovis, 'day of Jupiter'	Friday diēs Veneris, 'day of Venus'	Saturday diēs Sabbatī, 'day of the Sabbath'
Chamorro	Damenggo	Lunes	Måttes	Metkoles	Huebes	Betnes	Såbalu
Esperanto	dimanĉo	lundo	mardo	merkredo	ĵaŭdo	vendredo	sabato
Filipino	Linggó; Linggo	Lunes	Martés; Martes	Miyérkolés; Miyerkoles	Huwebes; Webes colloquial	Biyernes	Sabado
Interlingua	dominica	lunedi	martedi	mercuridi	jovedi	venerdi	sabbato
Māori	Rātapu [not celestially named] (rā + tapu = "holy day")	Rāhina (rā + Māhina = day + Moon)	Rātū (rā + Tūmatauenga = day + Mars)	Rāapa (rā + Apārangi = day + Mercury)	Rāpare (rā + Pareārau = day + Jupiter)	Rāmere (rā + Mere = day + Venus)	Rāhoroi [not celestially named] (rā + horoi = "washing day")
Neo	Domin; Dominko	Lundo	Tud	Mirko	Jov	Venso	Sab
Romániço	Domínico	Lun-dio	Marti-dio	Mercurii-dio	Jov-dio	Véner-dio	Sábato
Universalglot	diodai	lundai	mardai	erdai	jovdai	vendai	samdai

With the exception of sabato, the Esperanto names are all from French, cf. French dimanche, lundi, mardi, mercredi, jeudi, vendredi.

=== Germanic tradition ===
The Germanic peoples adapted the system introduced by the Romans by substituting the Germanic deities for the Roman ones (with the exception of Saturday) in a process known as interpretatio germanica. The date of the introduction of this system is not known exactly, but it must have happened later than 100 AD but before the introduction of Christianity during the 6th to 7th centuries, i.e., during the final phase or soon after the collapse of the Western Roman Empire. This period is later than the Common Germanic stage, but still during the phase of undifferentiated West Germanic. The names of the days of the week in North Germanic languages were not calqued from Latin directly, but taken from the West Germanic names.

- Sunday: Old English Sunnandæg (pronounced [ˈsunnɑndæj]), meaning "sun's day". This is a translation of the Latin phrase diēs Sōlis. English, like most of the Germanic languages, preserves the day's association with the sun. Many other European languages, including all of the Romance languages, have changed its name to the equivalent of "the Lord's day" (based on Ecclesiastical Latin dies Dominica). In both West Germanic and North Germanic mythology, the Sun is personified as Sunna/Sól.
- Monday: Old English Mōnandæg (pronounced [ˈmoːnɑndæj]), meaning "Moon's day". This is equivalent to the Latin name diēs Lūnae. In North Germanic mythology, the Moon is personified as Máni.
- Tuesday: Old English Tīwesdæg (pronounced [ˈtiːwezdæj]), meaning "Tiw's day". Tiw (Norse Týr) was a one-handed god associated with single combat and pledges in Norse mythology and also attested prominently in wider Germanic paganism. The name of the day is also related to the Latin name diēs Mārtis, "Day of Mars" (the Roman god of war).
- Wednesday: Old English Wōdnesdæg (pronounced [ˈwoːdnezdæj]) meaning the day of the Germanic god Woden (known as Óðinn among the North Germanic peoples), and a prominent god of the Anglo-Saxons (and other Germanic peoples) in England until about the 7th century. This corresponds to the Latin counterpart diēs Mercuriī, "Day of Mercury", as both are deities of magic and knowledge. Importantly, both are also psychopomps, carrying the souls of the dead to the afterlife. The German Mittwoch, the Low German Middeweek, the miðviku- in Icelandic miðvikudagur and the Finnish keskiviikko all mean "mid-week".
- Thursday: Old English Þūnresdæg (pronounced [ˈθuːnrezdæj]), meaning 'Þunor's day'. Þunor means thunder or its personification, the Norse god known in Modern English as Thor. Similarly Dutch donderdag, German Donnerstag ('thunder's day'), Finnish torstai, and Scandinavian torsdag ('Thor's day'). "Thor's day" corresponds to Latin diēs Iovis, "day of Jupiter" (the Roman god of thunder).
- Friday: Old English Frīgedæg (pronounced [ˈfriːjedæj]), meaning the day of the Anglo-Saxon goddess Frīg. The Norse name for the planet Venus was Friggjarstjarna, 'Frigg's star'. It is based on the Latin diēs Veneris, "Day of Venus".
- Saturday: named after the Roman god Saturn associated with the Titan Cronus, father of Zeus and many Olympians. Its original Anglo-Saxon rendering was Sæturnesdæg (pronounced [ˈsæturnezdæj]). In Latin, it was diēs Sāturnī, "Day of Saturn". The Nordic laugardagur, leygardagur, laurdag, etc. deviate significantly as they have no reference to either the Norse or the Roman pantheon; they derive from Old Nordic laugardagr, literally "washing-day". The German Sonnabend (mainly used in northern and eastern Germany) and the Low German Sünnavend mean "Sunday Eve"; the German word Samstag derives from the name for Shabbat.

Day (see Irregularities)	Sunday Sunna	Monday mānō, 'Moon'	Tuesday Tiw	Wednesday: Wōdan; Wōden	Thursday: Donar; Þórr; Þunor	Friday: Frīa; Frīġ	Saturday diēs Sāturnī, 'day of Saturn'
Afrikaans	Sondag	Maandag	Dinsdag (Note: From Thing, a governing assembly in early Germanic society of which god Tyr was the patron.)	Woensdag	Donderdag	Vrydag	Saterdag
Dutch	zondag	maandag	dinsdag	woensdag	donderdag	vrijdag	zaterdag
Old English	sunnandæġ	mōnandæġ	tīwesdæġ	wōdnesdæg	þunresdæġ	frīġedæġ	sæternesdæġ
Old Saxon	sunnundag	*mānundag	*tiuwesdag; *thingesdag	*Wōdanesdag	*thunaresdag	frīadag	*sunnunāƀand (Note: From Sunday eve.); *satarnesdag
Scots	Saubath; Sunday	Monanday	Tysday	Wadensday	Fuirsday	Friday	Seturday
West Frisian	snein	moandei	tiisdei	woansdei	tongersdei	freed	sneon; saterdei

Day (see Irregularities)	Sunday: Sól; Sunna	Monday Máni	Tuesday Týr	Wednesday Óðinn	Thursday Þórr	Friday Frigg	Saturday laug, 'wash'
Danish	søndag	mandag	tirsdag	onsdag	torsdag	fredag	lørdag
Elfdalian	sunndag	mondag	tisdag	ųosdag	tųosdag	frjådag	lovdag
Faroese	sunnudagur	mánadagur	týsdagur	mikudagur; ónsdagur (Suðuroy)	hósdagur; tórsdagur (Suðuroy)	fríggjadagur	leygardagur
Icelandic	sunnudagur	mánudagur	þriðjudagur (Note: From position of the day as "third" in the week.)	miðvikudagur	fimmtudagur (Note: From position of the day as "fifth" in the week.)	föstudagur (Note: From the practice of fasting on this day.)	laugardagur
Norwegian (Bokmål)	søndag	mandag	tirsdag	onsdag	torsdag	fredag	lørdag
Norwegian (Nynorsk)	sundag; søndag	måndag	tysdag	onsdag	torsdag	fredag	laurdag
Old Norse	sunnudagr	mánadagr; mánudagr	týsdagr	óðinsdagr	þórsdagr	frjádagr	laugardagr; sunnunótt
Swedish	söndag	måndag	tisdag	onsdag	torsdag	fredag	lördag

Day (see Irregularities)	Sunday Sunna	Monday Máni	Tuesday Ziu	Wednesday Wōdan	Thursday Donar	Friday Frīa	Saturday Sunday eve
German	Sonntag	Montag	Dienstag; Ziestag (Alemannic German)	Mittwoch; Wodenstag (older)	Donnerstag	Freitag	Samstag; Sonnabend (parts of Eastern Germany)
Low German	Sünndag	Maandag	Dingsdag	Middeweek; Goonsdag; Woonsdag (rare)	Dünnerdag	Freedag	Sünnavend; Saterdag
Luxembourgish	Sonndeg	Méindeg	Dënschdeg	Mëttwoch	Donneschdeg	Freideg	Samschdeg
Middle Low German	Sunnedag	Manedag	Dingesdag	Wodenesdag	Donersdag	Vrīdag	Sunnenavend; Satersdag
North Frisian (Amrum/Föhr)	söndai	mundai	teisdai	wäärnsdei (Amrum); weedensdai (Föhr)	süürsdai (Amrum); tüürsdai (Föhr)	freidai	söninj; söninjer; saninj; saninjer
North Frisian (Halligen)	sondii	mööndii	taisdii	maaderwich	tonersdii	fraidii	soneene
North Frisian (Heligolandic)	Sendai	Mundai	Taisdai	Meddeweeken	Tünnersdai	Fraidai	Senin
North Frisian (Karrharde)	sandäi	moundäi	täisdäi; täiersdäi	weenedai; weenesdai; weensdai	tönersdäi	fräidäi	saneene
North Frisian (Mooring)	saandi	moundi	täisdi	weensdi	törsdi	fraidi	saneene
North Frisian (Northern Goesharde)	saandi (Ockholm); sandi (Langenhorn)	moondi (Ockholm); moundi (Langenhorn)	teesdi (Ockholm); täisdi (Langenhorn)	weensdi (Ockholm); winsdi (Langenhorn)	tünersdi	fraidi	saneene
North Frisian (Sylt)	Sendai	Mondai	Tiisdai	Winjsdai	Türsdai	Friidai	Seninj; Seninjen
North Frisian (Wiedingharde)	sändäi	mundäi; moondai	teedäi; teesdäi; teedäie; teesdäie	wjinsdäi	tördäi; tördäie; türdai; türdaie	fraidäi	sänjin; sänjine
Old High German	sunnūntag	mânetag	ziestag	wuotanestag	donarestag	frīatag; frîjatag; frījetag	sunnûnâband; sunnūnābend; sambaztag
Saterland Frisian	Sundai	Moundai	Täisdai	Middewíek	Tuunsdai	Fräindai	Snäivende; Sneeuwende (Skäddel)
Yiddish	זונטיק, zuntik	מאָנטיק, montik	דינסטיק, dinstik	מיטוואָך, mitvokh	דאָנערשטיק, donershtik	פֿרײַטיק, fraytik	שבת, shabbes

==== Adoptions from Germanic ====
Sami languages have weekday names influenced from neighboring languages, with a majority of weekday names being from Germanic-Norse origin.

Day (see Irregularities)	Sunday: Sól; Sunna; Holy day	Monday: Máni; vuos, 'first'	Tuesday: Týr; maŋŋit, 'second'	Wednesday: keski-, 'middle'; këskë, 'middle'	Thursday Þórr	Friday Frīa	Saturday laug, 'wash'
Finnish	sunnuntai	maanantai	tiistai	keskiviikko	torstai	perjantai	lauantai
Kven	pyhä; sunnuntai	maanantai	tiistai	keskiviikko	tuorestai	perjantai	lauvantai
Meänkieli	pyhä päivä; sunnuntai	maanantai	tiistai	keskiviikko	tuorestai	perjantai	lauantai; lauvantai
South Sami	aejlege	måanta	dæjsta	gaskevåhkoe	duarsta	bearjadahke	laavvardahke; laavadahke; laavvadahke
Ume Sami	ájliege	mánnuodahkka	dïjstahkka	gasskavahkkuo	duarastahkka	bierjjiedahkka; bierjiedahkka	lávvuodahkka
Pite Sami	ájlek	mánnodak	dijstak	gasskavahko	duorasdak	bärrjedak	lávvodak
Lule Sami	ájllek; sådnåbiejvve	mánnodahka	dijstahka	gasskavahkko	duorastahka	bierjjedahka	lávvodahka
North Sami	sotnabeaivi	mánnodat; vuossárga	disdat; maŋŋebárga; disttat	gaskavahkku	duorastat	bearjadat	lávvardat; lávvordat
Inari Sami	pasepeivi	vuossargâ	majebargâ	koskokko	tuorâstâh; turâstâh	vástuppeivi	lávárdâh; lávurdâh
Skolt Sami (for comparison)	pâʹsspeiʹvv	vuõssargg	mââibargg	seärad (Note: From the Russian word среда, sreda, 'Wednesday'.)	neljdpeiʹvv (Note: From position of the day as "fourth" in the week.)	piâtnâc (Note: From the Russian word пятница, pjátnica, 'Friday'.); väʹšnnpeiʹvv; västtpeiʹvv	sueʹvet (Note: From the Russian word суббота, subbóta, 'Saturday'.)

Day (see Irregularities)	Sunday	Monday	Tuesday	Wednesday	Thursday	Friday	Saturday
Māori	wiki (Note: From the English word 'week'.) / Rātapu	Mane / Rāhina	Tūrei / Rātū	Wenerei / Rāapa	Tāite / Rāpare	Paraire / Rāmere	Hāterei / Rāhoroi
Tok Pisin	Sande	Mande	Tunde	Trinde	Fonde	Fraide	Sarere
Volapük	sudel	mudel	tudel	vedel	dödel	fridel	zädel

=== Hindu tradition ===
Hindu astrology uses the concept of days under the regency of a planet under the term vāsara/vāra, the days of the week being called sūrya-/ravi-/āditya, chandra-/soma-, maṅgala-, budha-, guru-/bṛhaspati-, śukra-, and śani-vāsara. śukrá is a name of Venus (regarded as a son of Bhṛgu); guru is here a title of Bṛhaspati, and hence of Jupiter; budha "Mercury" is regarded as a son of Soma, that is, the Moon. Knowledge of Greek astrology existed since about the 2nd century BC, but references to the vāsara occur somewhat later, during the Gupta period (Yājñavalkya Smṛti, c. 3rd to 5th century AD), that is, at roughly the same period or before the system was introduced in the Roman Empire.

==== In languages of the Indian subcontinent ====
	Sunday the Sun (Sūrya, Ravi, Bhānu)	Monday the Moon (Chandra, Indu, Soma)	Tuesday Mars (Mangala)	Wednesday Mercury (Budha)	Thursday Jupiter (Bṛhaspati, Guru)	Friday Venus (Shukra)	Saturday Saturn (Shani)
Angika	𑂉𑂞𑂥𑂰𑂩/𑂩𑂸𑂥; Etbaar/Rôb	𑂮𑂷𑂧𑂰𑂩; Somaar	𑂧𑂁𑂏𑂪; Mangal	𑂥𑂳𑂡; Budh	𑂥𑂹𑂩𑂵𑂮𑂹𑂣𑂞; Brespat	𑂮𑂳𑂍𑂹𑂍𑂳𑂩; Sukkur	𑂮𑂢𑂱𑂒𑂹𑂒𑂩; Sanichchar
Assamese	দেওবাৰ/ৰবিবাৰ; Deübār/Robibār	সোমবাৰ; Xümbār	মঙ্গলবাৰ; Moṅgolbār	বুধবাৰ; Budhbār	বৃহস্পতিবাৰ; Brihoxpotibār	শুক্রবাৰ; Xukrobār	শনিবাৰ; Xonibār
Awadhi	अत्तवार; Attawar	सोम; Som	मंगर; Mangar	बुध; Budh	बीफय; Beefaya	शुक; Shook	शनिच्चर; Shanichchar
Balochi	Cäţţi کاز	Mövlöm موولوم	Sövb سوب	Sakäm سکام	Şikär شکار	Ãđinäk اڈیناک	Gänci گانسی
Balti	Adeed عدید	Tsandar چَندار	Angaru انگارو	Botu بوتو	Brespod بریس پود	Shugoru شوگورو	Shingsher شنگشر
Bengali	রবিবার/রোববার; Rôbibār/Rōbbār	সোমবার; Śōmbār	মঙ্গলবার; Môṅgôlbār	বুধবার; Budhbār	বৃহস্পতিবার/বিষ্যুদবার; Br̥hôspôtibār/Biṣyudbār	শুক্রবার/জুম্মাবার; Śukrôbār/Jummābār (Note: From the Arabic جمعة, jumuʕa, 'to gather', associated with Muslim Friday prayers.)	শনিবার; Śônibār
Bhojpuri	एतवार; Aitwār	सोमार; Somār	मंगर; Mangar	बुध; Budh	बियफे Bi'phey	सुक्क; Sukk	सनिच्चर; Sanichchar
Burushaski	Adit اَدِت	Tsandurah ژَندُرَہ	Angāro اَنگارو	Bodo بودو	Birēspat بِریسپَت	Shukro شُکرو	Shimshēr شِمشیر
Chitrali (Khowar)	Yakshambey یک شمبے	Doshambey دو شمبے (Note: From the Persian پیر, pīr, 'elder', related to deference for the birth of Muhammad.)	Seshambey سہ شمبے	Charshambey چار شمبے	Pachambey پچھمبے	Adina آدینہ (Note: From the Persian word آدینه, ādine, associated with Muslim Friday prayer.)	Shambey شمبے
Gujarati	રવિવાર; Ravivār	સોમવાર; Somvār	મંગળવાર; Mangaḷvār	બુધવાર; Budhvār	ગુરૂવાર; Guruvār	શુક્રવાર; Shukravār	શનિવાર; Shanivār
Hindi	रविवार/सूर्यवार; Ravivār/Sūryavār	सोमवार/चन्द्रवार; Somvār/Chandravār	मंगलवार; Mangalvār	बुधवार; Budhavār	गुरुवार; Guruvār	शुक्रवार; Shukravār	शनिवार; Shanivār
Hindko	Atwaar اتوار	Suwar سؤ وار	Mungal منگل	Bud بدھ	Jumiraat جمعرات	Jummah جمعہ	Khali خالي
Hmar	Pathienni	Thawṭanni	Thawleni	Nilaini	Ningani	Zirtawpni	Inrinni
Kannada	ಭಾನುವಾರ; Bhanu Vaara	ಸೋಮವಾರ; Soma Vaara	ಮಂಗಳವಾರ; Mangala Vaara	ಬುಧವಾರ; Budha Vaara	ಗುರುವಾರ; Guru Vaara	ಶುಕ್ರವಾರ; Shukra Vaara	ಶನಿವಾರ; Shani Vaara
Kashmiri	آتھوار /aːtʰwaːr/	ژٔنٛدرٕوار /t͡səndrɨwaːr/	بوموار/ بۄنٛوار /boːmwaːr/ or /bɔ̃waːr/	بۄدوار /bɔdwaːr/	برَٛسوار/ برٛؠسوار /braswaːr/ or /brʲaswaːr/	شۆکُروار/ جُمعہ /ʃokurwaːr/ or /jumaːh/	بَٹہٕ وار /baʈɨwaːr/
Konkani	आयतार; Āytār	सोमार; Somaar	मंगळार; Mangaḷār	बुधवार; Budhavār	भीरेस्तार; Bhirestār	शुक्रार; Shukrār	शेनवार; Shenvār
Maithili	𑒩𑒫𑒱𑒠𑒱𑒢; Ravidin	𑒮𑒼𑒧𑒠𑒱𑒢; Somdin	𑒧𑓀𑒑𑒪𑒠𑒱𑒢; Maṅgaldin	𑒥𑒳𑒡𑒠𑒱𑒢; Budhdin	𑒥𑒵𑒯𑒮𑓂𑒣𑒞𑒲𑒠𑒱𑒢; Brihaspatidin	𑒬𑒳𑒏𑓂𑒩𑒠𑒱𑒢; Śukradin	𑒬𑒢𑒲𑒠𑒱𑒢; Śanidin
Malayalam	ഞായര്‍ Nhāyar	തിങ്കള്‍ Tingal	ചൊവ്വ; Chovva	ബുധന്‍ Budhan	വ്യാഴം Vyāzham	വെള്ളി Velli	ശനി Shani
Maldivian	އާދީއްތަ Aadheeththa	ހޯމަ Hoama	އަންގާރަ Angaara	ބުދަ Budha	ބުރާސްފަތި Buraasfathi	ހުކުރު Hukuru	ހޮނިހިރު Honihiru
Marathi	रविवार; Ravivār	सोमवार; Somavār	मंगळवार; Mangaḷavār	बुधवार; Budhavār	गुरूवार; Guruvār	शुक्रवार; Shukravār	शनिवार; Shanivār
Nepali	आइतवार; Aaitabar	सोमवार; Sombar	मंगलवार; Mangalbar	बुधवार; Budhabar	बिहिवार; Bihibar	शुक्रवार; Sukrabar	शनिवार; Sanibar
Odia	ରବିବାର; Rabibāra	ସୋମବାର; Somabāra	ମଙ୍ଗଳବାର; Maṅgaḷabāra	ବୁଧବାର; Budhabāra	ଗୁରୁବାର; Gurubāra	ଶୁକ୍ରବାର; Sukrabāra	ଶନିବାର; Sanibāra
Pashto	Etwar يونۍ	Gul دوه نۍ	Nehi درېنۍ	Shoro څلرنۍ	Ziarat پنځه نۍ	Jumma جمعه	Khali پيلنۍ
Punjabi (Gurmukhi)	ਐਤਵਾਰ; Aitvār	ਸੋਮਵਾਰ; Sōmvār	ਮੰਗਲਵਾਰ; Mangalvār	ਬੁੱਧਵਾਰ; Buddhvār	ਵੀਰਵਾਰ; Vīrvār	ਸ਼ੁੱਕਰਵਾਰ; Shukkarvār or ਜੁਮਾ Jumā	ਸ਼ਨਿੱਚਰਵਾਰ; Shaniccharvār or ਸ਼ਨੀਵਾਰ; Shanīvār or ਸਨਿੱਚਰਵਾਰ; Saniccharvār or ਸਨੀਵਾਰ; Sanīvār
Punjabi (Shahmukhi)	Aitwār ایتوار	Somvār سوموار	Mangalvār منگلوار	Buddhvār بدھوار	Vīr vār ویر وار	Jumāh جمعہ or Shukkarvār شکروار	Hafta ہفتہ or Chanicchar چھنچھر or Chaniccharvār چھنچھروار
Rohingya	rooibar	cómbar	mongolbar	buidbar	bicíbbar	cúkkurbar	cónibar
Santali	ᱥᱤᱸᱜᱮ ᱢᱟᱦᱟᱸ sim̐ge māhām̐	ᱚᱛᱮ ᱢᱟᱦᱟᱸ ate māhām̐	ᱵᱟᱞᱮ ᱢᱟᱦᱟᱸ bāle māhām̐	ᱥᱟᱹᱜᱩᱱ ᱢᱟᱦᱟᱸ sôgun māhām̐	ᱥᱟᱹᱨᱫᱤ ᱢᱟᱦᱟᱸ sôrdi māhām̐	ᱡᱟᱹᱨᱩᱢ ᱢᱟᱦᱟᱸ jôrum māhām̐	ᱧᱩᱦᱩᱢ ᱢᱟᱦᱟᱸ ñuhum māhām̐
Sanskrit	भानुवासर; Bhānuvāsara	इन्दुवासर; Induvāsara	भौमवासर; Bhaumavāsara	सौम्यवासर; Saumyavāsara	गुरुवासर; Guruvāsara	भृगुवासर; Bhṛguvāsara	स्थिरवासर; Sthiravāsara
Saurashtra	Aitār	Somār	Monglār	Budhār	Bestār	Sukrār	Senmār
Shina	Adit ادیت	Tsunduro تساند ورؤ	Ungaro نگارو	Budo بوڈو	Brespat بیرے سپاٹ	Shukur شوکر	Shimsher شیم شےر
Sindhi	Ācharu آچَرُ or Ārtvāru آرتوارُ	Sūmaru سُومَرُ	Angāro اَنڱارو or Mangalu مَنگلُ	Arbā اَربع or Budharu ٻُڌَرُ	Khamīsa خَميِسَ or Vispati وِسپَتِ	Jum'o جُمعو or Shukru شُڪرُ	Chancharu ڇَنڇَرُ or Śanscharu شَنسچَرُ
Sinhala	ඉරිදා Irida	සඳුදා Sanduda	අඟහරුවාදා Angaharuwada	බදාදා Badada	බ්‍රහස්පතින්දා Brahaspathinda	සිකුරාදා Sikurada	සෙනසුරාදා Senasurada
Tamil	ஞாயிறு Ñāyiṟu	திங்கள் Tiṅkaḷ	செவ்வாய் Cevvāy	புதன் Putaṉ	வியாழன் Viyāḻaṉ	வெள்ளி Veḷḷi	சனி Caṉi
Telugu	ఆదివారం Aadi Vāram	సోమవారం Soma Vāram	మంగళవారం Mangala Vāram	బుధవారం Budha Vāram	గురువారం Guru Vāram	శుక్రవారం Sukra Vāram	శనివారం Sani Vāram
Urdu	Itwār اتوار	Pīr پیر	Mangal منگل	Budh بدھ	Jumerāt جمعرات	Jum'ah جمعہ	Haftah ہفتہ (Note: From the Persian word هفته, hafte, 'week'.)

==== Southeast Asian languages ====
The Southeast Asian tradition also uses the Hindu names of the days of the week. Hindu astrology adopted the concept of days under the regency of a planet under the term vāra, the days of the week being called āditya-, soma-, maṅgala-, budha-, guru-, śukra-, and śani-vāra. śukrá is a name of Venus (regarded as a son of Bhṛgu); guru is here a title of Bṛhaspati, and hence of Jupiter; budha "Mercury" is regarded as a son of Soma, that is, the Moon.

	Sunday the Sun (Aditya, Ravi)	Monday the Moon (Soma, Chandra, Indu)	Tuesday Mars (Mangala, Angaraka)	Wednesday Mercury (Budha)	Thursday Jupiter (Bṛhaspati, Guru)	Friday Venus (Shukra)	Saturday Saturn (Shani)
Burmese	တနင်္ဂနွေ (Note: From an Old Burmese word, not of Indic origin.); IPA: [tənɪ̀ɰ̃ ɡənwè] (ta.nangga.new)	တနင်္လာ IPA: [tənɪ̀ɰ̃ là] (ta.nangla)	အင်္ဂါ IPA: [ɪ̀ɰ̃ ɡà] (Angga)	ဗုဒ္ဓဟူး IPA: [boʊʔ dəhú] (Buddhahu) (afternoon=new day) ရာဟု Rahu	ကြာသာပတေး IPA: [tɕà ðà bədé] (Krasapate)	သောကြာ IPA: [θaʊʔ tɕà] (Saukra)	စနေ IPA: [sənè] (Cane)
Mon	တ္ၚဲ အဒိုတ် [ŋoa ətɜ̀t] from Sans. āditya	တ္ၚဲ စန် [ŋoa cɔn] from Sans. candra	တ္ၚဲ အၚါ [ŋoa əŋɛ̀a] from Sans. aṅgāra	တ္ၚဲ ဗုဒ္ဓဝါ [ŋoa pùt-həwɛ̀a] from Sans. budhavāra	တ္ၚဲ ဗြဴဗ္တိ [ŋoa pɹɛ̀apətɔeʔ] from Sans. bṛhaspati	တ္ၚဲ သိုက်. [ŋoa sak] from Sans. śukra	တ္ၚဲ သ္ၚိ သဝ် [ŋoa hɔeʔ sɔ] from Sans. śani
Khmer	ថ្ងៃអាទិត្យ [tŋaj ʔaːtɨt]	ថ្ងៃចន្ទ [tŋaj can]	ថ្ងៃអង្គារ [tŋaj ʔɑŋkiə]	ថ្ងៃពុធ [tŋaj put]	ថ្ងៃព្រហស្បត្ណិ [tŋaj prɔhoə̯h]	ថ្ងៃសុក្រ [tŋaj sok]	ថ្ងៃសៅរ៍ [tŋaj saʋ]
Lao	ວັນອາທິດ [wán ʔàːtʰīt]	ວັນຈັນ [wán càn]	ວັນອັງຄານ [wán ʔàŋkʰáːn]	ວັນພຸດ [wán pʰūt]	ວັນພະຫັດ [wán pʰāhát]	ວັນສຸກ [wán súk]	ວັນເສົາ [wán sǎu]
Cham	Adit	Thôm	Angar	But	jip	Suk	Thanưchăn
Shan	ဝၼ်းဢႃတိတ်ႉ IPA: [wan˦ ʔaː˩ tit˥]	ဝၼ်းၸၼ် IPA: [wan˦ tsan˩]	ဝၼ်းဢင်းၵၼ်း IPA: [wan˦ ʔaŋ˦ kan˦]	ဝၼ်းၽုတ်ႉ IPA: [wan˦ pʰut˥]	ဝၼ်းၽတ်း IPA: [wan˦ pʰat˦]	ဝၼ်းသုၵ်း IPA: [wan˦ sʰuk˦]	ဝၼ်းသဝ် IPA: [wan˦ sʰaw˩]
Thai	วันอาทิตย์ Wan Āthit	วันจันทร์ Wan Chan	วันอังคาร; Wan Angkhān	วันพุธ; Wan Phut	วันพฤหัสบดี Wan Phruehatsabodi	วันศุกร์ Wan Suk	วันเสาร์ Wan Sao
Javanese	ꦫꦢꦶꦠꦾ Raditya	ꦱꦺꦴꦩ; Soma	ꦲꦁꦒꦫ; Anggara	ꦧꦸꦢ; Buda	ꦉꦱ꧀ꦥꦠꦶ Respati	ꦱꦸꦏꦿ Sukra	ꦠꦸꦩ꧀ꦥꦼꦏ꧀ Tumpek
Balinese	ᬋᬤᬶᬢᬾ Redité	ᬲᭀᬫ; Soma	ᬳᬂᬕᬭ; Anggara	ᬩᬸᬤ; Buda	ᬯᬺᬲ᭄ᬧᬢᬶ Wrespati	ᬲᬸᬓ᭄ᬭ; Sukra	ᬲᬦᬶᬲ᭄ᬘᬭ; Saniscara
Sundanese	ᮛᮓᮤᮒᮦ Radité	ᮞᮧᮙ; Soma	ᮃᮀᮌᮛ; Anggara	ᮘᮥᮓ; Buda	ᮛᮨᮞ᮪ᮕᮒᮤ Respati	ᮞᮥᮊᮢ Sukra	ᮒᮥᮙ᮪ᮕᮨᮊ᮪ Tumpek
Toba Batak	Artia	Suma	Anggara	Muda	Boraspati	Singkora	Samisara
Angkola-Mandailing Batak	Arita	Suma	Anggara	Muda	Boraspati	Sikkora	Samisara
Simalungun Batak	Aditia	Suma	Anggara	Mudaha	Boraspati	Sihora	Samisara
Karo Batak	Aditia	Suma	Nggara	Budaha	Beraspati	Cukra	Belah Naik
Pakpak Batak	Antia	Suma	Anggara	Budaha/Muda	Beraspati	Cukerra	Belah Naik

==== Northeast Asian languages ====
	Sunday the Sun (Aditya, Ravi)	Monday the Moon (Soma, Chandra, Indu)	Tuesday Mars (Mangala, Angāraka)	Wednesday Mercury (Budha)	Thursday Jupiter (Bṛhaspati, Guru)	Friday Venus (Shukra)	Saturday Saturn (Shani)
Mongolian	адъяа, ad'yaa	сумъяа, sum'yaa	ангараг, angarag	буд, bud	бархабадь, barhabad'	сугар, sugar	санчир, sanchir
Kalmyk	адъян өдр, ad'yan ödr	сумъян өдр, sum'yan ödr	мингъян өдр, ming'yan ödr	будан өдр, budan ödr	гуръян өдр, gur'yan ödr	шикрян өдр, shikr'yan ödr	шанун өдр, shanun ödr

=== East Asian tradition ===
The East Asian naming system for the days of the week closely parallels that of the Latin system and is ordered after the "Seven Luminaries" (七曜 qī yào), which consists of the Sun, Moon and the five classical planets visible to the naked eye.

The Chinese had apparently adopted the seven-day week from the Hellenistic system by the 4th century AD, although by which route is not entirely clear. It was again transmitted to China in the 8th century AD by Manichaeans, via the country of Kang (a Central Asian polity near Samarkand). The 4th century AD date, according to the Cihai encyclopedia, is due to a reference to Fan Ning (范寧), an astrologer of the Jin dynasty. The renewed adoption from Manichaeans in the 8th century AD (Tang dynasty) is documented with the writings of the Chinese Buddhist monk Yijing and the Ceylonese Buddhist monk Bu Kong.

The Chinese transliteration of the planetary system was soon brought to Japan by the Japanese monk Kobo Daishi; surviving diaries of the Japanese statesman Fujiwara no Michinaga show the seven-day system in use in Heian period Japan as early as 1007. In Japan, the seven-day system was kept in use (for astrological purposes) until its promotion to a full-fledged (Western-style) calendrical basis during the Meiji era. In China, with the founding of the Republic of China in 1911, Monday through Saturday in China are now named by their numbers, with Monday as "weekday 1" and Saturday as "weekday 6".

Pronunciations for Classical Chinese names are given in Standard Chinese.

	Sunday	Monday	Tuesday	Wednesday	Thursday	Friday	Saturday
Celestial Object	Sun (日); First Star – Yang (太陽)	Moon (月); Second Star – Yin (太陰)	Mars (火星); Third Star – Fire (熒惑)	Mercury (水星); Fourth Star – Water (辰星)	Jupiter (木星); Fifth Star – Wood (歲星)	Venus (金星); Sixth Star – Metal or Gold (太白)	Saturn (土星); Seventh Star – Earth or Soil (鎮星)
Classical Chinese	日曜日, Hanyu pinyin: rìyàorì	月曜日, Hanyu Pinyin: yuèyàorì	火曜日, Hanyu Pinyin: huǒyàorì	水曜日, Hanyu Pinyin: shuǐyàorì	木曜日, Hanyu Pinyin: mùyàorì	金曜日, Hanyu Pinyin: jīnyàorì	土曜日, Hanyu Pinyin: tǔyàorì
Japanese	日曜日, nichiyōbi	月曜日, getsuyōbi	火曜日, kayōbi	水曜日, suiyōbi	木曜日, mokuyōbi	金曜日, kin'yōbi	土曜日, doyōbi
Korean	일요일, (Hanja:) 日曜日, iryoil	월요일, (Hanja:) 月曜日, woryoil	화요일, (Hanja:) 火曜日, hwayoil	수요일, (Hanja:) 水曜日, suyoil	목요일, (Hanja:) 木曜日, mogyoil	금요일, (Hanja:) 金曜日, geumyoil	토요일, (Hanja:) 土曜日, toyoil
Mongolian	наран өдөр, naraŋ ödör	саран өдөр, saraŋ ödör	гал өдөр, gal ödör	усан өдөр, usaŋ ödör	модон өдөр, modoŋ ödör	төмөр өдөр, tömör ödör; алтан өдөр, altaŋ ödör	шороон өдөр, shorooŋ ödör
Mongolian (Transliteration from Tibetan)	ням, nyam	даваа, davaa	мягмар, myagmar	лхагва, lhagva	пүрэв, pürev	баасан, baasan	бямба, byamba
Tibetan	གཟའ་ཉི་མ།, gza' nyi ma, Nyima	གཟའ་ཟླ་བ།, gza' zla wa, Dawa	གཟའ་མིག་དམར།, gza' mig dmar, Mikmar	གཟའ་ལྷག་པ།, gza' lhak pa, Lhakpa	གཟའ་ཕུར་བུ།, gza' phur bu, Purbu	གཟའ་པ་སངས།, gza' pa sangs, Pasang	གཟའ་སྤེན་པ།, gza' spen ba, Penba

== Numbered days of the week ==
=== Days numbered from Monday ===
ISO prescribes Monday as the first day of the week with ISO-8601 for software date formats.

The Slavic, Baltic and Uralic languages (except Finnish and partially Estonian and Võro) adopted numbering but took Monday rather than Sunday as the "first day". This convention is also found in some Austronesian languages whose speakers were converted to Christianity by European missionaries.

In Slavic languages, some of the names correspond to numerals after Sunday: compare Russian vtornik (вторник) "Tuesday" and vtoroj (второй) "the second", chetverg (четверг) "Thursday" and chetvjortyj (четвёртый) "the fourth", pyatnitsa (пятница) "Friday" and pyatyj (пятый) "the fifth"; see also the notes regarding irregularities.

Day Number From One	Monday Day One	Tuesday Day Two	Wednesday Day Three	Thursday Day Four	Friday Day Five	Saturday Day Six	Sunday Day Seven
ISO 8601	1	2	3	4	5	6	7
Russian	понедельник, ponedel'nik (Note: Following the non-working day.)	вторник, vtornik	среда, sreda	четверг, chetverg	пятница, pyatnitsa	суббота, subbota	воскресенье, voskresen'ye (Note: From Resurrection of Jesus, associated with Christian Divine Liturgy.)
Belarusian	панядзелак, panyadzelak	аўторак, awtorak	серада, serada	чацвер, chats'ver	пятніца, pyatnitsa	субота, subota	нядзеля, nyadzelya (Note: From the practice of not working on this day.)
Ukrainian	понедiлок, ponedilok	вівторок, vivtorok	середа, sereda	четвер, chetver	п'ятниця, p'yatnytsya	субота, subota	неділя, nedilya
Lemko Rusyn	понедільок, ponedilyok	віторок, vitorok	середа, sereda	четвер, chetver	пятниця, pyatnîtsya	субота, subota	неділя, nedilya
Prešov Rusyn	понедїлёк, ponedyilyok	вівторок, vivtorok	середа, sereda	четверь, chetver'	пятніця, pyatnitsya	субота, subota	недїля, nedyilya
Pannonian Rusyn	пондзелок, pondzelok	вовторок, vovtorok	стреда, streda	штварток, shtvartok	пияток, piyatok	собота, sobota	нєдзеля, nyedzelya
Slovak	pondelok	utorok	streda	štvrtok	piatok	sobota	nedeľa
Czech	pondělí	úterý	středa	čtvrtek	pátek	sobota	neděle
Upper Sorbian	póndźela	wutora	srjeda	štwórtk	pjatk	sobota	njedźela
Lower Sorbian	pónjeźele	wałtora	srjoda	stwórtk	pětk	sobota	njeźela
Polish	poniedziałek	wtorek	środa	czwartek	piątek	sobota	niedziela
Kashubian	pòniedzôłk	wtórk	strzoda	czwiôrtk	piątk	sobòta	niedzela
Slovene	ponedeljek	torek	sreda	četrtek	petek	sobota	nedelja
Burgenland Croatian	pandiljak, ponediljak	utorak	srijeda	četvrtak	petak	subota	nedilja
Bosnian/Croatian/Montenegrin/Serbian	понедјељак, ponedjeljak (Ijekavian); понедељак, ponedeljak (Ekavian)	уторак, utorak	сриједа, srijeda (Ijekavian); среда, sreda (Ekavian)	четвртак, četvrtak	петак, petak	субота, subota	недјеља, nedjelja (Ijekavian); недеља, nedelja (Ekavian)
Macedonian	понеделник, ponedelnik	вторник, vtornik	среда, sreda	четврток, chetvrtok	петок, petok	сабота, sabota	недела, nedela
Bulgarian	понеделник, ponedélnik	вторник, vtórnik	сряда, srjáda	четвъртък, četvǎ́rtǎk	петък, pétǎk	събота, sǎ́bota	неделя, nedélja
Interslavic	понедєлок, ponedělok	второк, vtorok	срєда, srěda	четврток, četvrtok	петок, petok	субота, subota	недєлја, nedělja
Lithuanian	pirmadiẽnis	antrãdienis	trečiãdienis	ketvirtãdienis	penktãdienis	šeštãdienis	sekmãdienis
Latvian	pirmdiena	otrdiena	trešdiena	ceturtdiena	piektdiena	sestdiena	svētdiena
Hungarian	hétfő (Note: From "head", as the day is considered to start the week.)	kedd (Note: From position of the day as "second" in the week.)	szerda	csütörtök	péntek	szombat	vasárnap (Note: From the practice of holding markets on this day.)
Estonian	esmaspäev	teisipäev	kolmapäev	neljapäev	reede (Note: From Frīa, borrowed from Germanic languages.)	laupäev (Note: From practice of washing or bathing on this day.)	pühapäev (Note: From the practice of considering this day sacred.)
Võro	iispäiv	tõõsõpäiv	kolmapäiv	neläpäiv	riidi	puul'päiv (Note: From the practice of working only half of the day.)	pühäpäiv
Mongolian (numerical)	нэг дэх өдөр, neg dekh ödör	хоёр дахь өдөр, hoyor dahi ödör	гурав дахь өдөр, gurav dahi ödör	дөрөв дэх өдөр, döröv dekh ödör	тав дахь өдөр, tav dahi ödör	хагас сайн өдөр, hagas sayn ödör (Note: From "half good".)	бүхэн сайн өдөр, büten sayn ödör (Note: From "whole good".)
Southern Luo (Dholuo)	Wuok tich	Tich ariyo	Tich adek	Tich ang'uen	Tich abich	Chieng' ngeso	Juma pil
Hawaiian	Pōʻakahi	Pōʻalua	Pōʻakolu	Pōʻahā	Pōʻalima	Pōʻaono	Lāpule (Note: From the practice of praying on this day.)
Māori (variant)	Rātahi	Rārua	Rātoru	Rāwhā	Rārima	Rāhoroi [not ordinally named, see above]	Rātapu [not ordinally named, see above]
Apma	ren bwaleh; mande	ren karu	ren katsil	ren kavet	ren kalim	lesaare	sande
Sona	enyodi	doyodi	tinyodi	cayodi	penyodi	xiodi	zunyodi
Yakut	бэнидиэнньик, benidiennyik	оптуорунньук, optuorunnyuk	сэрэдэ, serede	чэппиэр, çeppier	бээтинсэ, beetinse	субуота, subuota	баскыһыанньа, baskıhıannya

A number of Bantu languages have days numbered from Monday as an influence from Western missionaries. They brought along with them working days, e.g. in Setswana: Labobedi (the second working day – Tuesday), Laboraro (the third working day), Labone (the fourth working day), Labotlhano (the fifth working day). Sunday became known as the day of going to church when the iron (tshipi) bell rings, thus Latshipi.

A rare Māori Friday synonym to Rārima (as well as Rāpare) was Rāoka meaning "killing day" (te rā oka) said to come from the practice of missionaries slaughtering pigs on that day for the carcasses to be butchered the next Saturday and given away before Sunday.

In Standard Chinese, the week is referred to as the "Stellar period" (Chinese: 星期; pinyin: Xīngqī) or "Cycle" (simplified Chinese: 周; traditional Chinese: 週; pinyin: Zhōu).

The modern Chinese names for the days of the week are based on a simple numerical sequence. The word for "week" is followed by a number indicating the day: "Monday" is literally the "Stellar Period One"/"Cycle One", that is, the "First day of the Stellar Period/Cycle", etc. The exception is Sunday, where 日 (rì), "day" or "Sun", is used instead of a number. A slightly informal and colloquial variant to 日 is 天 (tiān) "day", "sky" or "heaven". However, the term 週天 is rarely used compared to 星期天. Accordingly, the notational abbreviation of the days of the week uses the numbers, for example, 一 for "M" or "Mon(.)", "Monday". The abbreviation of Sunday uses exclusively 日 and not 天. Attempted usage of 天 as such will not be understood.

Colloquially, the week is also known as the "Worship" (simplified Chinese: 礼拜; traditional Chinese: 禮拜; pinyin: Lǐbài), with the names of the days of the week formed accordingly. This is also dominant in certain regional varieties of Chinese.

The following is a table of the Mandarin names of the days of the weeks. Note that standard Taiwan Mandarin pronounces 期 as qí, so 星期 is instead xīngqí. While all varieties of Mandarin may pronounce 星期 as xīngqi and 禮拜/礼拜 as lǐbai, the second syllable with the neutral tone, this is not reflected in the table either for legibility.

Day (Romanizations using Hanyu Pinyin)	Monday 一, yī, 'one'	Tuesday 二, èr, 'two'	Wednesday 三, sān, 'three'	Thursday 四, sì, 'four'	Friday 五, wǔ, 'five'	Saturday 六, liù, 'six'	Sunday 日, rì, 'day' or 天, tiān, 'sky'
Standard Modern Chinese	星期一, xīngqīyī; 週一, zhōuyī; 禮拜一, lǐbàiyī	星期二, xīngqī'èr; 週二, zhōu'èr; 禮拜二, lǐbài'èr	星期三, xīngqīsān; 週三, zhōusān; 禮拜三, lǐbàisān	星期四, xīngqīsì; 週四, zhōusì; 禮拜四, lǐbàisì	星期五, xīngqīwǔ; 週五, zhōuwǔ; 禮拜五, lǐbàiwǔ	星期六, xīngqīliù; 週六, zhōuliù; 禮拜六, lǐbàiliù	星期日, xīngqīrì; 星期天, xīngqītiān; 週日, zhōurì; 週天, zhōutiān (rare); 禮拜天, lǐbàitiān; 禮拜日, lǐbàirì

Several Sinitic languages refer to Saturday as 週末 "end of the week" and Sunday as 禮拜. Examples include Shenyang Mandarin, Hanyuan Sichuanese Mandarin, Taishanese, Yudu Hakka, Teochew, Ningbonese, and Loudi Old Xiang. Some Hakka varieties in Taiwan still use the traditional Luminaries.

=== Days numbered from Sunday ===
Sunday comes first in order in calendars shown in the table below. In the Abrahamic tradition, the first day of the week is Sunday. Biblical Sabbath (corresponding to Saturday) is when God rested from six-day Creation, making the day following the Sabbath the first day of the week (corresponding to Sunday). Seventh-day Sabbaths were sanctified for celebration and rest. After the week was adopted in early Christianity, Sunday remained the first day of the week, but also gradually displaced Saturday as the day of celebration and rest, being considered the Lord's Day.

Saint Martin of Dumio (c. 520–580), archbishop of Braga, decided not to call days by pagan gods and to use ecclesiastic terminology to designate them. While the custom of numbering the days of the week was mostly prevalent in the Eastern Church, Portuguese and Mirandese, due to Martin's influence, are the only Romance languages in which the names of the days come from numbers rather than planetary names.

Members of the Religious Society of Friends (Quakers) historically objected to the pagan etymologies of days and months and substituted numbering, beginning with First Day for Sunday.

Day Number from One	Sunday (Day One)	Monday (Day Two)	Tuesday (Day Three)	Wednesday (Day Four)	Thursday (Day Five)	Friday (Day Six)	Saturday (Day Seven)
Hebrew	יום ראשון yom rishon	יום שני yom sheni	יום שלישי yom shlishi	יום רביעי yom revi'i	יום חמישי yom ħamishi	יום שישי yom shishi	שבת; Shabbat
Ecclesiastical Latin	Dominica (Note: From the Latin diēs Dominicus or Greek Κυριακή, Kyriakí), meaning Lord's Day.)	feria secunda	feria tertia	feria quarta	feria quinta	feria sexta	sabbatum
Portuguese	domingo	segunda-feira	terça-feira	quarta-feira	quinta-feira	sexta-feira	sábado
Galician	domingo	segunda feira	terza feira terceira feira	corta feira cuarta feira quarta-feira	quinta feira	sexta feira	sábado
Mirandese	demingo deimingo	segunda-feira	terça-feira	quarta-feira	quinta-feira	sesta-feira	sábado
Tetum	loron-domingu	loron-segunda	loron-tersa	loron-kuarta	loron-kinta	loron-sesta	loron-sábadu
Greek	Κυριακή; Kyriakí	Δευτέρα; Deftéra	Τρίτη; Tríti	Τετάρτη; Tetárti	Πέμπτη; Pémpti	Παρασκευή; Paraskeví (Note: From the practice of preparing for religious rites on this day.)	Σάββατο; Sávato
Georgian	კვირა k'vira	ორშაბათი oršabati	სამშაბათი samšabati	ოთხშაბათი otxšabati	ხუთშაბათი xutšabati	პარასკევი p'arask'evi	შაბათი šabati
Western Armenian	Կիրակի; Giragi	Երկուշաբթի; Yergushapti	Երեքշաբթի; Yerekshapti	Չորեքշաբթի; Chorekshapti	Հինգշաբթի; Hinkshapti	Ուրբաթ; Urpat	Շաբաթ; Shapat
Eastern Armenian	կիրակի kiraki	երկուշաբթի yerkushapʰtʰi	երեքշաբթի yerekʰshapʰtʰi	չորեքշաբթի chʰorekʰshapʰtʰi	հինգշաբթի hingshapʰtʰi	ուրբաթ urpʰatʰ	շաբաթ shapʰatʰ
Vietnamese	chủ nhật Chúa nhật	thứ hai	thứ ba	thứ tư	thứ năm	thứ sáu	thứ bảy
Somali	𐒖𐒄𐒖𐒆; Axad	𐒘𐒈𐒒𐒕𐒒; Isniin	𐒂𐒖𐒐𐒛𐒆𐒙; Talaado	𐒖𐒇𐒁𐒖𐒋𐒙; Arbaco	𐒅𐒖𐒑𐒕𐒈; Khamiis	𐒃𐒘𐒑𐒋𐒙; Jimco	𐒈𐒖𐒁𐒂𐒘; Sabti
Amharic	እሑድ əhud	ሰኞ säñño	ማክሰኞ maksäñño	ረቡዕ räbu, ሮብ rob	ሐሙስ hamus	ዓርብ arb	ቅዳሜ ḳədame
Arabic	الأَحَد al-aḥad	الإثنين al-ithnayn	الثُّلَاثاء ath-thulāthā’	الأَرْبعاء al-arbi‘ā’	الخَمِيسُ al-khamīs	الجُمُعَة al-jumu‘ah (also الجُمْعَة al-jum‘ah )	السَّبْت as-sabt
Maltese	il-Ħadd	it-Tnejn	it-Tlieta	l-Erbgħa	il-Ħamis	il-Ġimgħa	is-Sibt
Malay (incl. Indonesian and Malaysian)	Ahad or Minggu	Isnin or Senin	Selasa	Rabu	K(h)amis	Juma(a)t	Sabtu
Javanese	Ngahad, Ngakad, Minggu	Senèn	Selasa	Rebo	Kemis	Jemuwah	Setu
Sundanese	Minggu / Minggon	Senén	Salasa	Rebo	Kemis	Jumaah	Saptu
Persian	یکشنبه yekšanbe	دوشنبه došanbe	سه‌شنبه sešanbe	چهارشنبه čāhāršanbe	پنجشنبه panjšanbe	آدینه or جمعه ādine or djom'e	شنبه šanbe
Kazakh	Жексенбі Jeksenbı	Дүйсенбі Düisenbı	Сейсенбі Seisenbı	Сәрсенбі Särsenbı	Бейсенбі Beisenbı	Жұма Jūma	Сенбі Senbı
Karakalpak	Ekshembi yekşembı	Dúyshembi düişembı	Siyshembi sişembı	Sárshembi särşembı	Piyshembi pişembı	Jumа jūma	Shembі şembı
Tatar	Якшәмбе yakşämbe	Дүшәмбе düşämbe	Сишәмбе sişämbe	Чәршәмбе çärşämbe	Пәнҗешәмбе pänceşämbe	Җомга comga	Шимбә şimbä
Khowar	یک شمبے yak shambey	دو شمبے du shambey	سہ شمبے sey shambey	چار شمبے char shambey	پچھمبے pachhambey	آدینہ adina	شمبے shambey
Kurdish	Yekşem	Duşem	Sêşem	Çarşem	Pêncşem	În	Şemî
Uyghur	يەكشەنبە, yekshenbe	دۈشەنبە, düshenbe	سەيشەنبە, seyshenbe	چارشەنبە, charshenbe	پەيشەنبە, peyshenbey	جۈمە, jüme	شەنبە, shenbe
Old Turkic	birinç kün	ikinç kün	üçünç kün	törtinç kün	beşinç kün	altınç kün	yetinç kün
Turkish	Pazar	Pazartesi (Note: From the practice of holding markets on the previous day.)	Salı (Note: derived from Arabic: ثالث, romanized: ṯāliṯ, lit. 'third')	Çarşamba (Note: çehar-şenbe (derived from Persian))	Perşembe (Note: penc-şenbih (derived from Persian))	Cuma	Cumartesi (Note: From the practice of holding Muslim Friday prayers on the previous day.)
Azerbaijani	Bazar	Bazar ertəsi	Çərşənbə axşamı	Çərşənbə	Cümə axşamı	Cümə	Şənbə
Uzbek	Yakshanba	Dushanba	Seshanba	Chorshanba	Payshanba	Juma	Shanba
Navajo	Damóo/Damíigo	Damóo Biiskání	Damóo dóó Naakiską́o	Damóo dóó Tááʼ Yiską́o	Damóo dóó Dį́į́ʼ Yiską́o	Ndaʼiiníísh	Yiską́o Damóo

=== Days numbered from Saturday ===
In Swahili, the day begins at sunrise, unlike in the Arabic and Hebrew calendars where the day starts at sunset (therefore an offset of twelve hours on average), and unlike in the Western world where the day starts at midnight (therefore an offset of six hours on average). Saturday is therefore the first day of the week, as it is the day that includes the first night of the week in Arabic.

Etymologically speaking, Swahili has two "fifth" days. The words for Saturday through Wednesday contain the Bantu-derived Swahili words for "one" through "five". The word for Thursday, Alhamisi, is of Arabic origin and means "the fifth" (day). The word for Friday, Ijumaa, is also Arabic and means (day of) "gathering" for the Friday noon prayers in Islam.

Day	Saturday mosi, 'one'	Sunday pili, 'two'	Monday -tatu, 'three'	Tuesday -nne, 'four'	Wednesday -tano, 'five'	Thursday خمس, ḵams, 'five'	Friday جمعة, jumuʕa, 'to gather'
Swahili	Jumamosi	Jumapili	Jumatatu	Jumanne	Jumatano	Alhamisi	Ijumaa

== Mixing of numbering and astronomy ==
Icelandic is a special case within the Germanic languages, maintaining only the Sun and Moon (sunnudagur and mánudagur respectively), while dispensing with the names of the explicitly heathen gods. Bishop Jón Ögmundsson (AD 1052–1121) is credited with changing the names as part of an effort to uproot remnants of paganism. He jettisoned Tuesday through Friday (Týsdagur, Óðinsdagur, Þórsdagur and Freysdagur) in favour of two numbered days, "mid-week" for Wednesday (also used in some West Germanic languages), and a name linked to pious routine (föstudagur, "Fasting Day"), keeping the "washing day" (laugardagur) that is also found in other North Germanic languages.

Day	Sunday: Sól; Sunna	Monday Máni	Tuesday þriðji, 'third'	Wednesday miðvika, 'mid-week'	Thursday fimmti, 'fifth'	Friday fasta, 'fast'	Saturday laug, 'wash'
Icelandic	sunnudagur	mánudagur	þriðjudagur	miðvikudagur	fimmtudagur	föstudagur	laugardagur

In the Žejane dialect of Istro-Romanian, lur (Monday) and virer (Friday) follow the Latin convention, while utorek (Tuesday), sredu (Wednesday), and četrtok (Thursday) follow the Slavic convention.

Day	Monday diēs Lūnae, 'day of the Moon'	Tuesday *vъtorъ, *uetore, 'second'	Wednesday *serdà, 'heart'	Thursday *četvьrtъ, *četvĭrtŭ, 'fourth'	Friday diēs Veneris, 'day of Venus'	Saturday diēs Sabbatī, 'day of the Sabbath'	Sunday diēs Dominicus, 'Lord's Day'
Istro-Romanian (Žejane dialect)	lur	utorek	sredu	četrtok	virer	simbota	dumireca

There are several systems in the different Basque dialects.

Day	Monday lehen, 'first'	Tuesday arte, 'between'	Wednesday azken, 'last'	Thursday	Friday	Saturday	Sunday igan, 'to ascend'
Basque (Gipuzkoan, Standard)	astelehen	astearte	asteazken	ostegun (Note: Unclear, possibly ortzi, 'sky' related to Urtzi, or bost, 'five'.)	ostiral	larunbat (Note: Unclear etymology, likely laurden, 'fourth' or 'quarter', possibly lagun, 'companion' and batu, 'unify'.); neskenegun (Note: From neska, 'girl'.)	igande

Day	Monday	Tuesday diēs Mārtis, 'day of Mars'	Wednesday azken, 'last'	Thursday	Friday	Saturday diēs Sabbatī, 'day of the Sabbath'	Sunday diēs Dominicus, 'Lord's Day'
Basque (Biscayan)	astelena (Note: From lehen, 'first'.); ilen (Note: From diēs Lūnae, 'day of the Moon'.)	martitzena	eguaztena	eguena (Note: Unclear, possibly from egun, 'day' or argi, 'light'.)	barikua (Note: From gabe, 'without', related to the practice of fasting on this day.); egubakotx (Note: From bakoitz, 'unique'.)	zapatua	domeka

In Judaeo-Spanish (Ladino), which is mainly based on a medieval version of Spanish, the five days of Monday–Friday closely follow the Spanish names. For Sunday is used the Arabic name, which is based on numbering (meaning "Day one" or "First day"), because a Jewish language was not likely to adapt a name based on "Lord's Day" for Sunday. As in Spanish, the Ladino name for Saturday is based on Sabbath. However, as a Jewish language—and with Saturday being the actual day of rest in the Jewish community—Ladino directly adapted the Hebrew name, Shabbat.

Day	Sunday واحد, wāḥid, 'one'	Monday diēs Lūnae, 'day of the Moon'	Tuesday diēs Mārtis, 'day of Mars'	Wednesday diēs Mercuriī, 'day of Mercury'	Thursday diēs Iovis, 'day of Jupiter'	Friday diēs Veneris, 'day of Venus'	Saturday diēs Sabbatī, 'day of the Sabbath'
Judaeo-Spanish (Ladino)	aljhad; alhadh	lunes	martes	miércoles; mierkoles	djueves; juğeves	viernes	shabat

== Other naming systems ==
The days of the week in Meitei (officially known as Manipuri) originated from the Sanamahi creation myth of Meitei mythology. The Udmurt days of the week derive from their connection to traditional calendar rites. The days of the week in Yoruba derive from Yoruba religion and superstitions.

Day	Sunday	Monday	Tuesday	Wednesday	Thursday	Friday	Saturday
Meitei (Manipuri)	ꯅꯣꯡꯃꯥꯏꯖꯤꯡ; Nongmāijing ("the hill")	ꯅꯤꯡꯊꯧꯀꯥꯕ; Ningthoukāba ("king's climb")	ꯂꯩꯄꯥꯛꯄꯣꯛꯄ; Leipākpokpa ("earth's birth")	ꯌꯨꯝꯁꯀꯩꯁ; Yumsakeisa ("houses built")	ꯁꯒꯣꯜꯁꯦꯟ; Sagolsen ("horses rode")	ꯏꯔꯥꯢ; Irāi ("blood flood")	ꯊꯥꯡꯖ; Thāngja ("swords washed")
Udmurt	арнянунал arńanunal ("week day")	вордӥськон vordiśkon ("birth")	пуксён pukśon ("sitting")	вирнунал virnunal ("bloody day")	покчиарня pokćiarńa ("little Sunday")	удмуртарня udmurtarńa ("Udmurt Sunday")	кӧснунал kösnunal ("dry day")
Yoruba	Ọjọ-Aiku ("day of immortality")	Ọjọ-Aje ("day of trade")	Ọjọ-Iṣẹgun ("day of victory")	Ọjọru ("day of confusion")	Ọjọbọ ("day of arrival")	Ọjọ-Ẹti ("day of delay")	Ọjọ-Abamẹta ("day of three suggestions")

== See also ==
- Akan names of the seven-day week, known as Nnawɔtwe
- Bahá'í calendar (section Weekdays)
- Calculating the day of the week
- Week
- Work Week
- Feria
- Vāra (astronomy)

== Etymological irregularities ==
=== Sunday ===
^{☉1} Lord's Day – From Latin Dominicus (Dominica) or Greek Κυριακή (Kyriakí)

^{☉2} Holy Day and First-Day of the Week (Day of the Sun -> Light -> Resurrection -> Born again) (Christianity)

^{☉3} Resurrection (Christianity)

^{☉4} Bazaar Day

^{☉5} Market Day

^{☉6} No Work

^{☉7} Full good day

^{☉8} Borrowed from English week

^{☉9} From an Old Burmese word, not of Indic origin.

^{☉10} Prayer day

=== Monday ===
^{☽1} After No Work

^{☽2} After Bazaar

^{☽3} Head of Week

^{☽4} Master (as in Pir, because Muhammad was born on a Monday)

^{☽5} From an Old Burmese word, not of Indic origin.

^{☽6} First day of the week

=== Tuesday ===
^{♂1} Thing (Assembly), of which god Tyr/Ziu was the patron.

^{♂2} Second day of the week (cf. Hungarian kettő 'two')

^{♂3} Third day of the week.

^{♂4} From Arabic ath-Thalaathaaʼ 'third day'

^{♂5} From Proto-Slavic vъtorъ 'second'

=== Wednesday ===
^{☿1} Mid-week or Middle

^{☿2} The First Fast (Christianity)

^{☿3} Third day of the week

=== Thursday ===
^{♃1} The day between two fasts (An Dé idir dhá aoin, contracted to An Déardaoin) (Christianity)

^{♃2} Five (Arabic)

^{♃3} Fifth day of the week.

^{♃4} Fourth day of the week.

=== Friday ===
^{♀1} The Fast (Celtic) or Fasting Day (Icelandic) (Christianity)

^{♀2} Good Friday or Preparation (Christianity)

^{♀3} Jumu'ah (Friday Prayer)

^{♀4} Gathering/Assembly/Meeting (Islam) – in Malta with no Islamic connotations

^{♀5} Fifth day of the week

^{♀6} Borrowed from Germanic languages

Or canàbara, cenàbara, cenàbera, cenàbura, cenarba, chenàbara, chenabra, chenapra, chenàpura, chenarpa, chenàura, cianàbara, chenabura; meaning holy supper as preparation to the sabbathday(Saturday)

=== Saturday ===
^{♄1} Shabbat (Jewish and Christian Sabbath)

^{♄2} Wash or Bath day

^{♄3} Sun-eve (Eve of Sunday)

^{♄4} After the Gathering (Islam)

^{♄5} End of the Week (Arabic Sabt 'rest')

^{♄6} Week

^{♄7} Half good day

^{♄8} Half day
