= International Language Review =

The International Language Review (A Clearing House for Facts, Theories and Fancies on the History, Science and Bibliography of International Language Movement, ILR) was a magazine which was intended as a forum for proponents of the various international language projects to discuss and develop their ideas, started in 1955 by Floyd and Evelyn Hardin from Denver, Colorado, and published in 50 issues until 1968 (some other sources state the year to be 1966).

Floyd Hardin, together with Arturo Alfandari, helped found Friends of Neo, an organization for the promotion of the constructed language Neo.
