= Intal =

Intal may refer to:

- Intal, a brand name for the pharmaceutical drug cromoglicic acid
- Intal Albania, a brand name for the underwear factory in Albania
- Intal language, an international auxiliary language
- JC Intal, Filipino professional basketball player
