= Arturo Alfandari =

Belgian diplomat

- Born: 8 June 1888; Italy
- Died: 1 May 1969 (aged 80)
- Occupation: diplomat
- Known for: Inventor of Neo

Arturo Alfandari (8 June 1888 – 1 May 1969) was a Belgian diplomat, known as the creator of the constructed language Neo.

== Life ==
Originally from Italy, Arturo Alfandari served in the First World War as a cipher officer for the Italian High Command. After the war he settled in Belgium, where he worked as an exporter before eventually becoming a diplomat for the Belgian state. Apart from Neo, he spoke seven languages.

== Neo ==
His proposal for Neo, an international auxiliary language, was developed in the 1930s and first presented in 1961. As with Ido and some other constructed languages of the time, Alfandari's own was based on Esperanto, although he added elements from English, French, German and Russian. However, he took some further steps, reducing the use of initial and final syllables, and devising a built-in vocabulary. Root words were made as short as possible, thus emphasizing rhythm and articulation, but sometimes, as with Volapük, at the expense of easy recognition of word meanings.

War veteran Paul Rasquin, from Geraardsbergen, Belgium, described Alfandari's language as "the natural and inevitable further development of Esperanto", whilst Aldo Lavagnini considered it as "a radical and satisfying way for a reform of Esperanto, which could have been accepted by Esperantists even as a simplification of their language."

“After 25 years of research,“ a feature article in Life magazine stated, Alfandari had presented “a 1,300-page volume containing the complete grammar and 60,000-word vocabulary of his new universal language, Neo. Using Latin for many roots of words, Italian for phonetics, a vocabulary range inspired by French, adverbs and conjunctions from German and grammar from English and Russian, he claims to have welded them into a clearer and more fluent mixture than Esperanto, from which he also borrowed some structure.” He said he'd put so much effort into it because “whether you are Flemish or Walloon, white or black, American or Russian, you all want peace, to make an attempt to understand and support each other.” Despite those efforts, however, Neo became largely forgotten shortly after the death of its creator, similarly to many other constructed auxiliary languages.
