= Warren Field =

Archaeological site in Aberdeenshire, Scotland

- Interactive map of Warren Field
- 57.061295°N 2.430772°W
- Type: Mesolithic site
- Periods: Mesolithic
- Location: OS NO7397396777
- Region: Aberdeenshire

Site notes
- Excavation dates: 2004 onwards

Warren Field is a Mesolithic archaeological site in Aberdeenshire, Scotland, built about 8,000 BCE and interpreted as a calendar monument. It includes 12 pits believed to correlate with phases of the Moon and used as a lunisolar calendar. It is considered to be the oldest lunisolar calendar yet found. It is near Crathes Castle, in the Aberdeenshire region of Scotland, in the United Kingdom. It was originally discovered from the air as anomalous terrain by the Royal Commission on the Ancient and Historical Monuments of Scotland. It was first excavated in 2004.

The pits align on the southeast horizon and a prominent topographic point associated with sunrise on the midwinter solstice (thus providing an annual astronomical correction concerning the passage of time as indicated by the Moon, the asynchronous solar year, and the associated seasons). The Aberdeenshire time reckoner predates the Mesopotamian calendars by nearly 5,000 years. It was also interpreted as a seasonal calendar because the local prehistoric communities, which relied on hunting migrating animals, needed to carefully note the seasons to be prepared for a particular food source. The Warren Field site is particularly significant for its very early date and that it was created by hunter-gatherer peoples.

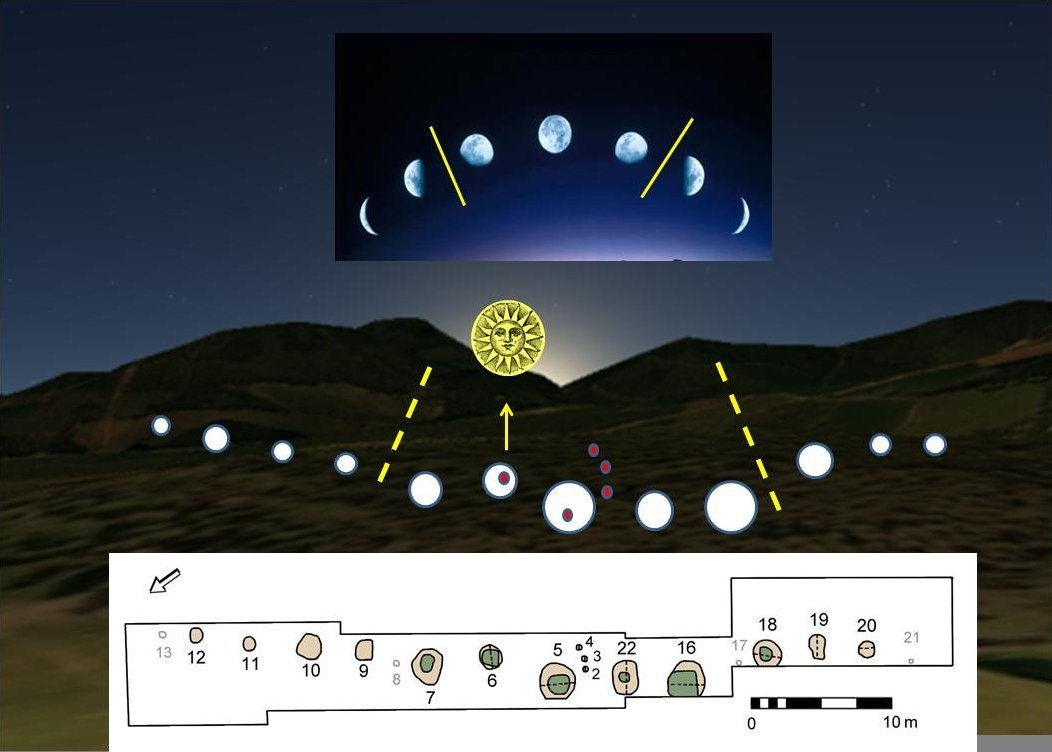
Warren Field lunar calendar, illustration.

== See also ==
- Prehistoric Scotland
- Prehistoric Britain
- Neolithic British Isles
- Göbekli Tepe – Neolithic archaeological site in Turkey
- Callanish Stones – Neolithic standing stones in the Scottish Outer Hebrides
- Stonehenge – Prehistoric monument in England
- Lunar year – A time-span of twelve lunations, ten or eleven days shorter than a solar year
  - Metonic cycle – 19 solar year recurrence of lunar phases. For example, if the winter solstice and the new moon coincide, it takes 19 solar years for the coincidence to recur.
