= Intal language =

Compromise planned language

Intal
- Created by: Erich Weferling
- Date: 1956
- Setting and usage: international auxiliary language
- Users: None
- Purpose: constructed languages: int. auxiliary languages; Ido, Novial, Neo; Intal
- Sources: a posteriori language, developed as a compromise between Esperanto, Ido, Occidental-Interlingue, Neo and Novial

Language codes
- ISO 639-3: qiw (local use)
- Glottolog: None
- IETF: art-x-intal

Intal is an international auxiliary language, published in 1956 by the German linguist Erich Weferling. Its name is an acronym for INTernational Auxiliary Language. Intal was conceived to unite the most important features of existing international auxiliary languages, like Esperanto, Ido, Occidental-Interlingue, Neo, Novial and Interlingua, into a compromise system.

== History ==
In the year 1956 Erich Weferling published the first version of his system Intal. The final version of Intal was published by Weferling in the year 1978.

Weferling saw his Intal as a compromise among the most important constructed languages, so he deliberately abstained from creating a complete dictionary of Intal. He regarded the existing different constructed languages as dialects of one common international language. He recommended using the vocabulary of the major international auxiliary languages, adapted to the orthography and phonology of Intal.

Weferling wrote most of his material on Intal in the language himself. In the year 1976 Weferling even published his autobiography Ek le vive de un oldi interlinguistiker (From the life of an old Interlinguist) in Intal.

After Weferling died in 1982, his efforts were nearly forgotten and the authorities of the surviving constructed language organizations showed no readiness to change their system according to Intal or to unify.

== Orthography ==
=== Alphabet and pronunciation ===
Intal alphabet
Number	1	2	3	4	5	6	8	8	9	10	11	12	13	14	15	16	17	18	19	20	21	22	23
Upper case	A	B	C	D	E	F	G	H	I	J	K	L	M	N	O	P	R	S	T	U	V	Y	Z
Lower case	a	b	c	d	e	f	g	h	i	j	k	l	m	n	o	p	r	s	t	u	v	y	z
IPA phoneme	a	b	ʃ	d	e	f	g	h	i	ʒ	k	l	m	n	o	p	r	s	t	u	v	j	z

Intal uses the Latin script without special signs. The Intal alphabet has 23 letters, 5 vowels (a, e, i, o, u) and 18 consonants (b, c, d, f, g, h, j, k, l, m, n, p, r, s, t, v, y, z). The consonants q, w and x are only used in proper names and foreign words.

c is pronounced /ʃ/ (like English sh), g always hard (as in German), j as in French, and y and z as in English.

The stress of a word is on the vowel before the last consonant, unless marked by an accent as in idé and tabú.

== Phonology ==
=== Consonants ===
	Labial		Alveolar		Postalveolar		Palatal	Velar		Glottal
Nasal	m		n							
Stop	p	b	t	d				k	g	
Fricative	f	v	s	z	ʃ	ʒ				h
Approximate			l				j			
Trill			r							

=== Vowels ===
	Front	Back
Close	i	u
Mid	e	o
Open	a	

== Grammar ==
=== Articles ===
The definite article in Intal is le. It is used the same for singular and plural and for all genders. The indefinite article in Intal is un. It is used for all genders, but only in singular.

=== Nouns ===
Nouns have no specific ending. The usual euphonic ending is -e like: libre book, table table, but also manu hand and hotel hotel.

Natural gender of living entities can be expressed by -o for male gender and -a for female gender: like kavale horse, kavalo stallion, kavala mare.

The plural is marked by 's like table's tables.

The genitive case is expressed by the preposition de and with the definite article it becomes del, like del patro of the father. The dative case which indicates the indirect object is formed by the preposition a or with the definite article al, like al patro to the father. The accusative case which indicates the direct object is identical with the nominative. Only when the word order is changed one can use the particle -em, like Vu-em me danka It is you that I thank.

=== Adjective ===
Adjectives end usually in –i as in Novial: boni good, beli beautiful. The ending -i can be omitted for euphonic reasons. The adjective is not changed according to case, gender or singular/plural. It is placed before the subject.

=== Adverbs ===
Adverbs are mostly derived from adjectives by changing the ending to –im. Examples: bonim well, verim truly.

=== Verbs ===
- Intal has no distinct infinitive ending; the infinitive is identical with the present tense, which ends always in -a. So vida means "to see" and me vida means "I see".
- The past tense is formed either by placing the particle did before the infinitive/present tense form of the verb or with the ending -ed. So one can say me did vida or me vided, "I saw".
- The future tense is formed with the particle ve in front of the infinitive/present form of the verb: me ve vida "I will see".
- The conditional is formed by placing the particle vud before the infinitive/present form of the verb: me vud vida "I would see".
- The imperative ending is -u: Venu! Come!
- The active participle is formed by -ant after the stem of the verb, like amant loving, soluant solving.
- The passive participle is formed by -at at the stem of the verb, like amat loved, soluat solved.
- The passive voice which means action is formed with the help of the particle fi and the passive participle of the verb. Me fi konvinked I become convinced. If the passive voice is describing a state then it is expressed by the auxiliary verb es "to be". Le porte es klozat dum le toti nokte The door is closed during the whole night.

=== Pronouns ===
- Singular pronouns: me I, me, tu you, il he, el she, it it, ol it for a living entity whose gender is not defined.
- Plural pronouns: nos, vus, les
- Possessive adjectives are formed by adding the ending -i to the personal pronouns: mei my, tui your, sui his or her, ilsui his, elsui her, nosi our, vusi your (Plural) lesi their.
- Reflexive pronoun is se, but it is only used for the third person singular or plural: Il lava se He washes himself, but Me lava me I wash myself.
- The impersonal pronoun is on one.

=== Numerals ===
- Cardinal numbers: un, du, tri, kvar, kvin, siks, sep, ok, nin, dek, dekun, dekdu,..., dudek, dudek un, ..., tridek,..., sent, mil, milion, miliard'
- Ordinal numbers are formed by adding the ending –ti to the cardinal numbers: prim/unti first, duti second, triti third.

=== Prepositions ===
in in, a to, sur on, etc.

=== Conjunctions ===
e and, o or, si if, ma but, etc.

=== Syntax ===
The basic word order is subject–verb–object.

== Samples ==
Ode to Joy by Friedrich Schiller

Ode al joye

Joye, bel deal sintile,
Filia ek Elizium,
Nos vol entra, fairo-ebri,
Tui santuarium.
Tui sorsies liga ri
Ko da mode seperat.
Omni hom's devena frate's,
Ku tu joy' fi kultivat.

Esu embrasat milione's!
E ti kiss al toti mond'!
Frate's, super stele's-rond'
Es un Deo in äone's.

Translation:

Ode to joy

Joy, beautiful sparkle of the gods,
Daughter of Elysium,
We enter, fire-drunk,
Your shrine.
Your magic binds again
What custom has parted.
All men become brothers
Where you Joy becomes cultivated.

Be embraced, millions!
And this kiss to the entire world!
Brothers, above the starry circle
There is a God in heaven.

== Bibliography ==
- Vera K. Barandovská-Frank: Erich Weferling. Tri jardekoj de lingvofajlado. In: Tazio Carlevaro (Red.): Domaine de la recherche en linguistique appliquée. Bellinzona 1998, p. 196 - 210 (in Esperanto).
- Weferling, Erich: Ek le vive de un oldi interlinguistiker. Braunschweig 1976 (in Intal).
- Weferling. Erich: Intal. Braunschweig 1964 (in Intal).
- Weferling, Erich: Komparation inter Esperanto e Intal in kontrapozati tabeles. Braunschweig 1978 (in Intal).
- Weferling, Erich: Die Plansprache Intal, ein Versuch der Einheitsbildung. Braunschweig 1976 (10th edition) (in German).
- Weferling, Erich: Standard-Gramatike del international planlingue INTAL. Braunschweig 1978 (28th edition) (in Intal).
