= Neo language =

Artificially constructed language

Neo
- Created by: Arturo Alfandari
- Date: 1961
- Setting and usage: International auxiliary language
- Purpose: Constructed language: International auxiliary language; Neo
- Sources: Most of the vocabulary from Romance and some from Germanic languages; phonology from Romance and Slavic languages

Official status
- Regulated by: Akademio de Neo (now defunct)

Language codes
- ISO 639-3: neu
- Glottolog: neoa1234

Neo is an international auxiliary language created by Arturo Alfandari, a Belgian diplomat of Italian descent. It combines features of Esperanto, Ido, Novial, and Volapük. The root base of Neo is closely related to French, with some influence from English.

== History ==
The basic version of Neo was published in 1937 by Arturo Alfandari. It attracted attention in 1961 when Alfandari published his books Cours Pratique de Neo and The Rapid Method of Neo. The works included both brief and complete grammars, a learning course of 44 lectures, translations of literary works, scientific and technical texts, idioms, and detailed bidirectional French and English dictionaries. The total volume of the publications was 1,304 pages, with dictionaries numbering some 75,000 words.

The language combines the features of Esperanto or Ido, with the same goal: a simple, neutral and easy-to-learn second language for everybody.

Neo attracted the interest of the circle around the International Language Review, a periodical for IAL proponents whose publishers co-founded the international Friends of Neo (Amikos de Neo) with Alfandari; the organization also published its bulletin, the Neo-bulten. For a few years it looked like Neo could give some serious competition to Esperanto and Interlingua.

As Alfandari's health worsened, to avoid disappearance of his language, he founded a second, more serious organization: the Academy of Neo (Akademio de Neo), with the task of regulating, nurturing and spreading the language; but the organization was not very successful. Progress was cut short by Alfandari's death in 1969 and the language was mostly forgotten.

== Overview ==
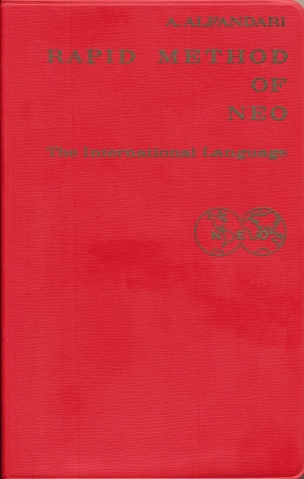
The cover of The Rapid Method of Neo

Grammatically, the language is mostly influenced by Ido and Esperanto; though some characteristics such as a plural -s and natural-appearing pronouns come from naturalistic IALs like Interlingua and Interlingue.

The way of forming the vocabulary and the preference for short, monosyllabic words show a substantial Volapük influence but, unlike the latter's roots which are often changed and mutilated beyond recognition, the Neo roots are easily recognizable as Romance.

It is also notable for its terseness, which exceeds that of English or any International auxiliary language (IAL) of the a priori type, which makes it very compact and brief in expression, and for the facility of its grammar whose overview occupies only two pages.

== Phonology ==
=== Consonants ===
	Labial		Alveolar		Postalveolar		Palatal	Velar		Glottal
Nasal		m		n					(ŋ)	
Stop	p	b	t	d				k	ɡ	
Fricative	f	v	s	z	ʃ					h
Affricate			ts		tʃ	dʒ				
Approximant		w		l			j			
Trill				r						

=== Vowels ===
	Front	Back
Close	i	u
Mid	e	o
Open	a	

== Orthography ==
=== Alphabet ===
Neo alphabet (+ digraphs)
Number	1	2	3	4	5	6	8	8	9	10	11	12	13	14	15	16	17	18	19	20	21	22	23	24	25	26	-	-
Upper case	A	B	C	D	E	F	G	H	I	J	K	L	M	N	O	P	Q	R	S	T	U	V	W	X	Y	Z	SH	TS
Lower case	a	b	c	d	e	f	g	h	i	j	k	l	m	n	o	p	q	r	s	t	u	v	w	x	y	z	sh	ts
IPA phoneme	a	b	t͡ʃ	d	e	f	g	h	i	d͡ʒ	k	l	m	n	o	p	kw	r	s	t	u	v	w	ks	j	z	ʃ	t͡s

Neo uses the 26 letters of the standard Roman alphabet: 5 vowels and 21 consonants. When spelling a word, the consonants have an -e ending:

a, be, ce, de, e, fe, ge, he, i, je, ke, le, me, ne, o, pe, qe, re, se, te, u, ve, we, xe, ye, ze.

=== Pronunciation ===
Examples:
Neo	English approximation
c (ch)	chair, such
g	garden, log
j	jewel, badge
q (kw)	quart, liquid
s	some, mash
sh	shall, mash
ts	tsetse, lots
w	wing, southwest
x (ks)	oxen, taxes
y	yarn, yogurt

The c has the same pronunciation as the digraph ch; both are pronounced as in English words like chalk or chimney, and in borrowed Italian words like ciao or bocconcini, never with the 'k' sound in care or the 's' sound in certain. The g always has the “hard” pronunciation of get or good, never the “soft” pronunciation of gem or giant. The s is always unvoiced, never pronounced with the 'z' sound in rose or the 'zh' sound in leisure.

Other letters, including the vowels, are pronounced as in Esperanto. Words with the letters q (not pronounced 'kjoo' but as in English 'qu') and x (pronounced 'ks' without an initial vowel) may optionally be spelled with kw and ks, respectively. Each letter is always spoken in the same way, except that final h is silent in a few borrowed words like pashah, muftih, kadih, papah, mamah.

=== Spelling ===
All words are written with initial small letters (minuscules), except for proper nouns and the first word of a sentence.

=== Stress ===
Words ending in a vowel have a stress accent on the second-last syllable. Words ending in a consonant have a stress accent on the last syllable.

Examples:
Neo	English meaning
libro	book
patro	father
kemio	chemistry
folyo	leaf
garden	garden
amik	friend

The plural -s or -os does not affect the stress accent.

Examples:
Neo	English meaning
libros	books
gardenos	gardens
amikos	friends

In the combinations uo, au and eu, the vowels are to be pronounced separately, not as diphthongs. Nevertheless, the stress accent does not fall on the u in these vowel combinations.

Examples:
Neo	English meaning
linguo	language
auto	automobile
neutra	neuter (grammatical gender)

== Grammar ==
The articles are invariable:

- lo (the): lo frato, lo soro, lo arbro → l'arbro
- un (a/an): un arbro

Adjectives end in a and are invariable:

- un bona soro, un bona frato, lo bona fratos (no s added to lo, nor to bona)

Adverbs end in e and are invariable:

- bon → bone

Singular nouns end in o, which can be dropped, as long as the pronunciations remain very easy. Plural nouns end in os.

- arbro, frat(o), sor(o), arbros

Pronoun declension
English	Subject	Object	Possessive
I	mi	me	ma
you	tu	te	ta
he	il	le	la
she	el	le/ley	la
it	it	le/it	la
(reflexive)	so	se	sa
we	nos	ne	na
you	vu	ve	va
they (m.)	zi	ze	za
they (f.)	zel	ze/zey	za

There is also the pronoun ziel for mixed-sex group.

- Mi vidar te = I see you
- Tu vidar me = You see me

Verbs:

- Present: ar → mi vidar (I see)
- Past: ir → mi vidir (I saw/have seen)
- Future: or → mi vidor (I will see)
- Conditional: ur → mi vidur (I would see)
- Imperative/infinitive: iu or u (the latter for polysyllabic verbs) → vidu! (See!)
- Past participle: at → vidat (adjective: vidata) (seen)
- Present participle: ande → vidande (adjective: vidanda) (seeing)
- Future participle: inde → vidinde (adjective: vidinda) (will be seen)

== Samples ==
The Lord's Prayer

Na Patro ki sar in cel,
siu ta nom santat.
Venu ta regno.
Siu fat ta vol,
asben in cel, as on ter.
Na shakida pan ne diu oje.
E ne pardonu na debos,
as nos pardonar na deberos.
E no ne induku in tentado,
mo ne fridu da mal.

Sentences

Look before you leap. = Miru pri salti.
Goodnight, Miss Wilson. = Bonnox, Damel Wilson.
What do you call this in Neo? = Kom namar vu eto nee?
Where are you going? = Qo tu?
It's none of my business. = Eto no ma eco.

Numbers

1 un, 2 du, 3 tre, 4 qar, 5 qin, 6 sit, 7 sep, 8 ot, 9 non, 10 is
11 isun, 12 isdu
20 duis, 21 duisun, ... 30 treis, 40 qaris
100 ek, 1000 mil
5184 qinmil ek otis qar
3522 tremil qinek duis du

Wanderer's Nightsong (German: Wanderers Nachtlied) by Johann Wolfgang von Goethe

Noxkant del wander

On tot cimos sar
Ripozo,
In tot et lokos
Tu sentar
Apene un soplo;
Nel bosko l'ezetos tacar.
Duldu, sun tu
An ripozor.

Wanderer's Nightsong

Up there all summits
are still.
In all the tree-tops
you will
feel but the dew.
The birds in the forest stopped talking.
Soon, done with walking,
you shall rest, too.

Wanderers Nachtlied

Über allen Gipfeln
Ist Ruh,
In allen Wipfeln
Spürest du
Kaum einen Hauch;
Die Vögelein schweigen im Walde.
Warte nur, balde
Ruhest du auch.

The Task by Douglas Blacklock

Lo Tasko

Vortos sirvar asben informo
As tromplo e traplo.
Deo volvar lo kor del omos
Dal veg de sklavos
Al veg de Frido.
Lo brev simpla vortos de Neo
Utin ne inspiru
L'uto justa
De Parlo e Skribo.

The Task

Words are used both to inform
And to deceive and ensnare.
God turns mens hearts
From the path of slavery
To that of Freedom.
The unadorned short words of Neo
May become an inspiration
To the rightful use
Of Speech and Writing.

Lo diplomata linguos

Latin sir, us l'endo del issepa seklo, l'oficala linguo de diplomatio. Latine so redaktir lo tratalos e l'akordos e so skambir lo komunikos inte governos. Lo last gran tratal ridaktat latine sir lo de Westfalio, in 1648; depdan kauzel preeminenta plas trenat pe Franso, Latin pokpoke cedar plas a fransal; e fransal restar us l'enso d'et seklo - us 1918 - lo diplomata linguo, lo linguo de tot internasyona medos.

Ab 1918, lo diplomata linguos jar du: fransal e anglal. In et du linguos, sir meant lo negosados pol Versailles-Tratal e pol osa paxtratalos de 1919 e sir ridaktat et tratalos, amba linguos fande fid; dok no sen inkonvenos, lo du textos pande somyes determeni def interpretazos.

Do 1945, espanal, rusal e cinal sir an admitat as oficala linguos. Nos nun nel epok de tradukeros e interpretos.

(Gino Buti)

Ka sor l'avena diplomata linguo?

Sar nel internasyona riunos, konferensos e kongresos, dey num pluar idide, ke lo neso d'un monda adlinguo se far senti pluste.

Nilo samtempe plu groteska e plu afligifa qam lo spekto ofrat pel kongresistos munat kon udokaskos, ki tentar, sen sem riusi, kapi lo diskorsos pronuncat in def lingoes. Diskorsos tradukat aste pe interpretos, dey lo melestas sar force, konforme l'itala dikton: tradukeros, trazeros.

Es so exijur dal parpreneros lo kono d'un komuna adlinguo, ke zi pur apreni kon infana izeso, so fur ilke un enorma ekonomio de temp, dengo... e de malkomprenos.

(Arturo Alfandari)

== Samples ==
Sentences

Look before you leap. = Miru pri salti.
Goodnight, Miss Wilson. = Bonnox, Damel Wilson.
What do you call this in Neo? = Kom namar vu eto nee?
Where are you going? = Qo tu?
It's none of my business. = Eto no ma eco.

Numbers

1 un, 2 du, 3 tre, 4 qar, 5 qin, 6 sit, 7 sep, 8 ot, 9 non, 10 is
11 isun, 12 isdu
20 duis, 21 duisun, ... 30 treis, 40 qaris
100 ek, 1000 mil
5184 qinmil ek otis qar
3522 tremil qinek duis du

Wanderer's Nightsong (German: Wanderers Nachtlied) by Johann Wolfgang von Goethe

Noxkant del wander

On tot cimos sar
Ripozo,
In tot et lokos
Tu sentar
Apene un soplo;
Nel bosko l'ezetos tacar.
Duldu, sun tu
An ripozor.

Wanderer's Nightsong

Up there all summits
are still.
In all the tree-tops
you will
feel but the dew.
The birds in the forest stopped talking.
Soon, done with walking,
you shall rest, too.

Wanderers Nachtlied

Über allen Gipfeln
Ist Ruh,
In allen Wipfeln
Spürest du
Kaum einen Hauch;
Die Vögelein schweigen im Walde.
Warte nur, balde
Ruhest du auch.

The Task by Douglas Blacklock

Lo Tasko

Vortos sirvar asben informo
As tromplo e traplo.
Deo volvar lo kor del omos
Dal veg de sklavos
Al veg de Frido.
Lo brev simpla vortos de Neo
Utin ne inspiru
L'uto justa
De Parlo e Skribo.

The Task

Words are used both to inform
And to deceive and ensnare.
God turns mens hearts
From the path of slavery
To that of Freedom.
The unadorned short words of Neo
May become an inspiration
To the rightful use
Of Speech and Writing.

Lo diplomata linguos

Latin sir, us l'endo del issepa seklo, l'oficala linguo de diplomatio. Latine so redaktir lo tratalos e l'akordos e so skambir lo komunikos inte governos. Lo last gran tratal ridaktat latine sir lo de Westfalio, in 1648; depdan kauzel preeminenta plas trenat pe Franso, Latin pokpoke cedar plas a fransal; e fransal restar us l'enso d'et seklo - us 1918 - lo diplomata linguo, lo linguo de tot internasyona medos.

Ab 1918, lo diplomata linguos jar du: fransal e anglal. In et du linguos, sir meant lo negosados pol Versailles-Tratal e pol osa paxtratalos de 1919 e sir ridaktat et tratalos, amba linguos fande fid; dok no sen inkonvenos, lo du textos pande somyes determeni def interpretazos.

Do 1945, espanal, rusal e cinal sir an admitat as oficala linguos. Nos nun nel epok de tradukeros e interpretos.

(Gino Buti)

Ka sor l'avena diplomata linguo?

Sar nel internasyona riunos, konferensos e kongresos, dey num pluar idide, ke lo neso d'un monda adlinguo se far senti pluste.

Nilo samtempe plu groteska e plu afligifa qam lo spekto ofrat pel kongresistos munat kon udokaskos, ki tentar, sen sem riusi, kapi lo diskorsos pronuncat in def lingoes. Diskorsos tradukat aste pe interpretos, dey lo melestas sar force, konforme l'itala dikton: tradukeros, trazeros.

Es so exijur dal parpreneros lo kono d'un komuna adlinguo, ke zi pur apreni kon infana izeso, so fur ilke un enorma ekonomio de temp, dengo... e de malkomprenos.

(Arturo Alfandari)

=== Lord's Prayer ===
For comparison the Lord's Prayer is provided in Frater

Neo

No Papa, kel es in sela,
tu noma es sanktita,
tu regna veni,
tu vola es fa sur terra, komo in sela.
Dona a no hodi no pano di kada diko,
e pardona a no no kulpas,
komo no pardona no kulpanti,
e no mena a no in tentia,
ma libera a no de mala.
Amen.

English

Our Father, who art in heaven,
hallowed be thy name,
thy kingdom come,
thy will be done, on earth as it is in heaven.
Give us this day our daily bread,
and forgive us our debts
as we have forgiven our debtors,
and lead us not into temptation,
but deliver us from evil.
Amen.

== Bibliography ==
- Arturo Alfandari, Cours pratique de NEO, Brussel, Éditions Brepols, 1961. (DJVU 23.3 MB)
- Arturo Alfandari, Méthode rapide de NEO, Brussel, Éditions Brepols, 1965. (DJVU 4.5 MB)
- Arturo Alfandari, Rapid method of NEO, Brussel, Éditions Brepols, 1966. (DJVU 4.7 MB)
