= Candy =

Sweet confection

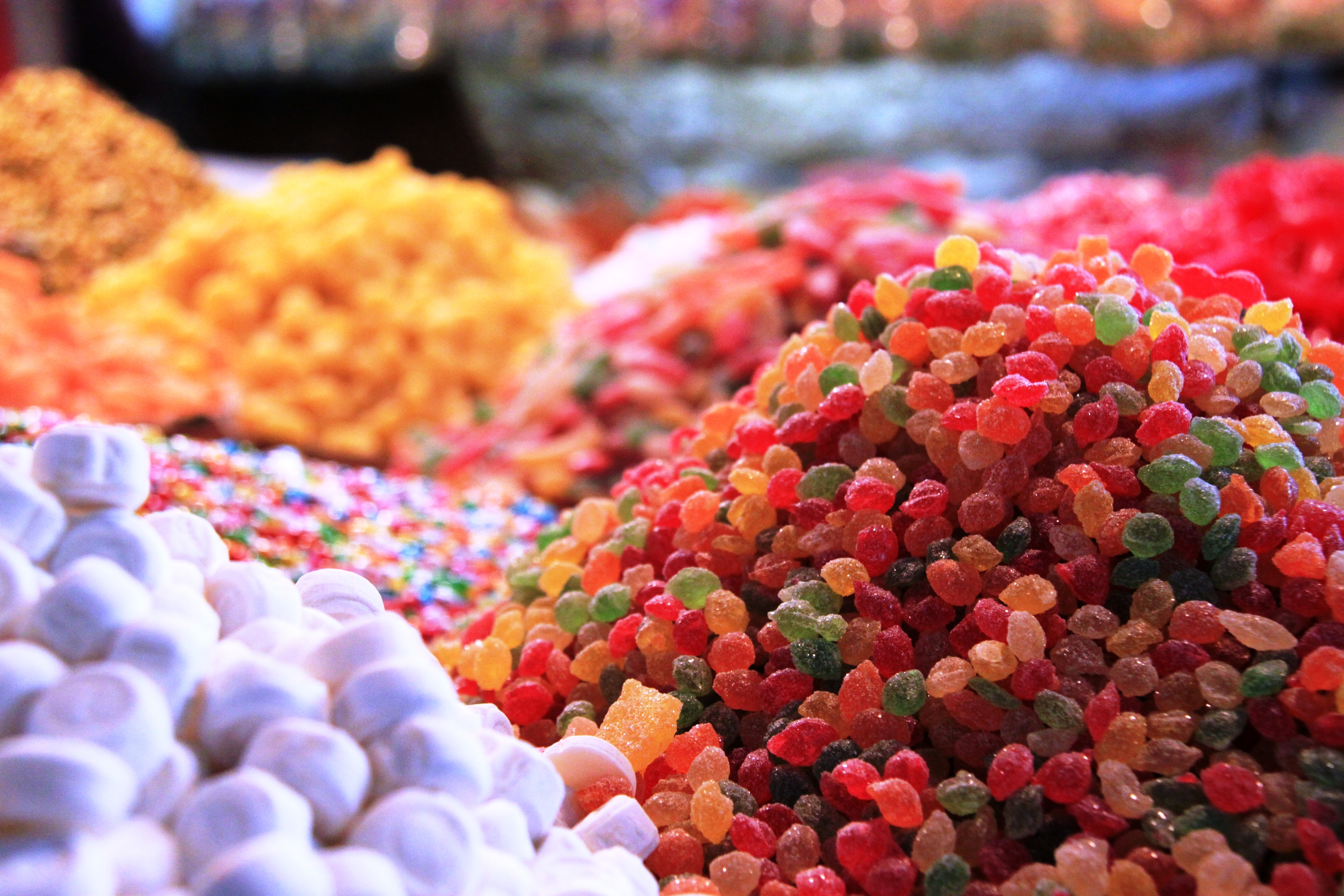
- Candy at a bazaar in Damascus, Syria
- Alternative names: Sweets/sweeties, lollies
- Type: Sugar confectionery
- Main ingredients: Sugar or honey

Candy, also known as sweets and lollies, (Note: "Candy" is used chiefly in Canada and the US, "sweets" in the UK and Ireland, and "lollies" in Australia and New Zealand.) is a confection that features sugar as a principal ingredient. The category, sugar confectionery, encompasses any sweet confection, including chocolate or chewing gum. Sugar-glazed vegetables, fruit, or nuts are considered candied.

Candy has large amounts of sugar or sugar substitutes, usually made in smaller pieces. However, candy also depends upon how people treat the food. Often with fingers, people eat them casually as a snack between meals. However, each culture has its own ideas of what constitutes candy rather than dessert. The same food may be a candy in one culture and a dessert in another.

== History ==
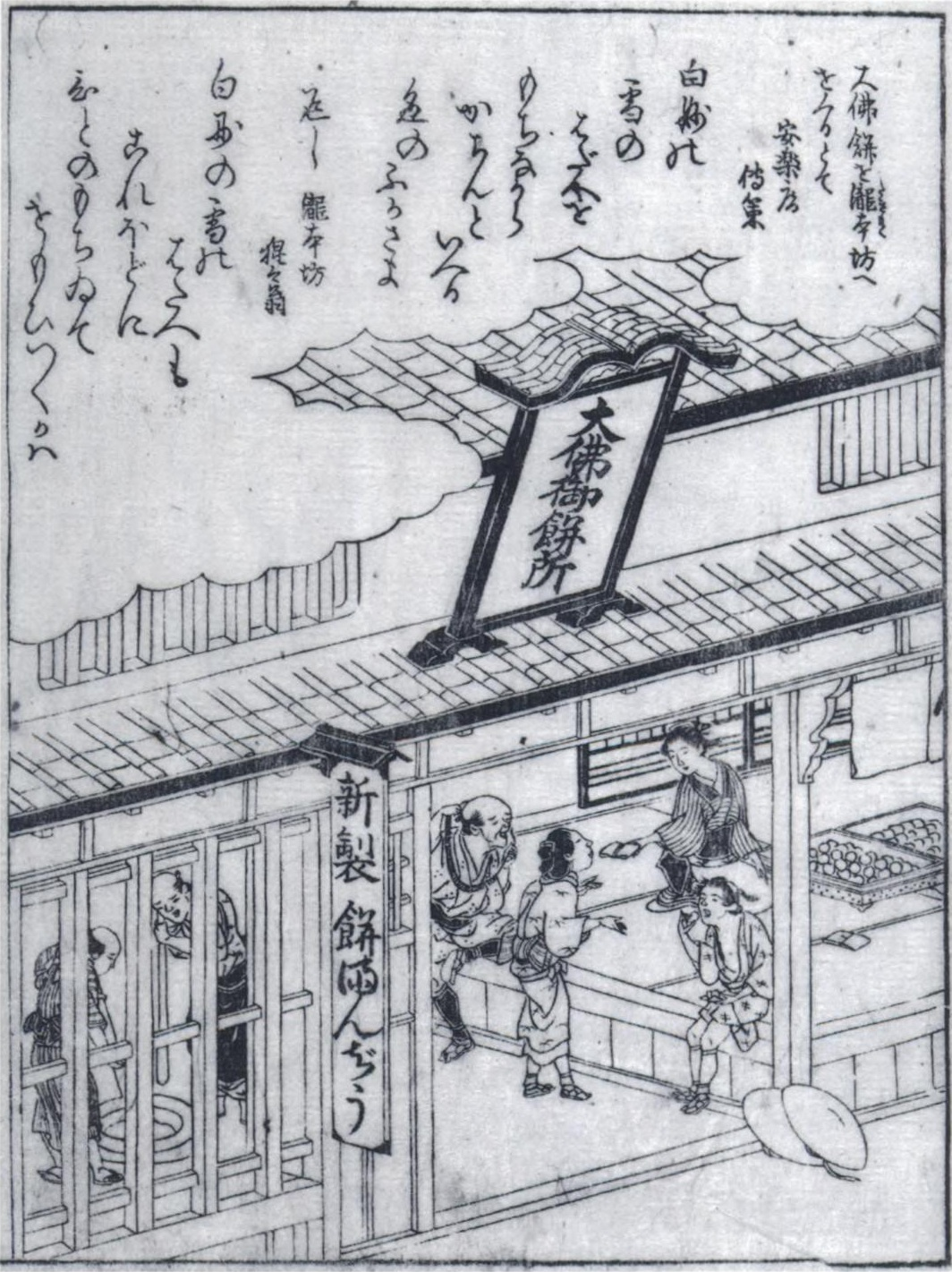
A Japanese vendor selling sweets in "The Great Buddha Sweet Shop" from the Miyako meisho zue (1787)

The word candy entered the English language from the Old French çucre candi (transl. "sugar candy"). The French term may had earlier roots in the Arabic qandi, Persian qand and Sanskrit khanda, all words for sugar.

Sugarcane is indigenous to tropical South and Southeast Asia. Pieces of sugar were produced by boiling sugarcane juice in ancient India and consumed as khanda. Between the 6th and 4th centuries BCE, the Persians, followed by the Greeks, discovered the people in India and their "reeds that produce honey without bees". They adopted and then spread sugar and sugarcane agriculture.

Before sugar was readily available, candy was based on honey. Honey was used in Ancient China, the Middle East, Egypt, Greece and the Roman Empire to coat fruits and flowers to preserve them or to create forms of candy. Candy is still served in this form today, though now it is more typically seen as a type of garnish.

Before the Industrial Revolution, candy was often considered a form of medicine, either used to calm the digestive system or cool a sore throat. In the Middle Ages candy appeared on the tables of only the most wealthy at first. At that time, it began as a combination of spices and sugar used as an aid to digestion. Banquet hosts typically served these types of 'candies' at banquets for their guests. One of these candies, sometimes called chamber spice, was made with cloves, ginger, aniseed, juniper berries, almonds and pine kernels dipped in melted sugar.

The Middle English word candy began to be used in the late 13th century.

The first candy came to America during the early 18th century from Britain and France. Only a few of the early colonists were proficient in sugar work and sugary treats were generally only enjoyed by the very wealthy. Even the simplest form of candy – rock candy, made from crystallized sugar – was considered a luxury.

=== Industrial Revolution ===
The candy business underwent a drastic change in the 1830s when technological advances and the availability of sugar opened up the market. The new market was not only for the enjoyment of the rich but also for the pleasure of the working class. There was also an increasing market for children. While some fine confectioners remained, the candy store became a favorite of the child of the American working class. Penny candies epitomized this transformation of candy. Penny candy became the first material good that children spent their own money on. For this reason, candy store-owners relied almost entirely on the business of children to keep them running. Even penny candies were directly descended from medicated lozenges that held bitter medicine in a hard sugar coating.

In 1847, the invention of the candy press (also known under the name of a toy machine) made it possible to produce multiple shapes and sizes of candy at once. In 1851, confectioners began to use a revolving steam pan to assist in boiling sugar. This change meant that the candy maker was no longer required to continuously stir the boiling sugar. The heat from the surface of the pan was also evenly distributed and made it less likely the sugar would burn. These innovations made it possible for only one or two people to successfully run a candy business.

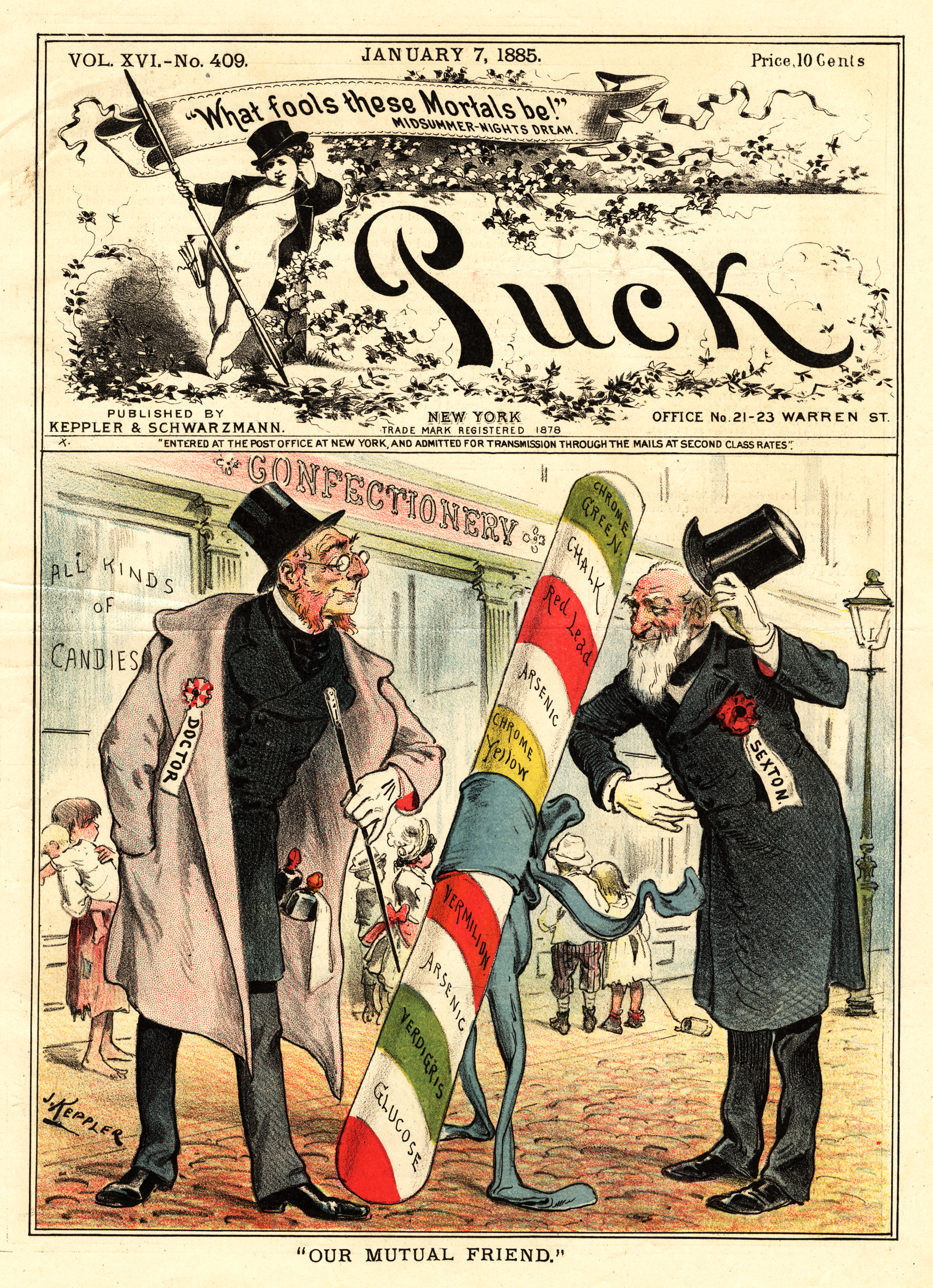
Our Mutual Friend, January 7, 1885, satirical cartoon by Joseph Keppler, warning of the dangers of color additives used in candy.

As the path from producer to market became complicated, many foods were affected by adulteration and the addition of additives which ranged from harmless ingredients, such as cheap cornstarch and corn syrup, to poisonous ones. Some manufacturers produced bright colors in candy by the addition of hazardous substances for which there was no legal regulation: green (chromium(III) oxide and copper acetate), red (lead(II,IV) oxide and mercury sulfide), yellow (lead chromate) and white (chalk, arsenic trioxide).

In an 1885 cover cartoon for Puck, Joseph Keppler satirized the dangers of additives in candy by depicting the "mutual friendship" between striped candy, doctors, and gravediggers. By 1906, research into the dangers of additives, exposés of the food industry, and public pressure led to the passage of the Pure Food and Drug Act, the first federal United States law to regulate food and drugs, including candy.

== Classification ==
Sugar candies include hard candies, soft candies, caramels, marshmallows, taffy, and other candies whose principal ingredient is sugar. Commercially, sugar candies are often divided into groups according to the amount of sugar they contain and their chemical structure.

Hard-boiled candies made by the vacuum cooking process include stick candy, lemon drops and horehound drops. Open-fire candy, like molasses taffy and cream taffy, is cooked in open kettles and then pulled. Pan work candies include nuts and candies such as jelly beans and sugar-coated almonds, made by coating with sugar in revolving copper kettles. Gum work candy is cooked in large kettles fashioned for melting and molded, dried and sugared like gum drops. They are soaked for a time in sugar syrup to allow crystals to form.

Sugar candies can be classified into non-crystalline and crystalline types. This is based on microscopic crystal structure, and not on the visible appearance of the candy, so a piece of candy that looks like a crystal may well be a noncrystalline type. Noncrystalline candies are homogeneous and may be chewy or hard; they include hard candies, caramels, toffees, and nougats. Crystalline candies incorporate small crystals in their structure, meaning they have a creamy texture that melts in the mouth or are easily chewed; these include fondant and fudge. In 2022, flavorless candy was developed that was hard but not sweet.

Comparison of sugar candies

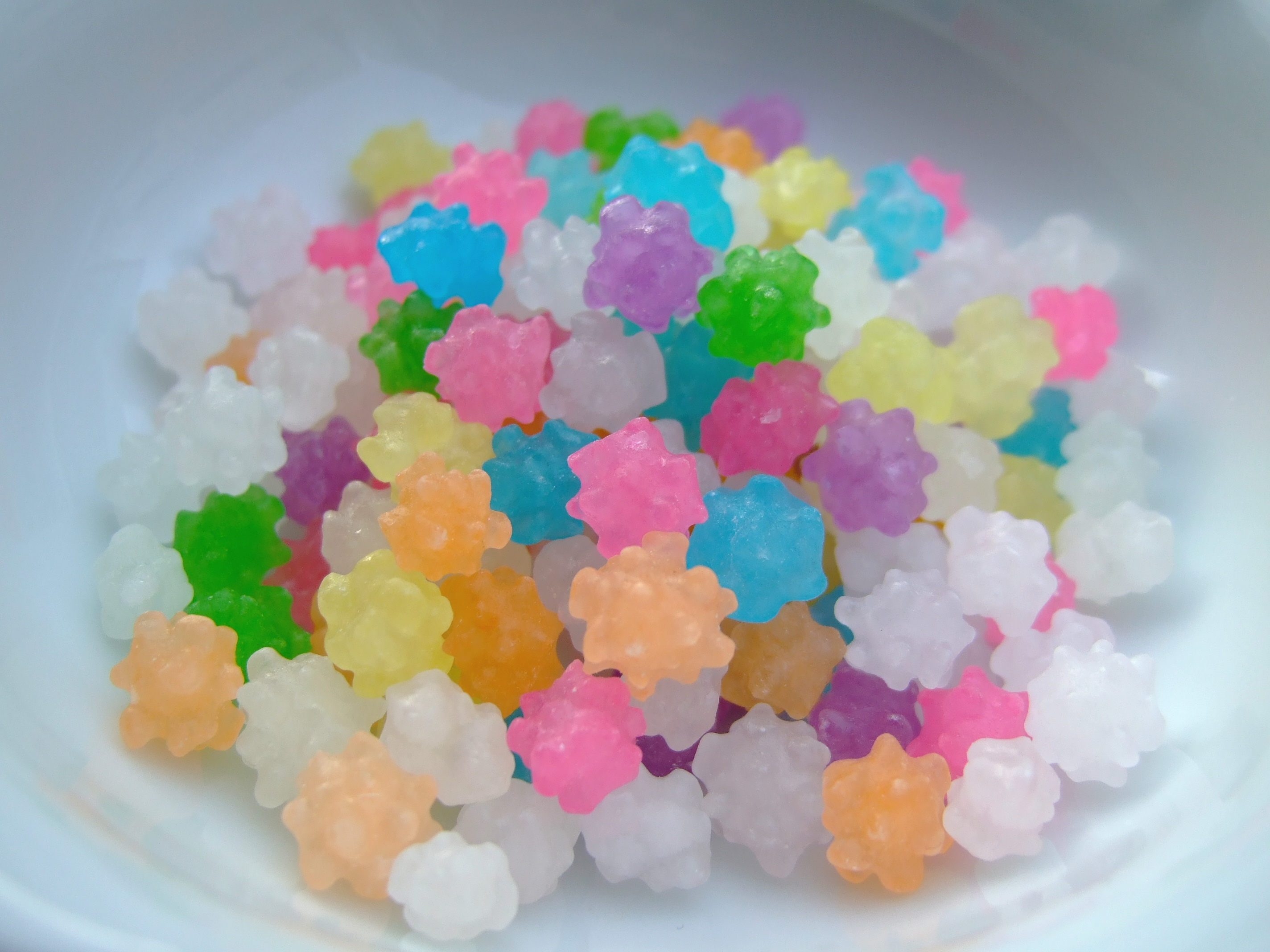
Konpeitō is a traditional Japanese sugar candy. When finished, it is almost 100% solid sugar.

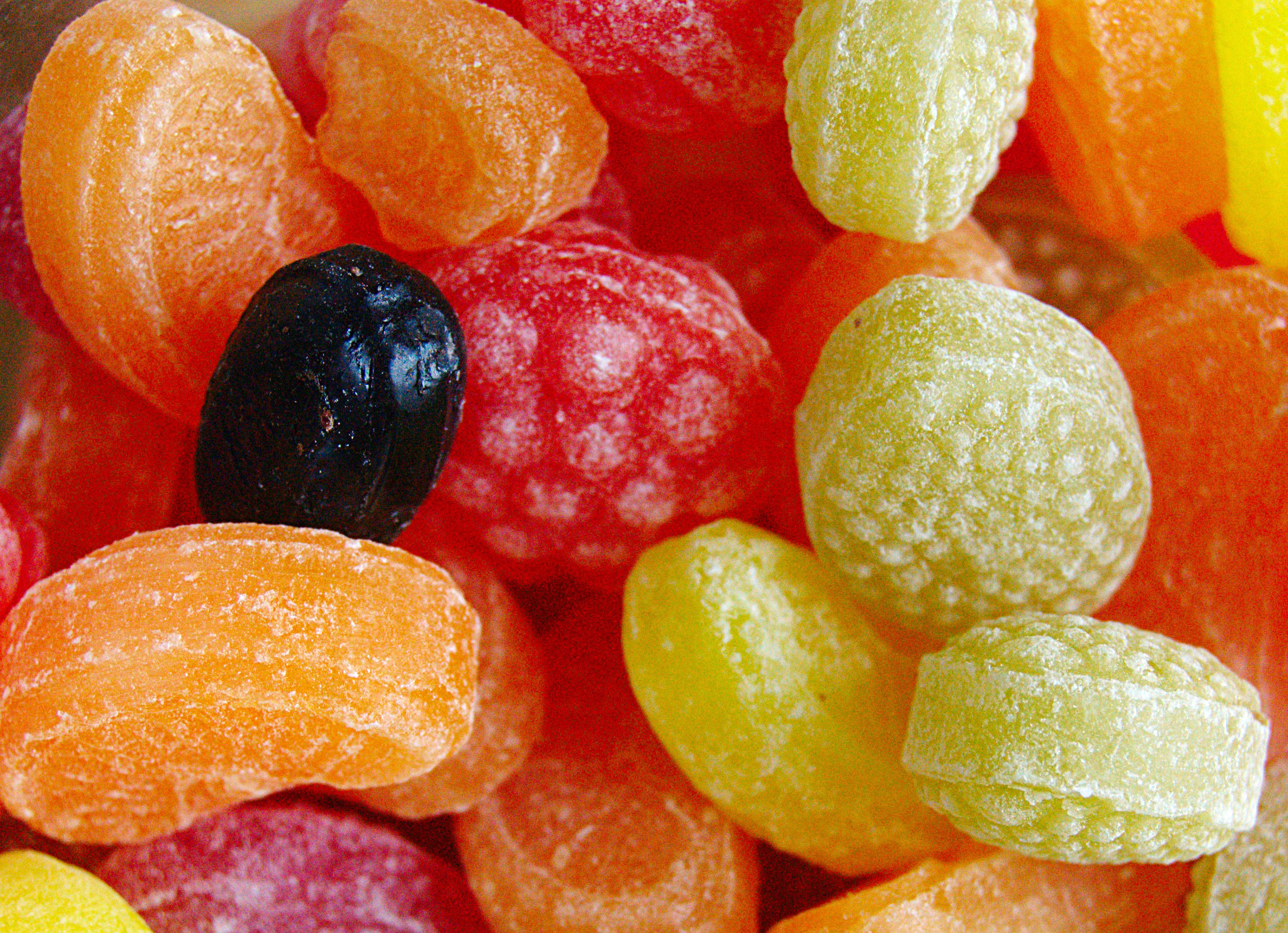
Fruit-shaped hard candy is a common type of sugar candy, containing sugar, color, flavor, and a tiny bit of water.

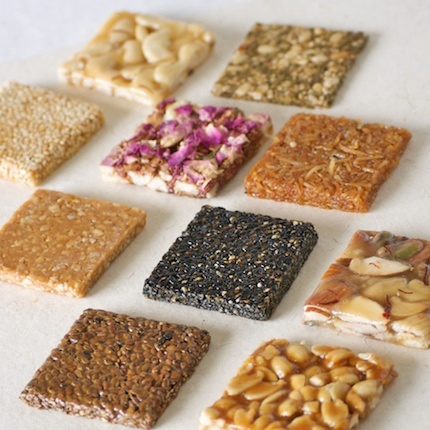
Chikki are homemade nut brittles popular in India. Between the nuts or seeds is hard sugar candy.

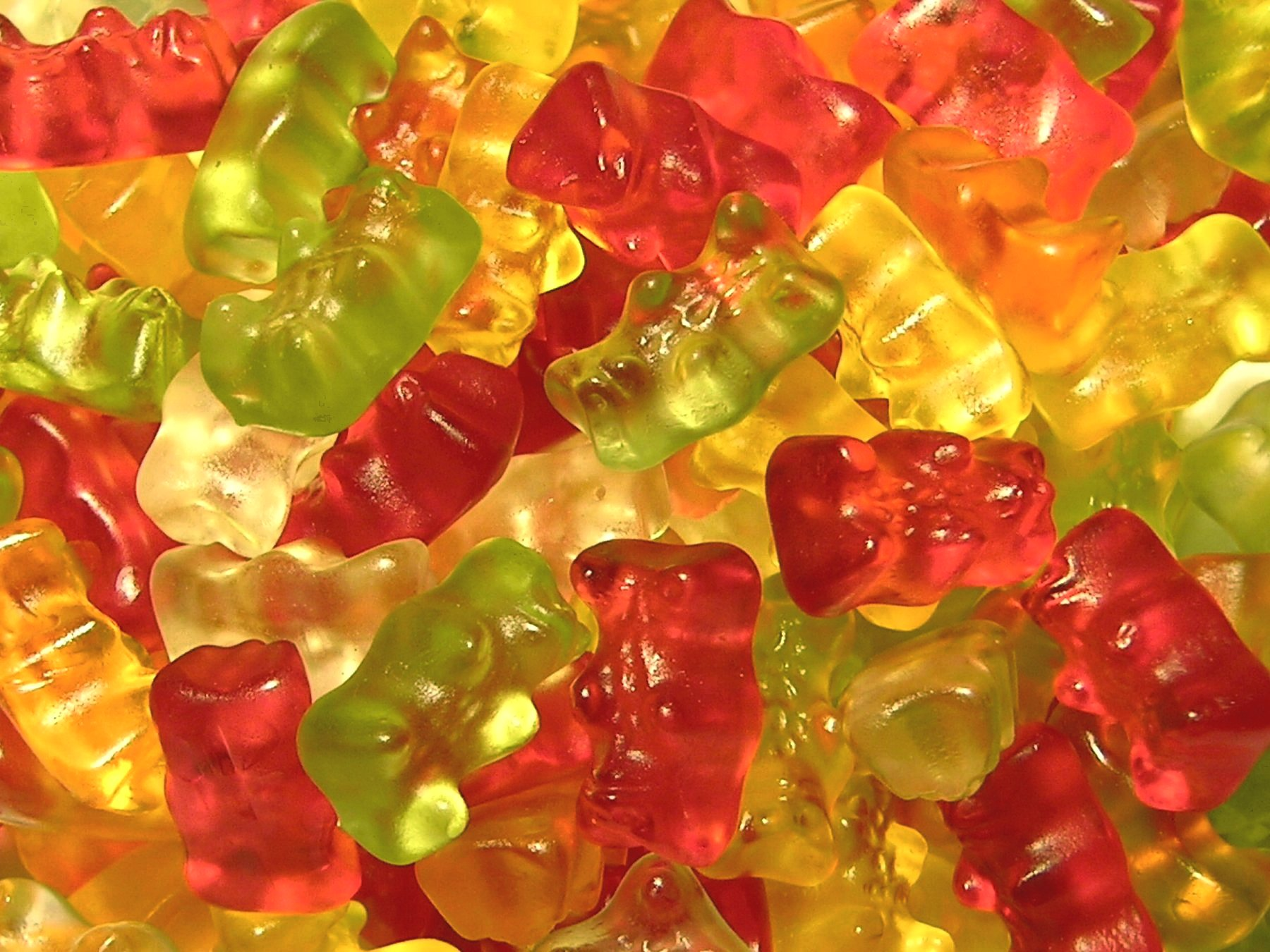
German Haribo gummy bears were the first gummy candy ever made. They are soft and chewy.

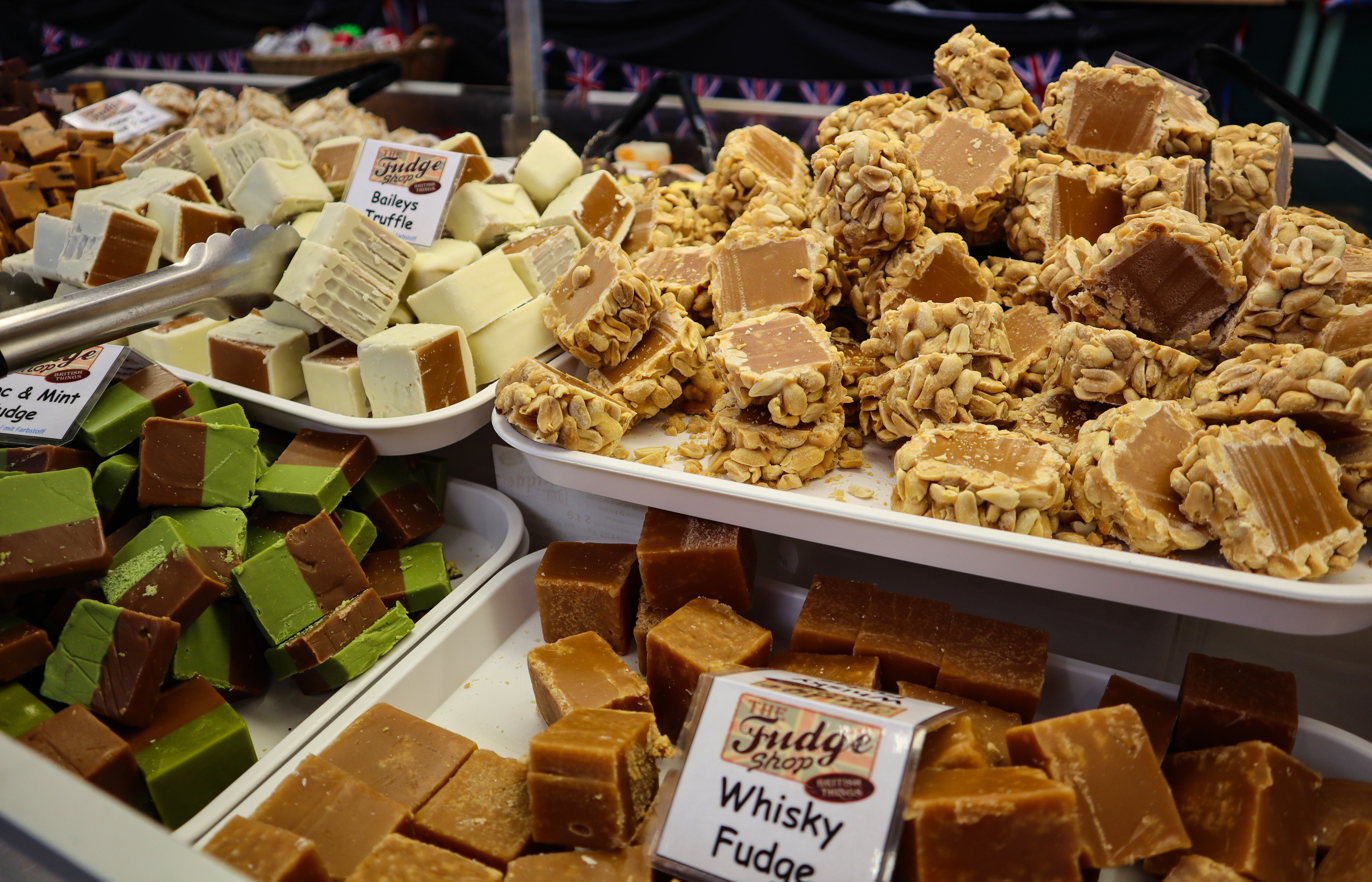
Fudge is a type of sugar candy that is made by mixing and heating sugar, butter and milk.

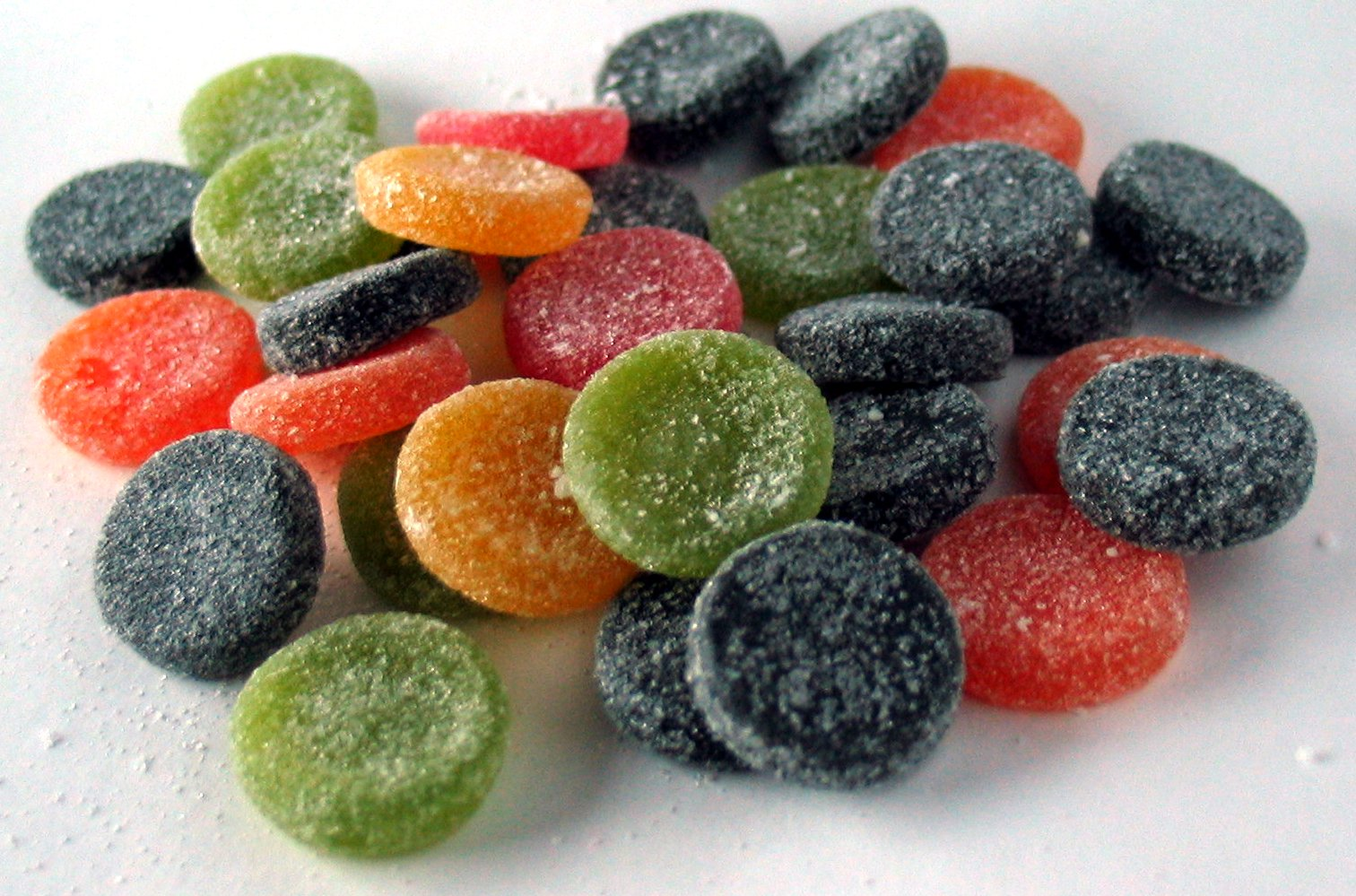
Pantteri is a soft, chewy Finnish sugar candy. The colored ones are fruity, while black are salmiakki (salty licorice-flavored).

Chocolate is sometimes treated as a separate branch of confectionery. In the confectionery, chocolate candies like chocolate candy bars and chocolate truffles are included, but hot chocolate or other cocoa-based drinks are excluded, as is candy made from white chocolate. When chocolate is treated as a separate branch, it also includes confections whose classification is otherwise difficult, being neither exactly candies nor exactly baked goods, like chocolate-dipped foods, tarts with chocolate shells, and chocolate-coated cookies.

Comparison of chocolate types

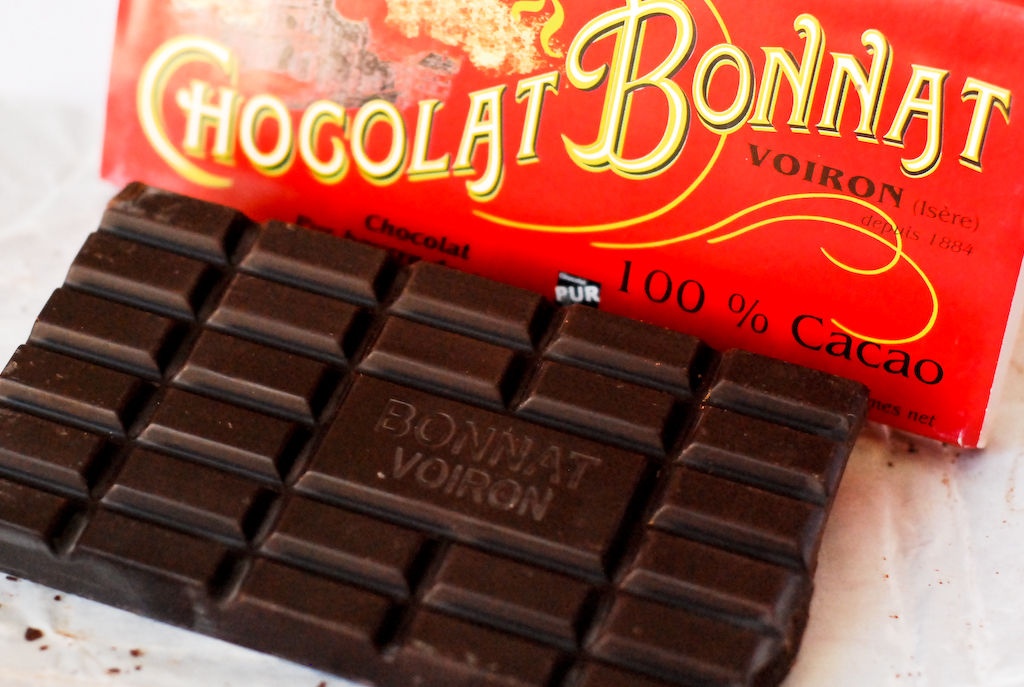
Unsweetened baking chocolate contains no sugar.

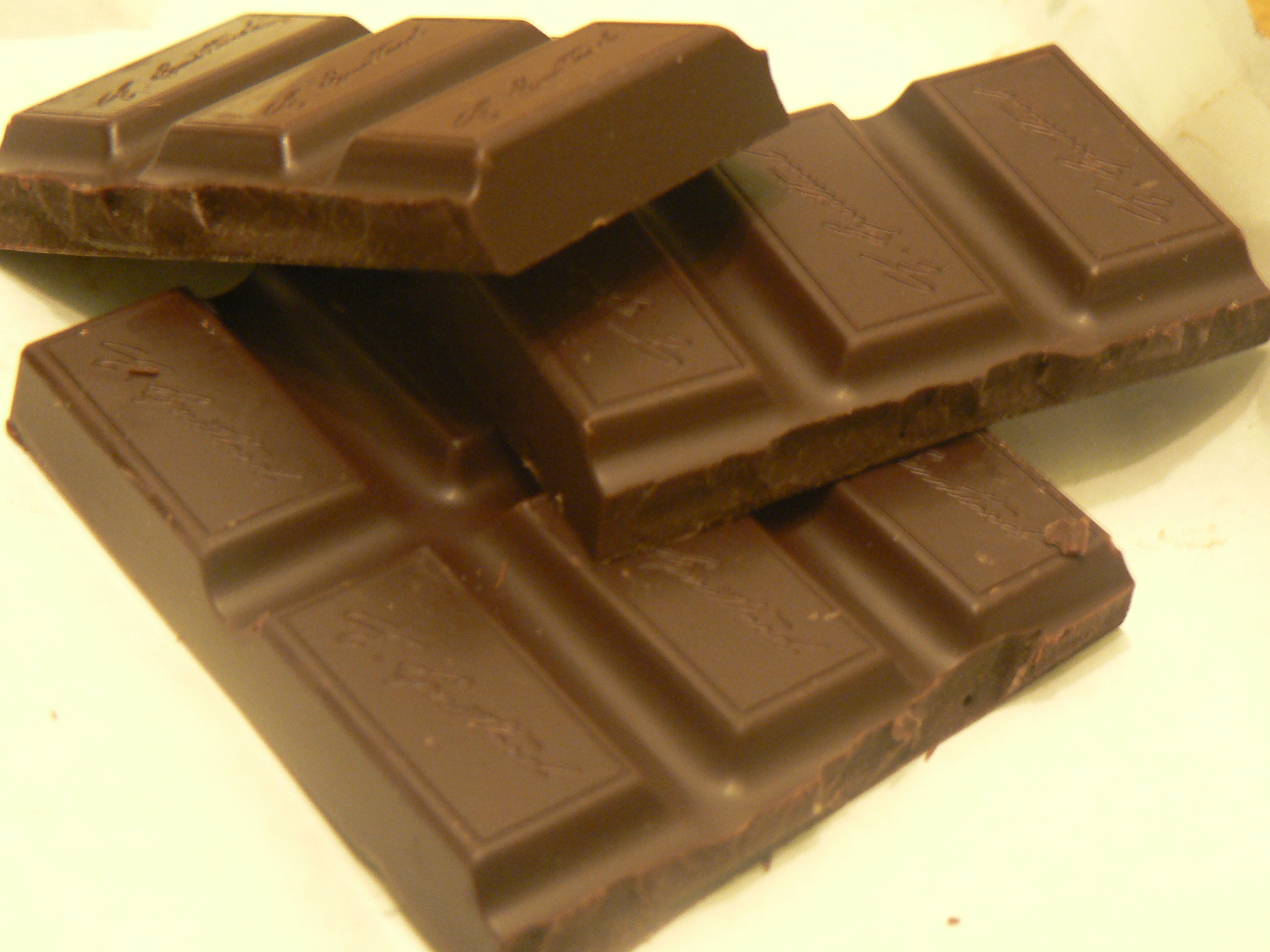
Bittersweet or dark chocolate contains some sugar.

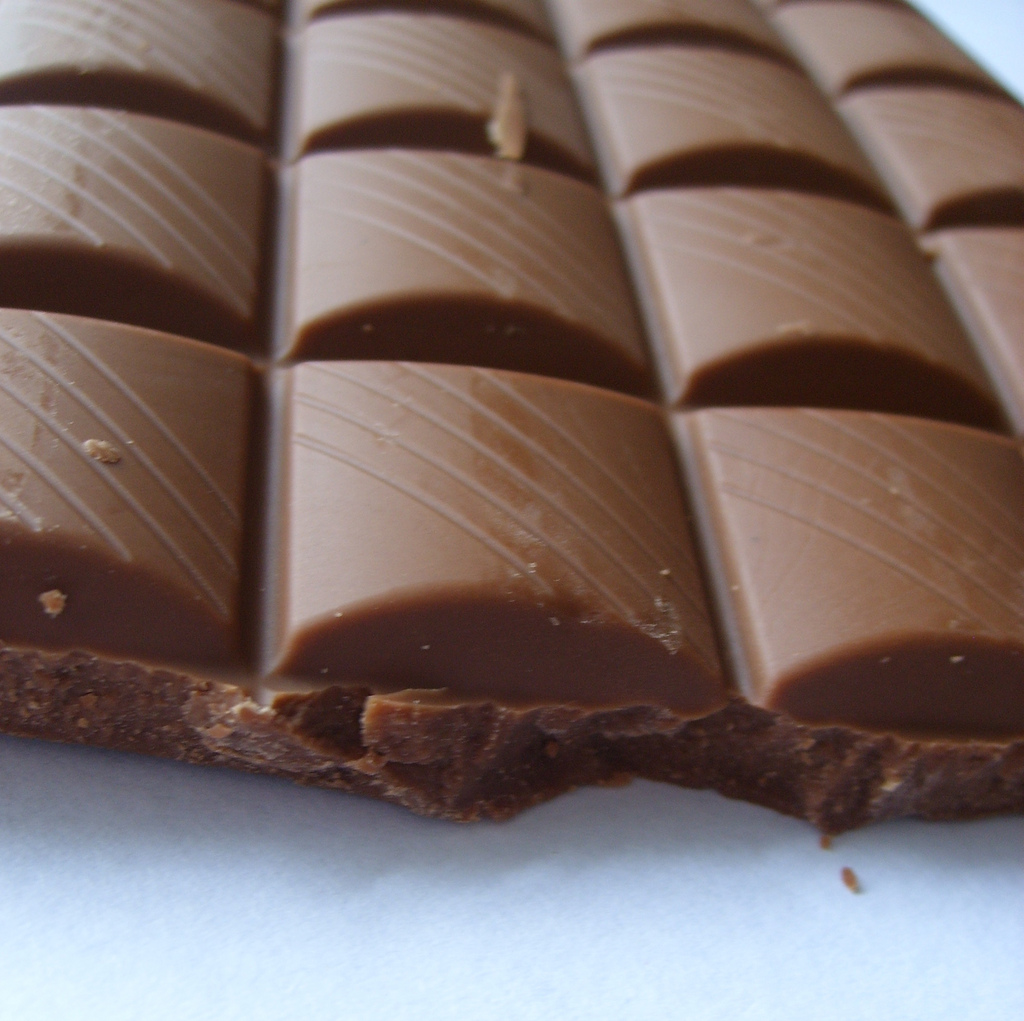
Milk chocolate contains milk and a lower amount of chocolate liquor.

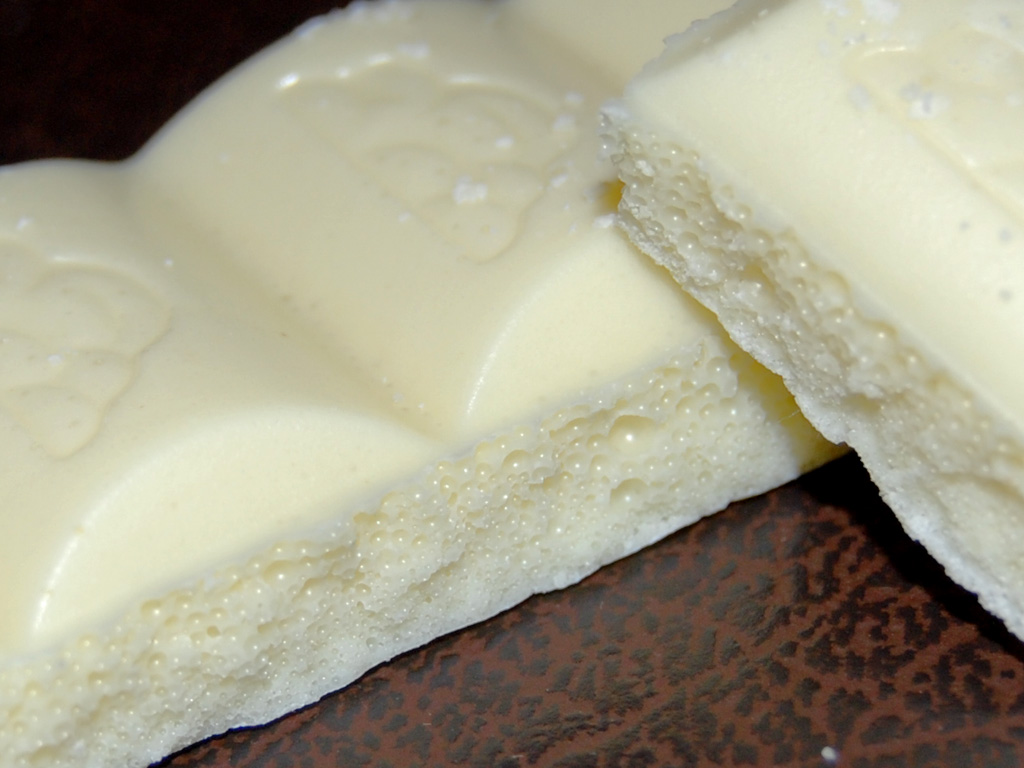
Because white chocolate contains exclusively cocoa butter instead of liquor, it is classified as sugar confectionery instead of chocolate.

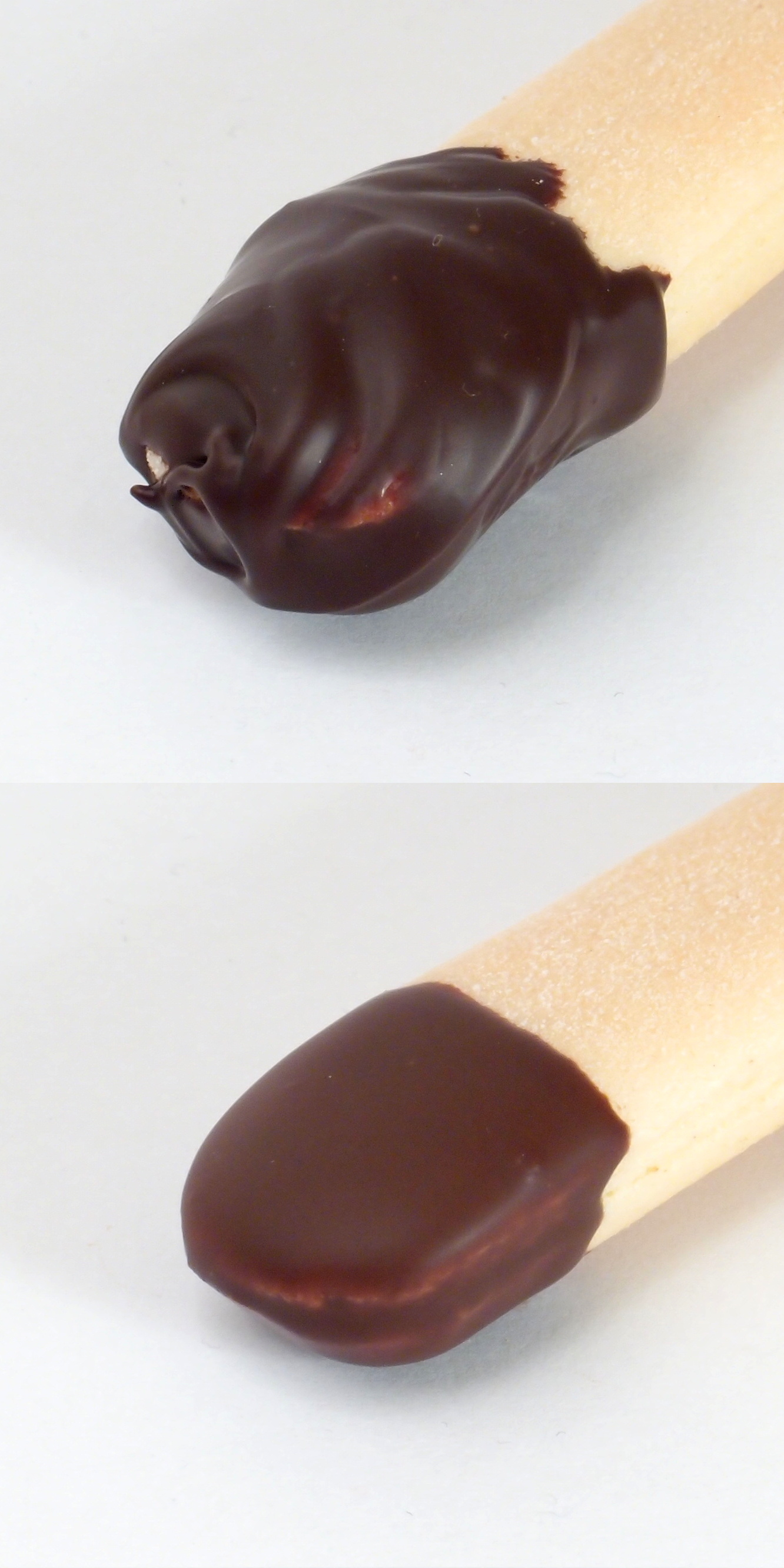
Compound chocolate is used in place of pure chocolate to reduce costs.

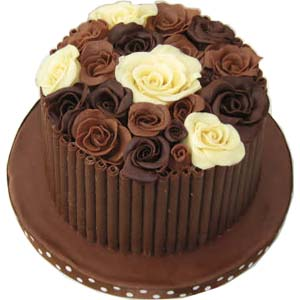
Flowers made from modeling chocolate.

== Production ==
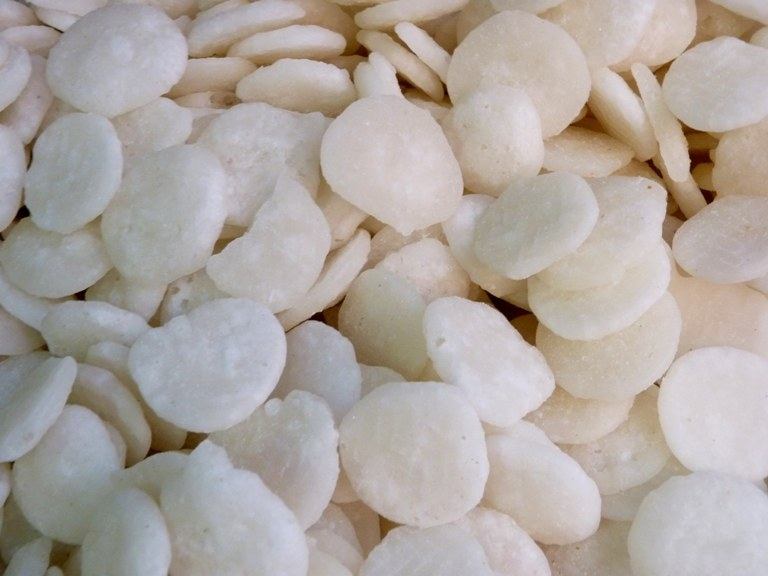
Batasha is one of the many traditional candies found in South Asia. Flavored varieties include nuts and mint

Sugar candy is made by dissolving sugar in water or milk to form a syrup, which is boiled until it reaches the desired concentration or starts to caramelize. Candy comes in a wide variety of textures, from soft and chewy to hard and brittle. The texture of candy depends on the ingredients and the temperatures that the candy is processed at.

The final texture of sugar candy depends on the concentration of sugar. As the syrup is heated, it boils, water evaporates, sugar concentration increases and the boiling point rises. A given temperature corresponds to a particular sugar concentration. These are called sugar stages. In general, higher temperatures and greater sugar concentrations result in hard, brittle candies, and lower temperatures result in softer candies. Once the syrup reaches 171 °C (340 °F) or higher, the sucrose molecules break down into many simpler sugars, creating an amber-colored substance known as caramel. Caramel is confused with caramel candy, although it is the candy's main flavoring.

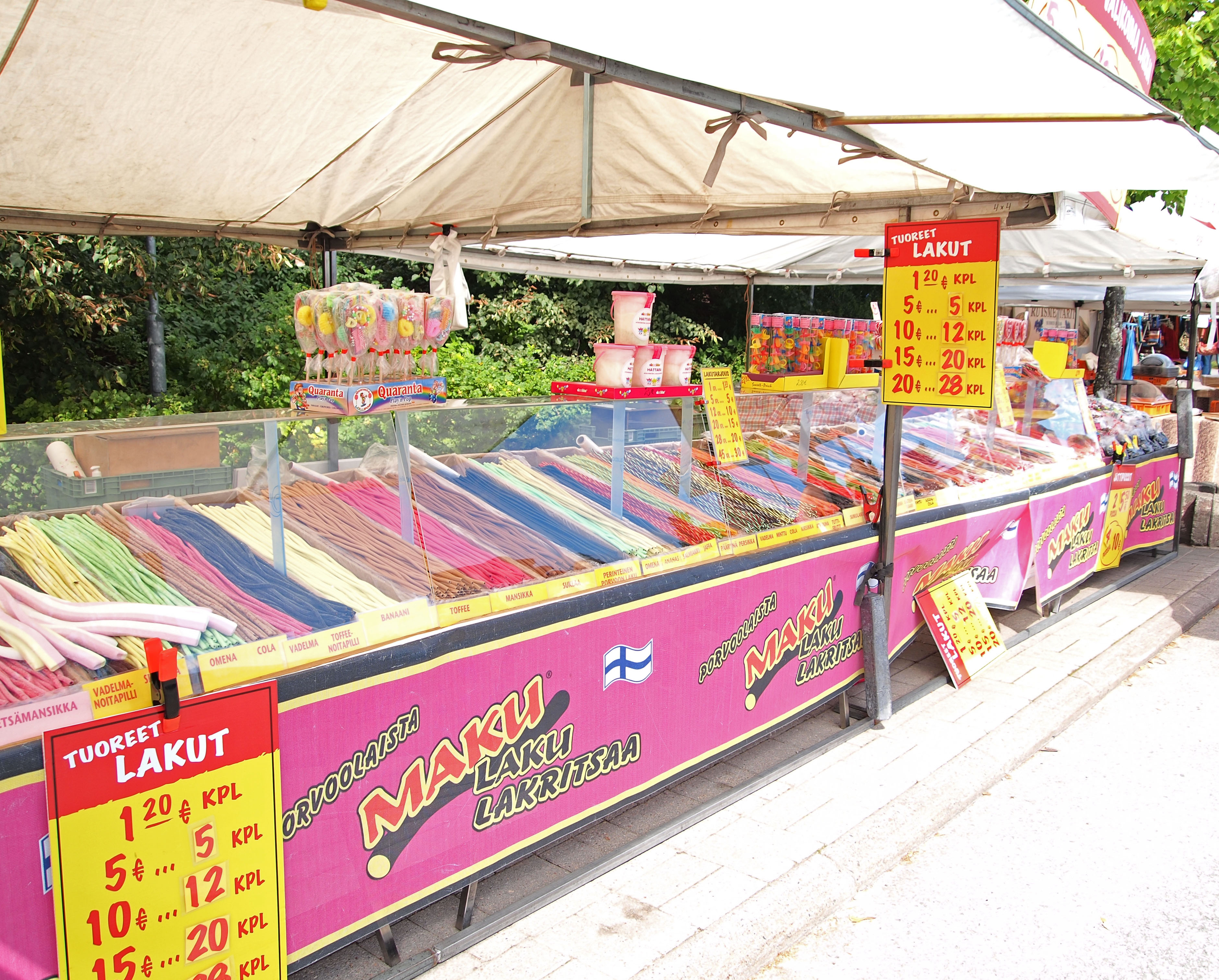
Licorice is a candy flavored with the extract of the roots of the licorice plant. It is popular in Finland.

Most candies are made commercially. The industry relies significantly on trade secret protection, because candy recipes cannot be copyrighted or patented effectively, but are very difficult to duplicate exactly. Seemingly minor differences in the machinery, temperature, or timing of the candy-making process can cause noticeable differences in the final product.

== Packaging ==
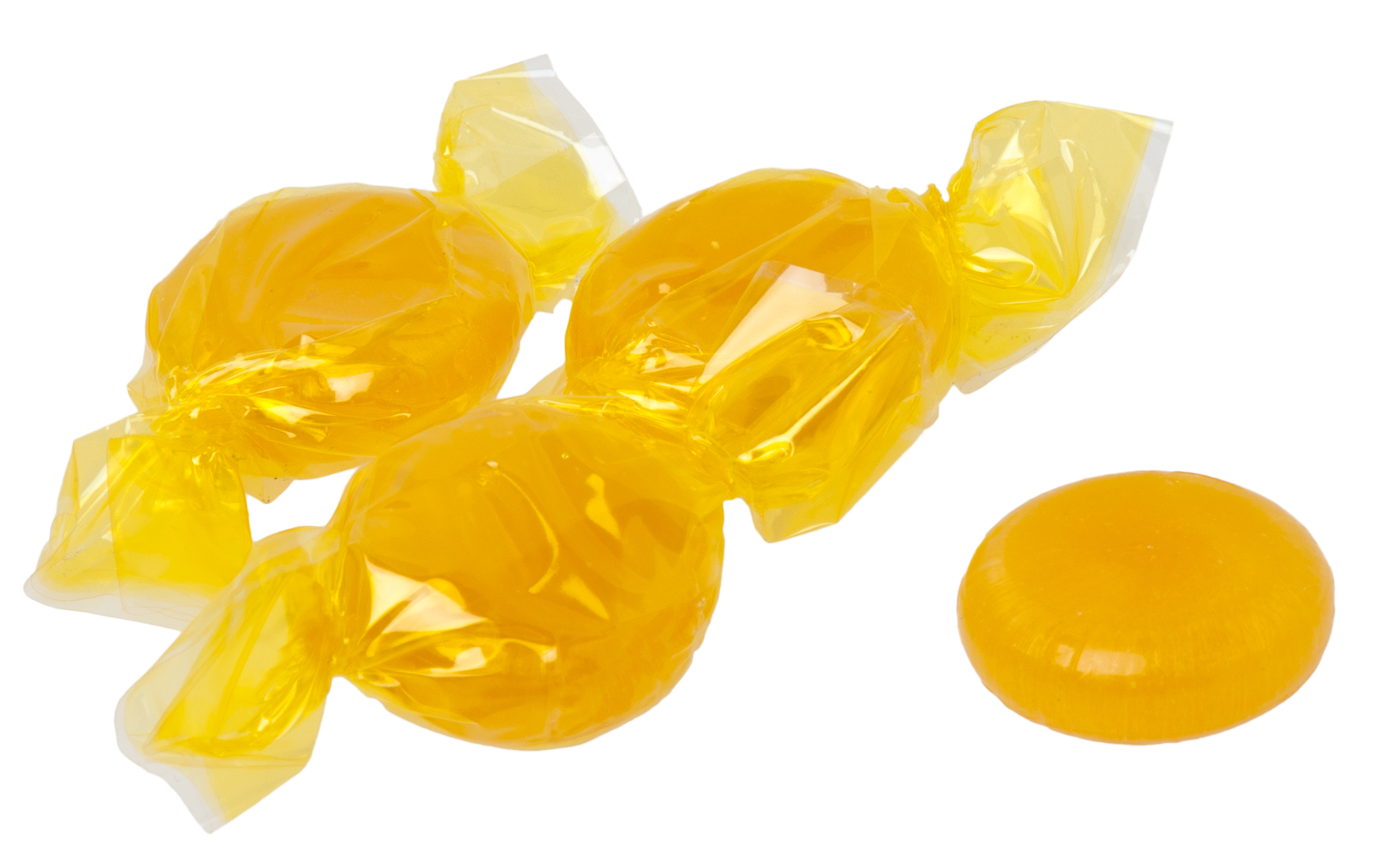
Individually wrapped butterscotch candies.

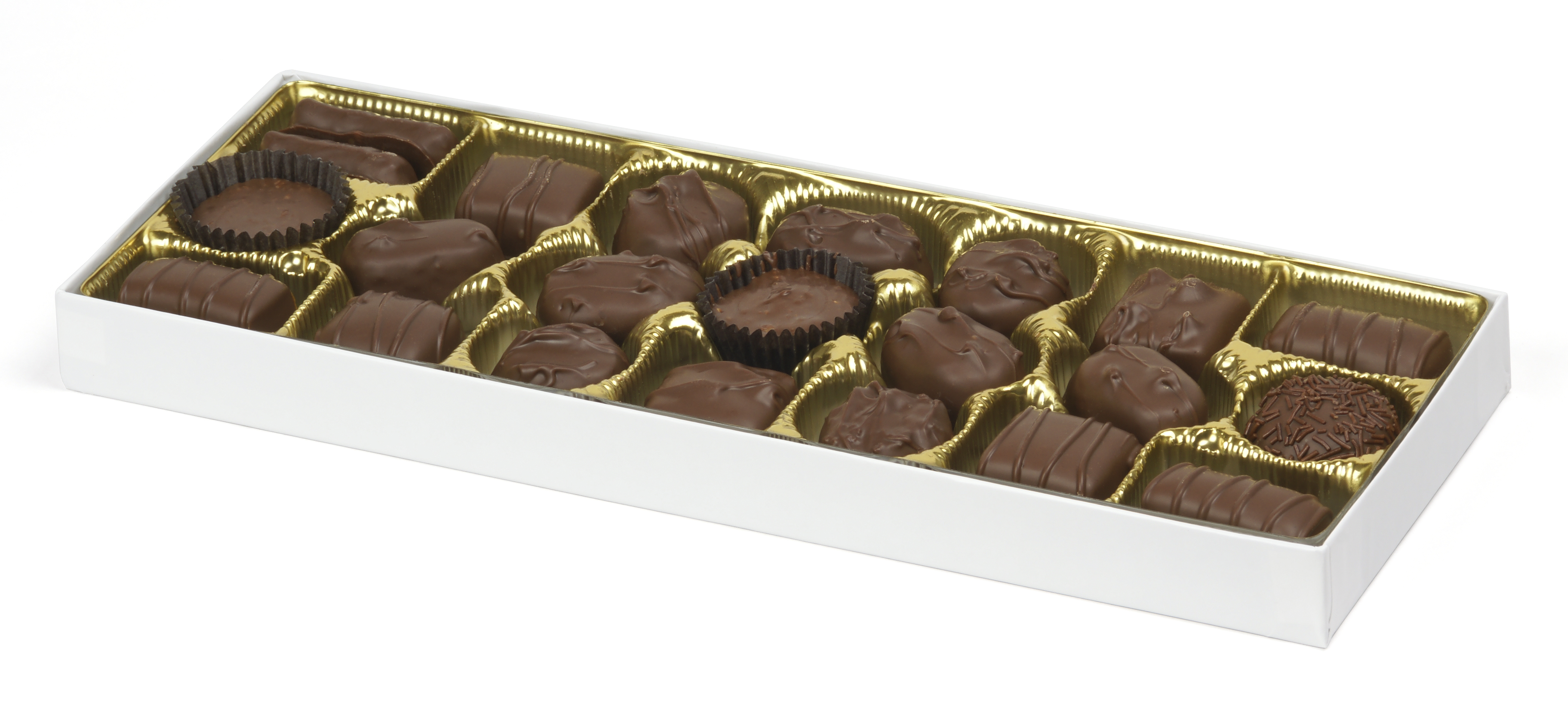
A box of chocolates, usually given as a gift.

Candy wrapper or sweets wrapper is a common term for this packaging.

=== Purposes of packaging ===
Packaging preserves aroma and flavor and eases shipping and dispensation. Wax paper seals against air, moisture, dust, and germs, while cellophane is valued by packagers for its transparency and resistance to grease, odors and moisture. In addition, it is often resealable. Polyethylene is another form of film sealed with heat, and this material is often used to make bags in bulk packaging. Plastic wraps are also common. Aluminum foils wrap chocolate bars and prevent a transfer of water vapor while being lightweight, non-toxic and odor proof. Vegetable parchment lines boxes of high-quality confections like gourmet chocolates. Cardboard cartons are less common, though they offer many options concerning thickness and movement of water and oil.

Packages are often sealed with a starch-based adhesive derived from tapioca, potato, wheat, sago, or sweet potato. Occasionally, glues are made from the bones and skin of cattle and hogs for a stronger and more flexible product, but this is not as common because of the expense.

=== History ===
Prior to the 1900s, candy was commonly sold unwrapped from carts in the street, where it was exposed to dirt and insects. By 1914, there were some machines to wrap gum and stick candies, but this was not the common practice. After the polio outbreak in 1916, unwrapped candies garnered widespread censure because of the dirt and germs. At the time, only upscale candy stores used glass jars. With advancements in technology, wax paper was adopted, and foil and cellophane were imported to the U.S. from France by DuPont in 1925. Necco packagers were one of the first companies to package without human touch. Kiosks and vending machines were introduced around the beginning of the 20th century.

Candy packaging played a role in its adoption as the most popular treat given away during trick-or-treating for Halloween in the US. In the 1940s, most treats were homemade. During the 1950s, small, individually wrapped candies were recognized as convenient and inexpensive. By the 1970s, after widely publicized but largely false stories of poisoned candy myths circulating in the popular press, factory-sealed packaging with a recognizable name brand on it became a sign of safety.

=== Marketing and design ===
Packaging helps market the product as well. Manufacturers know that candy must be hygienic and attractive to customers. In the children's market quantity, novelty, large size and bright colors are the top sellers. Many companies redesign the packaging to maintain consumer appeal.

== Shelf life ==
Because of its high sugar concentration, bacteria are not usually able to grow in candy. As a result, the shelf life is longer for candy than for many other foods. Most candies can be safely stored in their original packaging at room temperature in a dry, dark cupboard for months or years. As a rule, the softer the candy or the damper the storage area, the sooner it goes stale.

Shelf life considerations with most candies are focused on appearance, taste, and texture, rather than about the potential for food poisoning; that is, old candy may not look appealing or taste very good, even though it is very unlikely to make the eater sick. Candy can be made unsafe by storing it in warm, moist areas that are conducive to mold growth. Typical recommendations are these:

- Hard candy may last indefinitely in good storage conditions.
- Dark chocolate lasts up to two years.
- Milk chocolates and caramels usually become stale after about one year.
- Soft or creamy candies, like candy corn, may last 8 to 10 months in ideal conditions.
- Chewing gum and gumballs may stay fresh as long as 8 months after manufacture.

== Nutrition ==
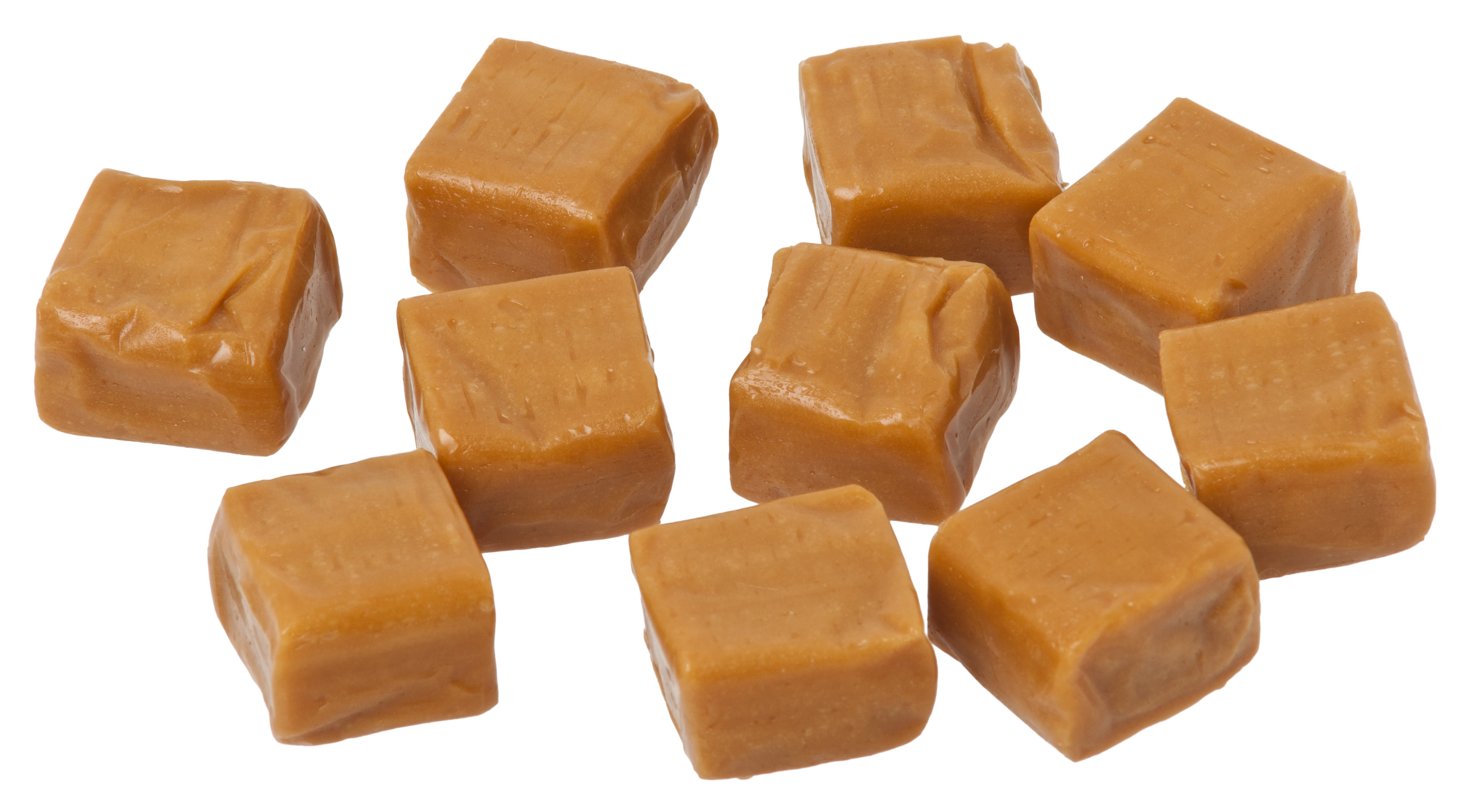
Caramels, candy made from butter, milk and sugar, have little nutritional value.

Most sugar candies are defined in US law as a food of minimal nutritional value.

Even in a culture that eats sweets frequently, candy is not a significant source of nutrition or food energy for most people. The average American eats about 1.1 kg (2.5 pounds) of sugar or similar sweeteners each week, but almost 95% of that sugar—all but about 70 grams (2.5 ounces)—comes from non-candy sources, especially soft drinks and processed foods.

=== Meal replacements ===
Candy is considered a source of empty calories, because it provides little or no nutritional value beyond food energy. At the start of the 20th century, when undernutrition was a serious problem, especially among poor and working-class people, and when nutrition science was a new field, the high calorie content was promoted as a virtue. Researchers suggested that candy, especially candy made with milk and nuts, was a low-cost alternative to normal meals. To get the food energy necessary for a day of labor, candy might cost half as much as eggs. During the 1920s and 1930s, candy bars selling for five cents were often marketed as replacements for lunch.

At the 1904 World Fair, the Quaker Oats Company made a candy-coated puffed cereal, a wheat-based product similar to Cracker Jack's candy-coated popcorn. The product concept was re-introduced unsuccessfully in 1939 by another business as Ranger Joe, the first pre-sweetened, candy-coated breakfast cereal. Post Foods introduced their own version in 1948, originally called Happy Jax and later Sugar Crisp. They marketed it as both a replacement for unsweetened breakfast cereals and also for eating as a snack or as candy, using three animated cartoon bears as the mascots: Candy, Handy, and Dandy. The early slogans said, "As a cereal it's dandy—for snacks it's so handy—or eat it like candy!"

In more recent times, a variety of snack bars have been marketed. These include bars that are intended as meal replacements as well as snack bars that are marketed as having nutritional advantages when compared to candy bars, such as granola bars. However, the actual nutritional value is often not very different from candy bars, except for usually a higher sodium content, and the flavors (most popularly, chocolate, fudge, and caramel) and the presentation mimic candy bars.

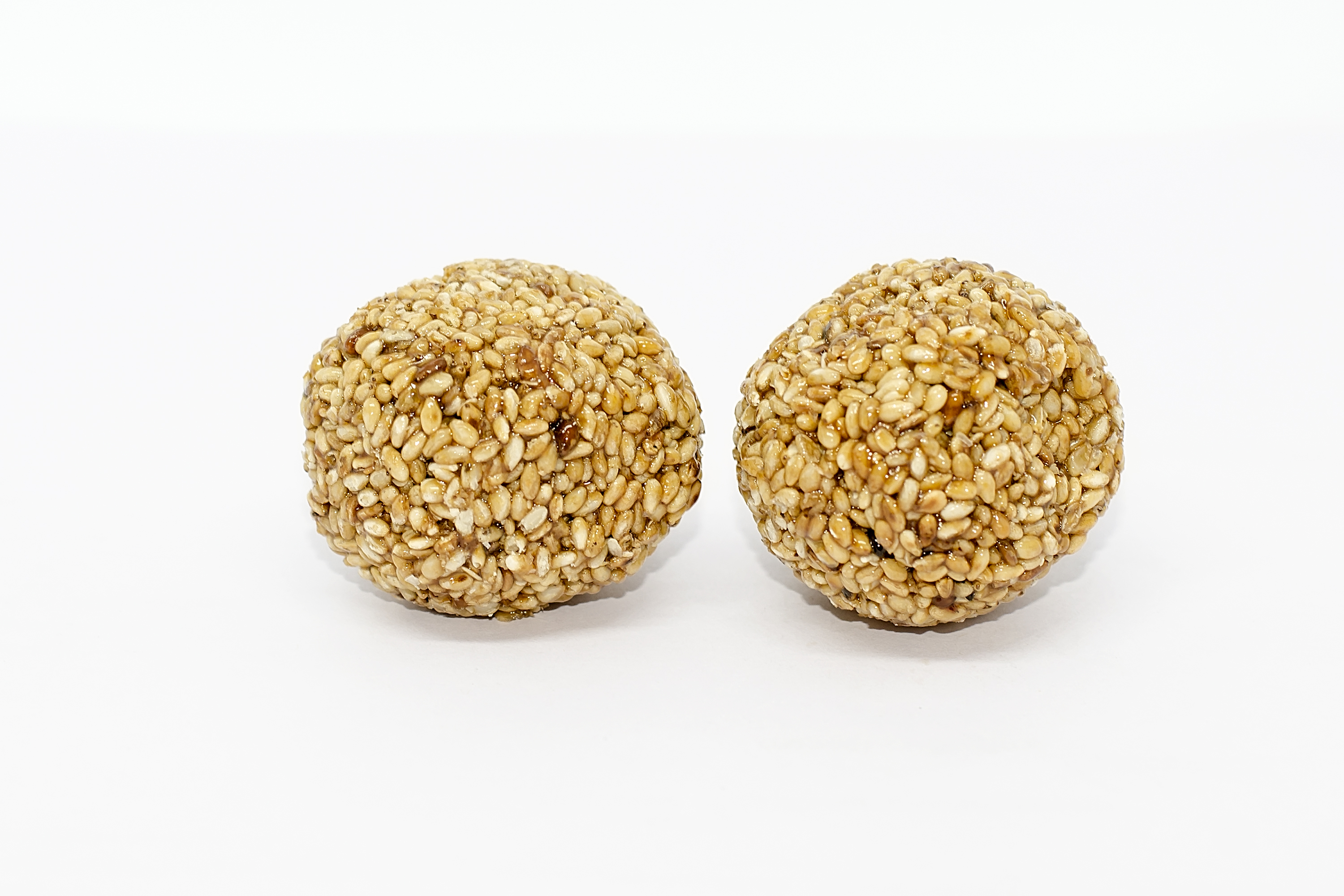
Sesame seed balls

Among the Bengali people, candy may be eaten for an entire meal, especially during festivals. Candy may also be offered to vegetarian guests in lieu of fish or meat dishes in India.

=== Vegetarianism ===
Most candy contains no meat or other animal parts, and many contain no milk or other animal products. Some candy, including marshmallows and gummy bears, contains gelatin derived from animal collagen, a protein found in skin and bones, and is thus avoided by vegans and some vegetarians. "Kosher gelatin" is also unsuitable for vegetarians and vegans, as it is derived from fish bones. Other substances, such as agar, pectin, starch and gum arabic may also be used as setting and gelling agents, and can be used in place of gelatin.

Other ingredients commonly found in candy that are not suitable for vegetarian or vegan diets include carmine, a red dye made from cochineal beetles, and confectioner's glaze, which contains shellac, a resin excreted by female lac bugs.

== Health effects ==
=== Cavities ===
Candy generally contains sugar, which is a key environmental factor in the formation of dental caries (cavities). Several types of bacteria commonly found in the mouth consume sugar, particularly Streptococcus mutans. When these bacteria metabolize the sugar found in most candies, juice, or other sugary foods, they produce acids in the mouth that demineralize the tooth enamel and can lead to dental caries. Heavy or frequent consumption of high-sugar foods, especially lollipops, sugary cough drops, and other sugar-based candies that stay in the mouth for a long time, increases the risk of tooth decay. Candies that also contain enamel-dissolving acids, such as acid drops, increase the risk. Cleaning the teeth and mouth shortly after eating any type of sugary food, and allowing several hours to pass between eating such foods, reduces the risk and improves oral health.

The link between candy and caries was formally identified through the Vipeholm experiments, where intellectually disabled people were fed copious amounts of candy and were found to develop poor dental health. The experiments are today considered to have violated multiple principles of medical ethics.

A 1959 Swedish dental health campaign encouraged people to reduce the risk of dental problems by limiting consumption of candy to once a week. The slogan, "All the sweets you want, but only once a week", started a tradition of buying candy every Saturday, called lördagsgodis (literally "Saturday candy"). However, per capita candy consumption in Sweden rose from about 10 to 15 kg (22 to 33 lb) per year after self-service pick-and-mix candy was introduced in the 1980s, and Swedes have been the world's largest consumers of candy since at least 2009.

=== Glycemic index ===
Most candy, particularly low-fat and fat-free candy, has a high glycemic index (GI), which means that it causes a rapid rise in blood sugar levels after ingestion. This is chiefly a concern for people with diabetes, but could also be dangerous to the health of non-diabetics.

Diets with a high glycemic index are associated with an increased risk of developing type 2 diabetes and cardiovascular disease.

=== Contamination ===
Some kinds of candy have been contaminated with an excessive amount of lead in it. Claims of contamination have been made since shortly after industrial-scale candy factories began producing candy in the mid-19th century, although these early claims were rarely true.

Contamination by infectious agents such as virus or bacteria is unlikely through sweets, including unwrapped sweets. This is in part because bacteria can not replicate in the very dry and sweet environment of candy.

=== Choking deaths ===
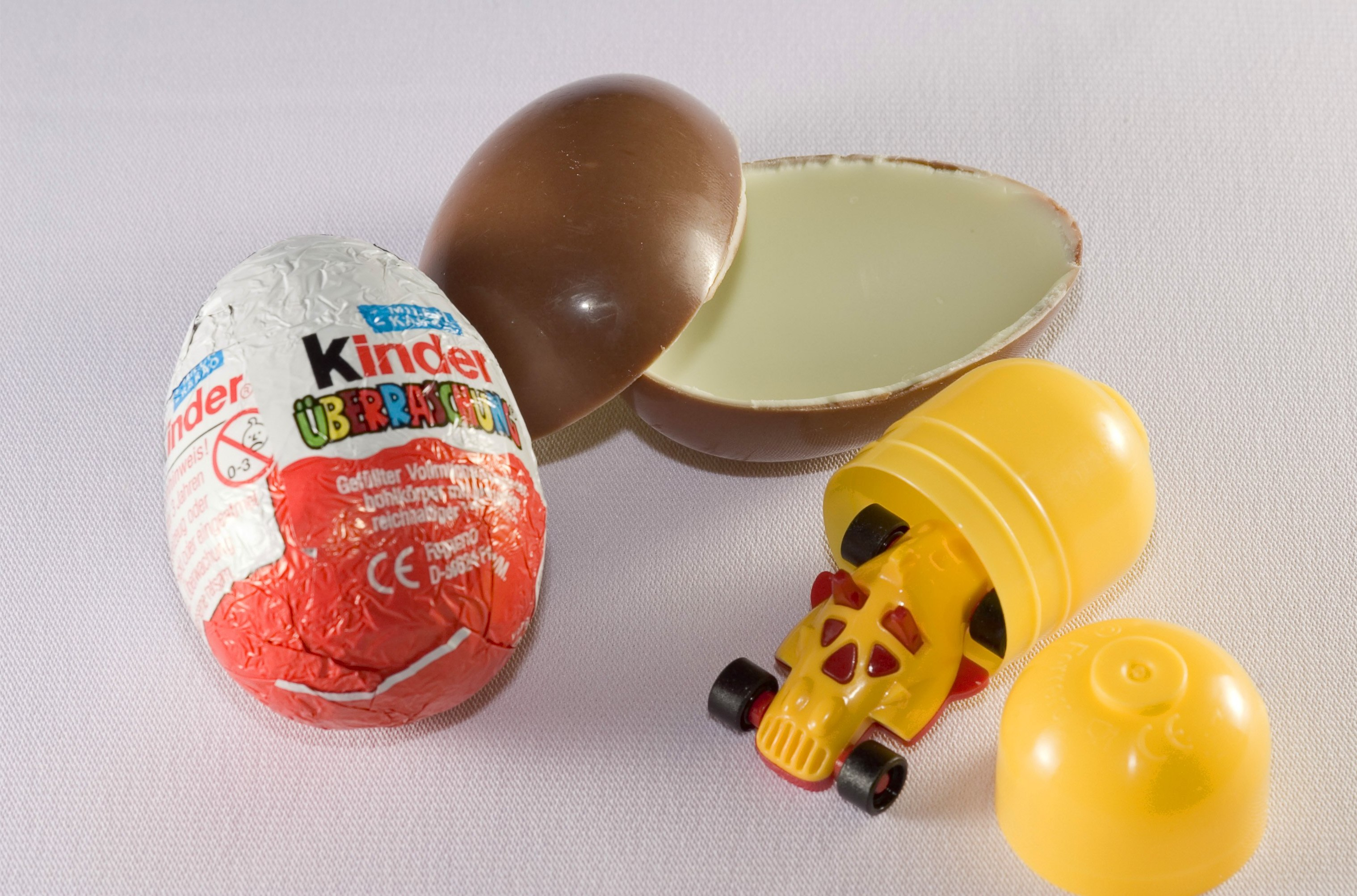
Candies with plastic toys inside can create a choking hazard

Hard and round candies are a cause of choking deaths in children. Some types of candy, such as Lychee Mini Fruity Gels, have been associated with so many choking deaths that their import or manufacture is banned by select countries.

Non-nutritive toy products such as chocolate eggs containing packaging with a toy inside are banned from sale in the US. If the material attached to confectionery has a function and will not cause any injury to the consumer, it is allowed to be marketed. In the EU, however, the Toy Safety Directive 2009/48/EC specifies that toys contained in food only need separate packaging that cannot be swallowed.

== Sales ==
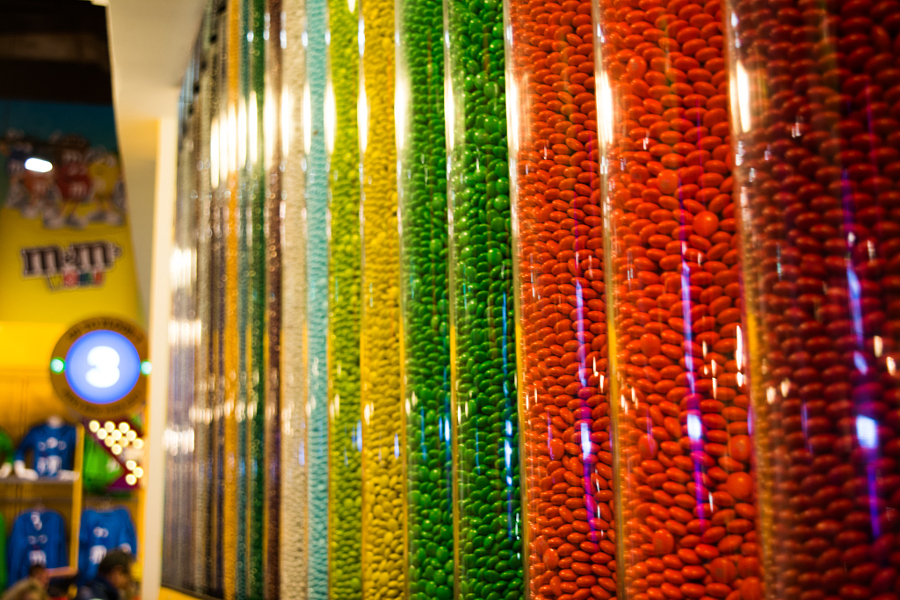
All assorted M&M candies at New York shop

Global sales of candies were estimated to have been approximately US$118 billion in 2012. In the United States, $2 is spent on chocolate for every $1 spent on non-chocolate candy.

Because each culture varies in how it treats foods, a food may be considered a candy in one place and a dessert in another. For example, in Western countries, baklava is served on a plate and eaten with a fork as a dessert, but in the Middle East, Northern Africa, and Eastern Europe, it is treated as a candy.

== Holidays and cultural significance ==
=== Diwali ===
Sweets have an important role in the Hindu festival of Diwali, when sweets are commonly shared among family members and friends. Certain regional sweets are associated with religious offerings; for example, Mathura peda is linked to offerings to Krishna.

=== Halloween ===
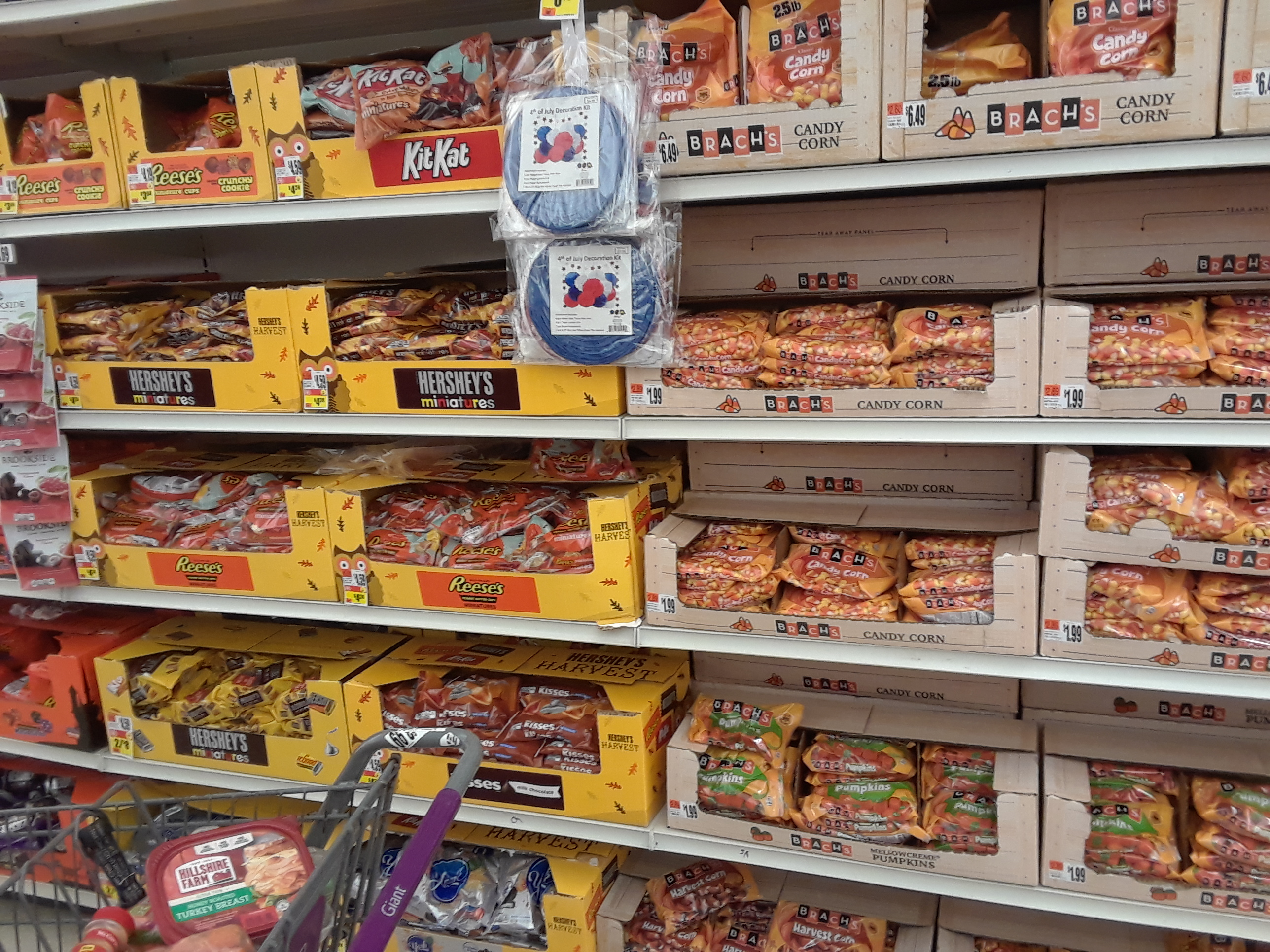
Halloween candy being sold at a supermarket in Virginia

In the United States, Canada, and the UK, going trick-or-treating, the process of going door to door to receive free candy during Halloween has become a tradition for children. The tradition originated from the All Hallows Day or All Saints Day holiday, where Christian children would pray door to door and be offered soul cakes in return. In the USA in 2025, Reese's Cups was the top chocolate Halloween candy, and Skittles were the top non-chocolate candy.

The idea of providing trick-or-treaters with candy began in the 1950s in the US, as a result of candy marketing firms. Givers would continue to make treats or package small toys and coins specifically for Halloween, with candy taking over in the 1970s. The idea that pre-packaged candy was safer for children than home made food influenced this change.

In 2025, consumer spending on Halloween candy was expected to reach $12 billion, a new record, as candy continues to be popular for the Halloween season and remains the biggest draw for participation. In October 2025, retailers reported an increase in cocoa prices was driving up the price of Halloween candy.

=== Wedding candy ===
In China, wedding candy (Chinese: 喜糖; pinyin: xǐtáng; lit. 'happy candy') is often given as a symbol of the occasion's "sweetness". However, changes in consumer habits caused by the COVID-19 pandemic challenged the wedding sweets market. Marriages in China fell during the pandemic, with 17.5% fewer marriages in Q1-Q3 of 2021 than in the same period in 2019, reducing demand for wedding confections. Additionally, growing consumer health awareness has increased the market share of fruit- and nut-based snacks over chocolates and candies. As of 2022, the wedding candy market skews toward higher-end products, such as imported chocolate and biscuits.

In Italy, sugared almonds are traditionally given as part of 'bonbonniere' or wedding favours, a practice adopted around the world.

== See also ==
- Bulk confectionery
- Candy making
- List of candies
- List of desserts
- List of top-selling candy brands
