= Swedish festivities =

List of holidays in Sweden

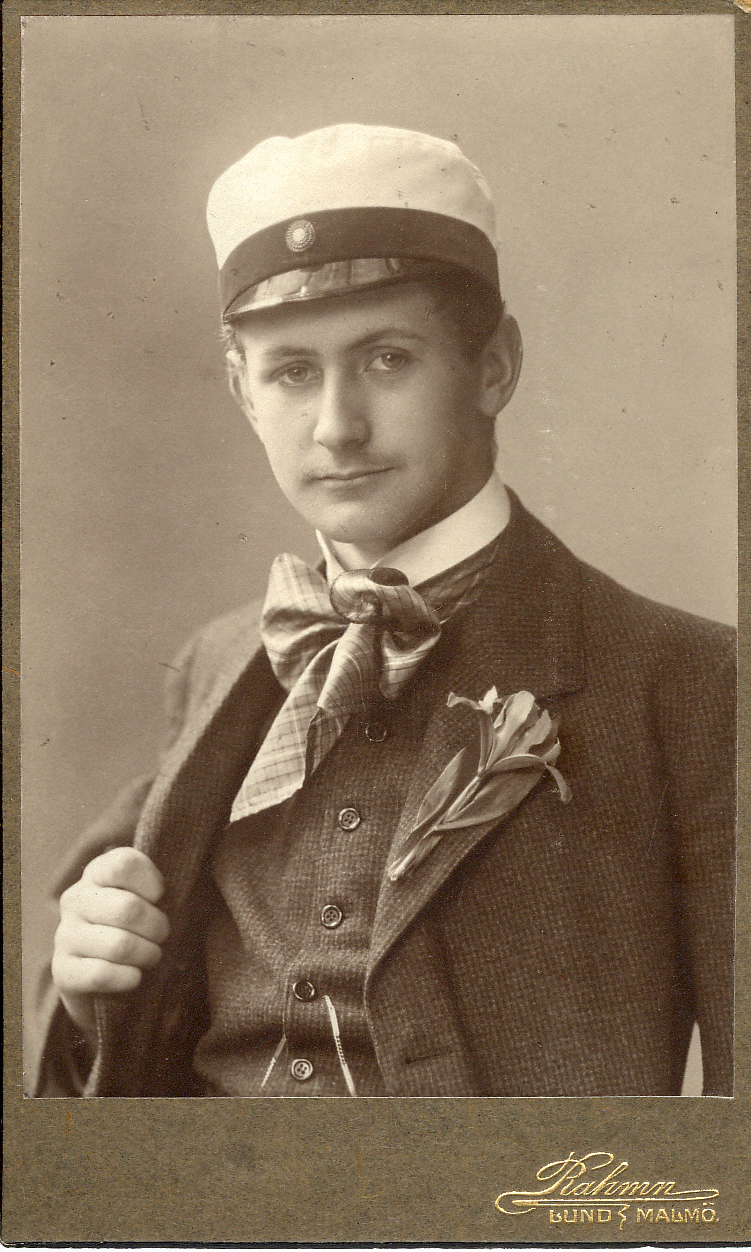
The student cap once belonged to a privileged class. Today it is worn by most Swedes at the end of secondary school.

Swedish festivities are an integral part of Swedish culture, reflecting the country's history, traditions, and seasonal changes. These celebrations can range from religious observances to secular holidays, and often incorporate unique customs and foods. Major festivities include Midsummer, Christmas (Jul), Easter (Påsk), and Walpurgis Night (Valborg), Semel day. Many Swedish festivities are closely tied to the Lutheran Church of Sweden, although participation in religious services has declined in recent years. The celebration of these holidays often involves specific rituals, traditional foods, and gatherings with family and friends, contributing to the social fabric of Swedish society.

== Life of Swedish people ==
Over 70% of Swedish people belong to the Lutheran Church of Sweden, but seldom go to church. Attendance is a bit higher among members of free churches such as Pentecostals and the Salvation Army. Christenings, weddings and funerals are usually made in church, although civil weddings are generally accepted - especially for subsequent marriages. Around half of Swedes are confirmed, usually at the age of fifteen. Other celebrations are studenten ("the student", originally studentexamen, "the student's degree") - the graduation from secondary school, and decennial birthdays.

== The week in Sweden ==
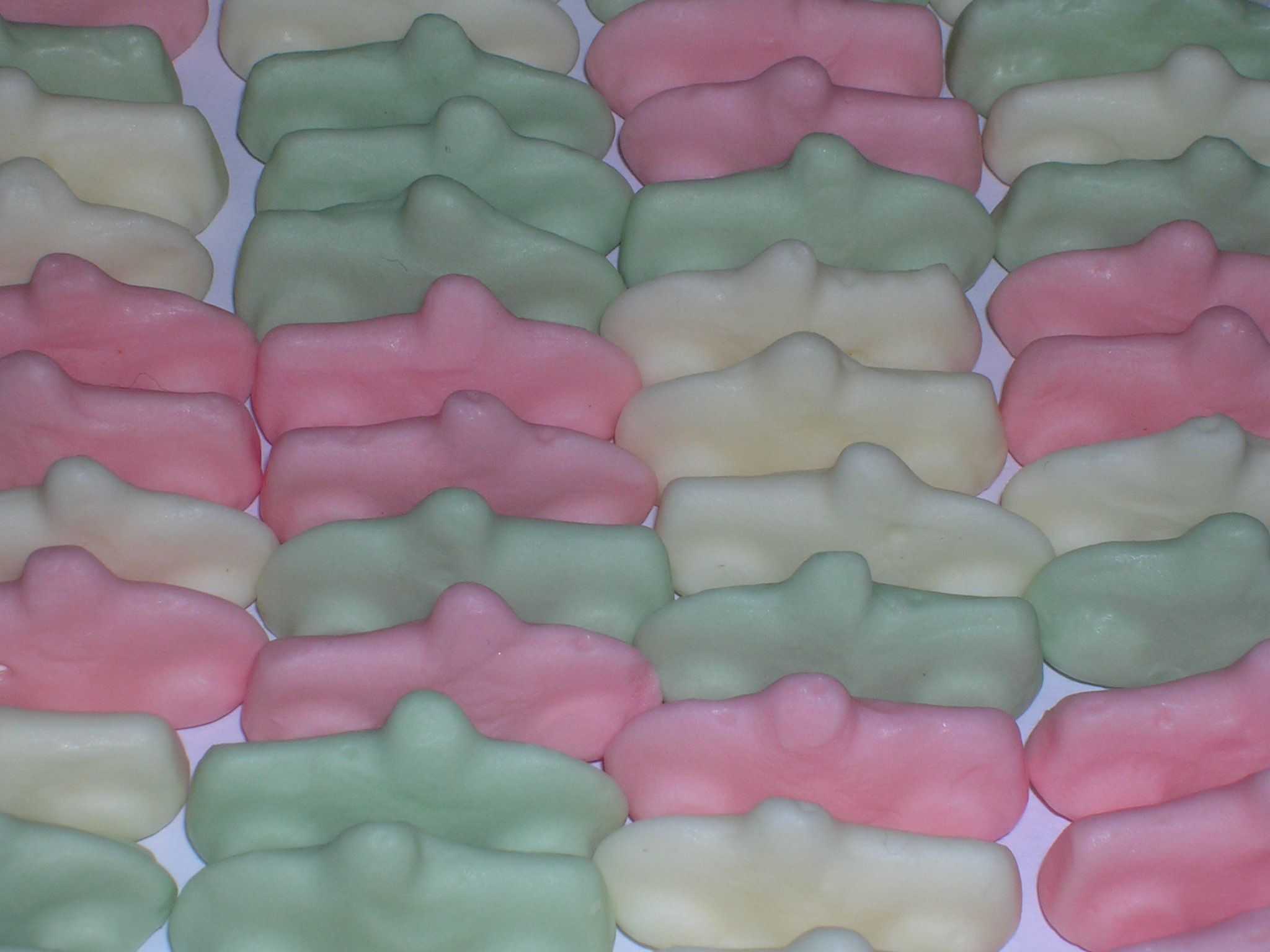
Saturday is associated with sweets.

Swedish weeks begin on Mondays. Most Swedes keep track of week numbers for long-term planning.

Sweden is one of the few countries in the world where most retail stores, at least in cities, are open all week. Laws regulating activities on Sundays were abolished during the late 20th century.

A dish which for most Swedes is seen as typical, though the tradition of it is rarely followed, for Thursdays is pea soup followed by pancakes with jam as dessert.

Many Swedish children are allowed to eat sweets only on Saturdays - lördagsgodis ("Saturday sweets"). This tradition is intended to prevent dental caries, but its history contains questionable medical ethics - it is the result of the Vipeholm experiments, in which mentally challenged patients were unwittingly used as test subjects of experiments in dental health.

Swedish alcohol habits vary greatly during the week - Swedes expect each other to be completely sober during work hours (even one beer for lunch is taboo), but many people drink heavily during weekends. See also alcohol in Sweden.

== The year in Sweden ==
Sweden, especially Norrland, can have extreme seasonal differences. This has affected the festivities, as many of them commemorate the turn of seasons. Many holiday celebrations take place on the eve - the day before the holiday proper (for instance Walpurgis night and Christmas Eve).

=== New Year celebration ===
New Year is celebrated with fireworks, starting at midnight on New Year's Day, and sparkling wine and many snacks, usually after a shellfish dinner late on New Year's Eve.

In recent years, many people start the fireworks already on New Year's Eve or even many days before. This has led to much debate, since it is not only in violation of the tradition but many people also find it disturbing or even frightening to have fireworks go off for days instead of only in the half-hour or so after midnight on New Year's night.

On New Year's Eve, Sveriges Television (SVT) shows the classical comedy sketch Dinner for One, Grevinnan och Betjänten. There are also often special shows commemorating the ending of the TV year, showing highlights from the year. TV also broadcast popular movies on this night. At midnight, SVT shows the celebration in Skansen in Stockholm, where a prominent actor reads Edvard Fredin's translation of Alfred Tennyson's Ring Out, Wild Bells On New Year's Day. SVT also used to show the British half-hour comedy The Plank and the ski jumping contest in Garmisch-Partenkirchen, but they have been withdrawn. On New Year's Day, SVT shows The New Year Concert of the Vienna Philharmonic Orchestra. The film Ivanhoe was broadcast by SVT on New Year's Day earlier, but the commercial channel TV3 has taken over the tradition.

=== Winter ===
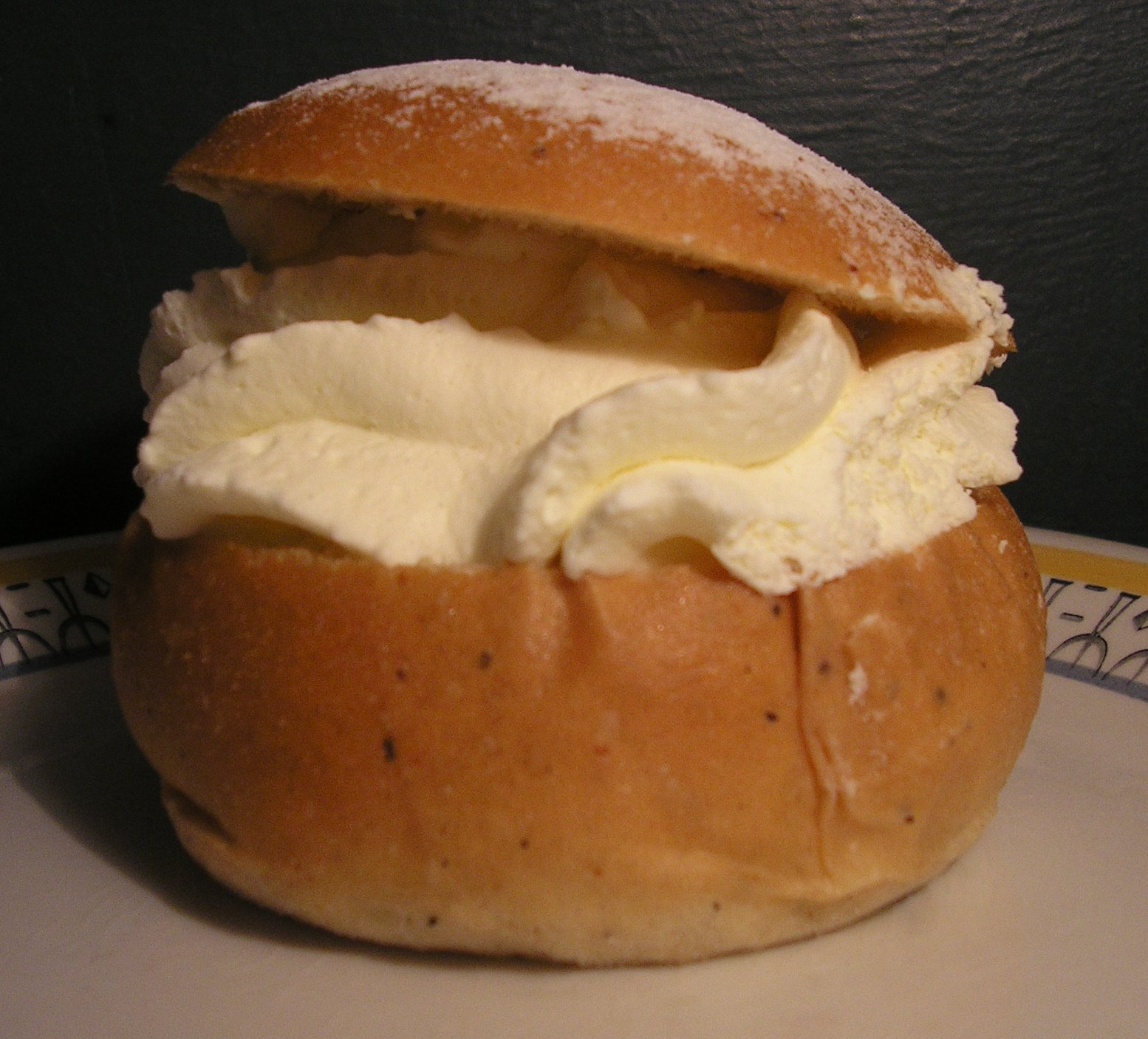
A semla, eaten from Fat Tuesday until Easter

Valentine's Day, Alla hjärtans dag, "All Hearts' Day", is recognized by merchants, but not taken very seriously.

Schools have a one-week break during February called sportlov ("sports break"). This break originated in the coke rationing of World War II, but today it is more of an incentive for exercise through winter sports. The break occurs between week 7 and 10 depending on county, to spread utilization of Swedish ski resorts.

Swedes celebrate Mardi Gras (Fat Tuesday, Fettisdagen) 41 days before Easter (rather Palm Sunday, since the fasting was forty days, Ash Wednesday to the day before Easter Saturday, Sundays not included). This is celebrated by eating a special pastry called semla. Lent is honoured by a minority of Swedes. The annual première of semla-eating has crept all the way to early January.

=== Spring ===
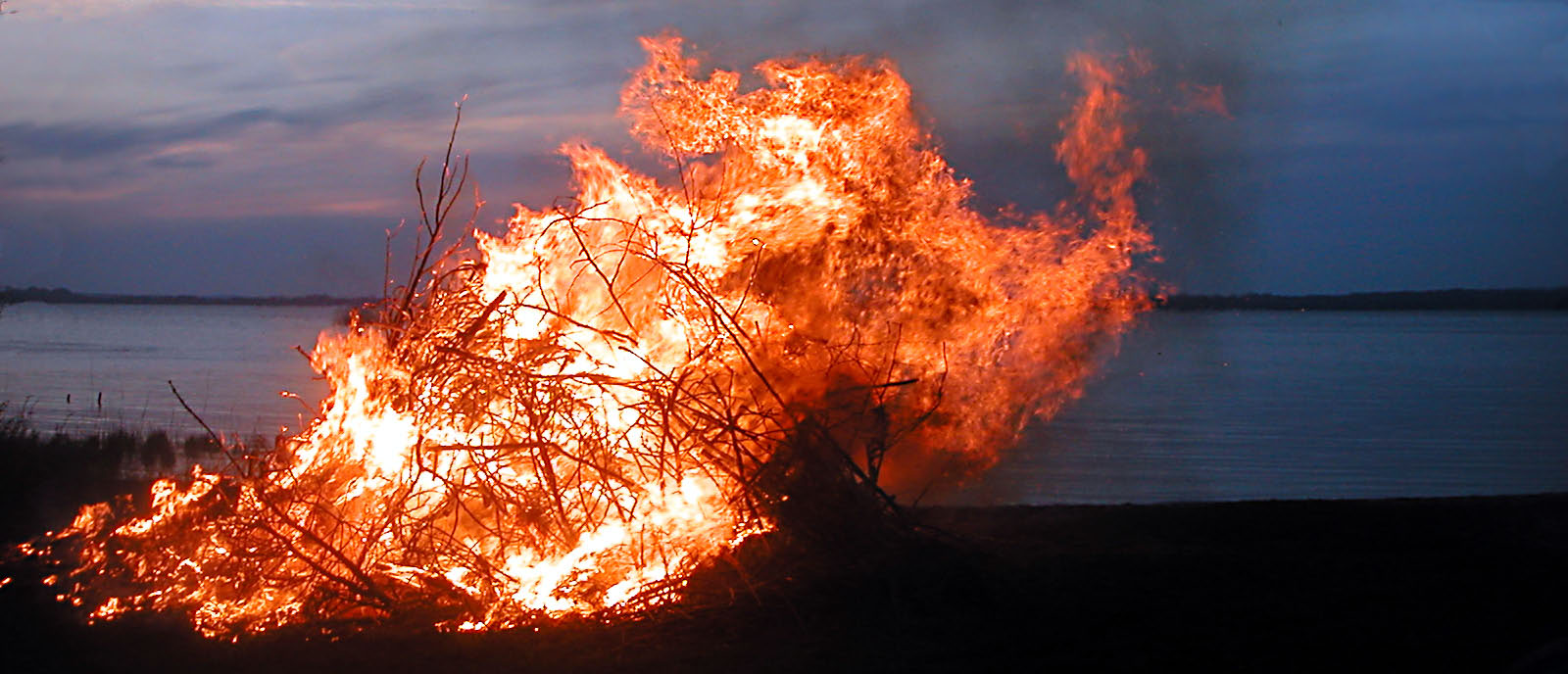
A Walpurgis fire.

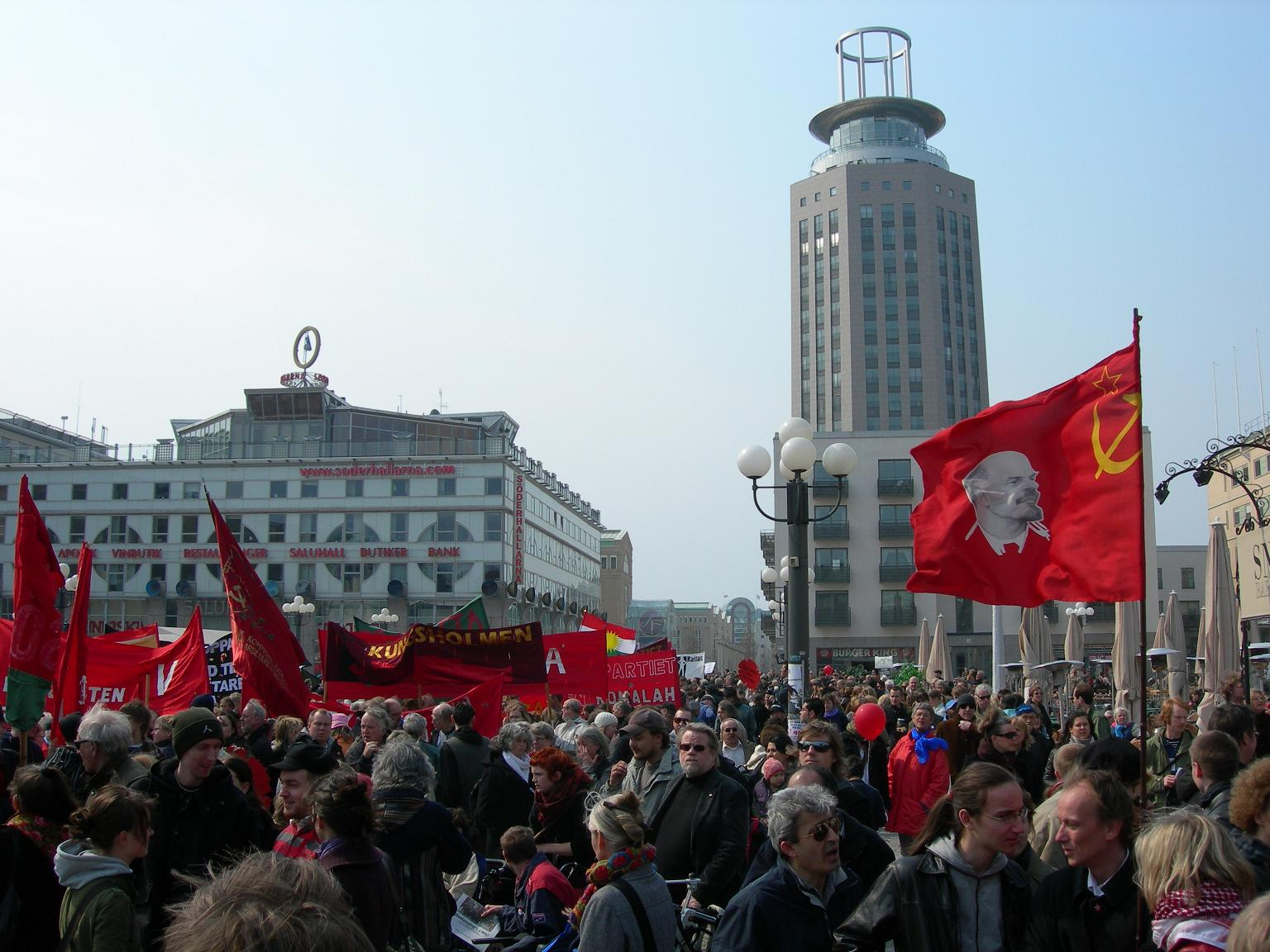
A May Day demonstration in Stockholm by the Left Party, 2006.

On the Christian holiday of Annunciation, Swedes celebrate by eating waffles, as the day is called "Waffle Day" in Sweden. This is in fact due to a misunderstanding of the phrase "vårfrudagen", meaning "Our Lady's Day", which in turn sounds like "våffeldagen", meaning "waffle day.".

Easter (påsk) is celebrated in Sweden. The belief in witches travelling to Blåkulla on Maundy Thursday (originally for a Sabbath with the Devil) is honoured by children dressing up as witches (påskkärring), knocking on the doors in the neighbourhood requesting treats (much like trick or treating during Halloween). Good Friday used to be an extraordinarily calm day when all businesses were closed to commemorate the Passion of Christ, but today it is an ordinary holiday.

It is customary to eat boiled eggs as well as chocolate eggs and other sweets during Easter. Adults hand out simple gifts in carton eggs to the children in the family. Easter decorations in the shape of chickens, Easter bunnies and witches are popular, and birch twigs decorated with colourful feathers (påskris) are popular as well.

April Fools' Day (första april) is celebrated on 1 April by playing practical jokes on friends and family. If the practical joke succeeds, you say "April, april din dumma sill, jag kan lura dig vart jag vill", which translates to "April, April you stupid herring, I can trick you wherever I want (to)".

On the last day of April, Walpurgis Night (Valborg) is celebrated throughout Sweden to celebrate the arrival of spring. This is done by igniting large bonfires and singing songs celebrating the coming of springtime. This is also an occasion when Swedish young adults, particularly university students, drink large amounts of alcohol.

May Day (första maj) is a public holiday, and is celebrated by the Swedish labour movement with demonstrations and political speeches.

Since Ascension Day, Kristi himmelfärdsdag, occurs on a Thursday, the subsequent Friday is a klämdag, "squeezed day", a day taken off from work by many Swedish people. Pentecost, (pingst) often coincides with weddings and confirmations.

=== Summer ===
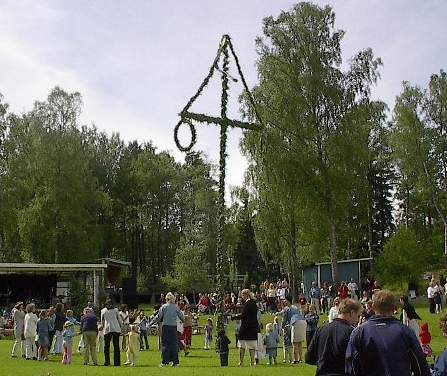
Midsummer's Eve is always on a Friday.

The Swedish National Day on June 6 is a public holiday as of 2005, but so far there are few established traditions for this day. The celebration of this day begun as the Day of the Swedish Flag, ca 1900, and the day is chosen in commemoration of the election of Gustav Vasa as King of Sweden on this date in 1523.

The second most important festivity in the Swedish calendar, or perhaps for many the most important, is Midsummer, midsommar. Midsummer's Eve is celebrated on the eve of the Friday between the 20 and 26 June. Most Swedes try upon this day to get to a place in the countryside where they can eat pickled herring, boiled potatoes and sour cream as well as strawberries and brännvin. A maypole is often erected around which, at least if there are children present at the celebration, dancing is performed. Houses are often decorated in birch twigs.

The minimum vacation each year is five weeks, and most Swedes take all of July off - the "industrial vacation".

In early August, there is the kräftpremiär (crayfish première). It used to follow the crayfish fishing season, but as most crayfish are imported, the exact dates of crayfish parties have become more flexible.

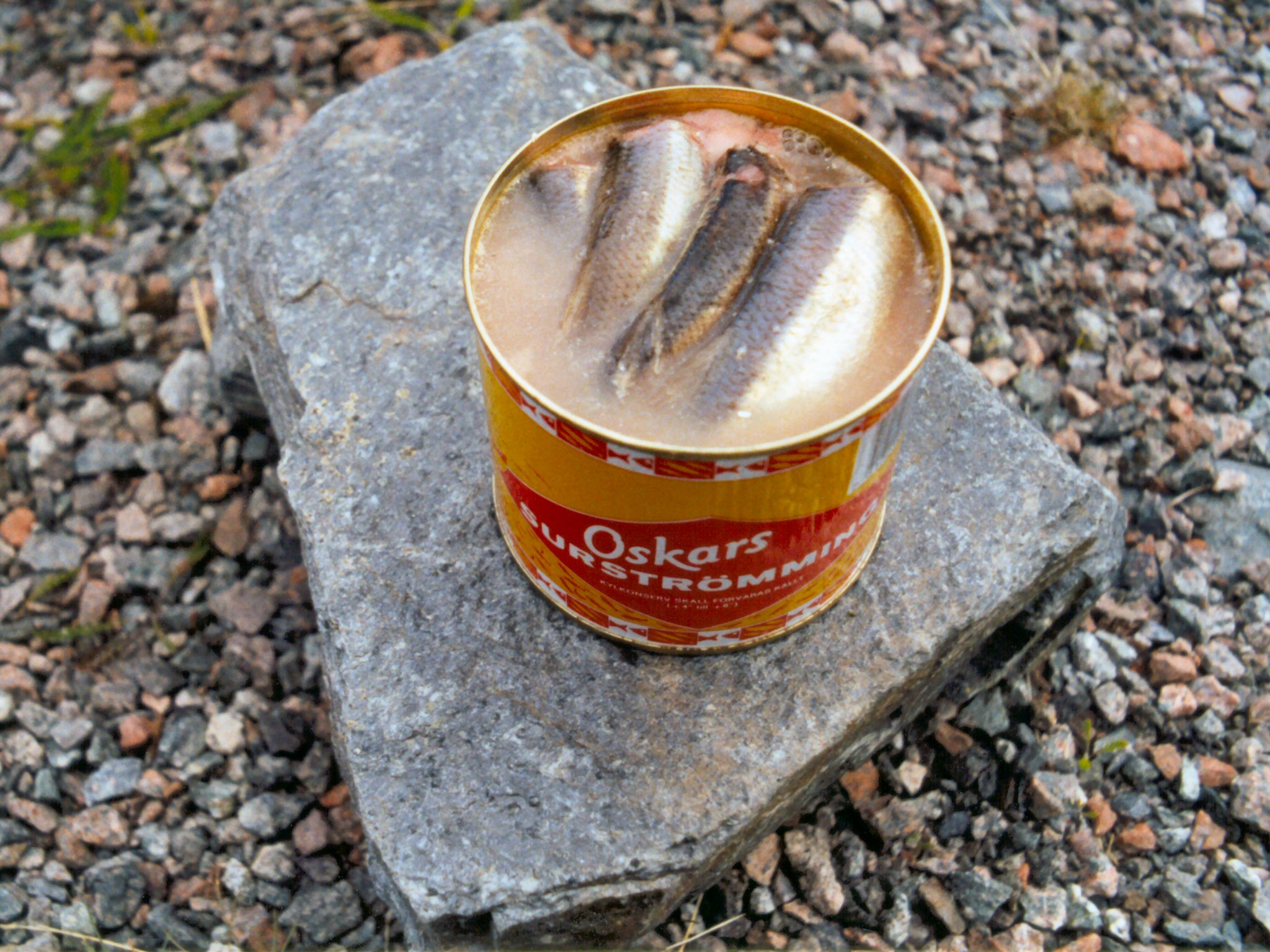
Some Swedes eat surströmming, fermented Baltic herring, in late August. The rest keep distance.

A few weeks later comes the surströmmingspremiär sporting the most exotic food in the Swedish cuisine.

=== Autumn ===
Halloween, the ancient Celtic Irish festival, was imported via the US to Sweden during the 1990s, and is now widely celebrated among children and youth, with another opportunity to collect sweets from neighbours. Halloween is celebrated each year on 31 October. The Church of Sweden celebrates All Saints' Day, alla helgons dag, (defined as the Saturday between October and 6 November, unlike the original Roman Catholic day on 1 November) and is mostly observed by older children in the later teens as an excuse for having drinking parties. The coincident with All Saints has caused some controversy, since the latter is supposed to be a solemn remembrance of the dead. On 11 November, the people of Skåne celebrate Mårtensgås in remembrance of Martin of Tours, by eating goose. This tradition has little recognition in the rest of Sweden.

=== Christmas ===
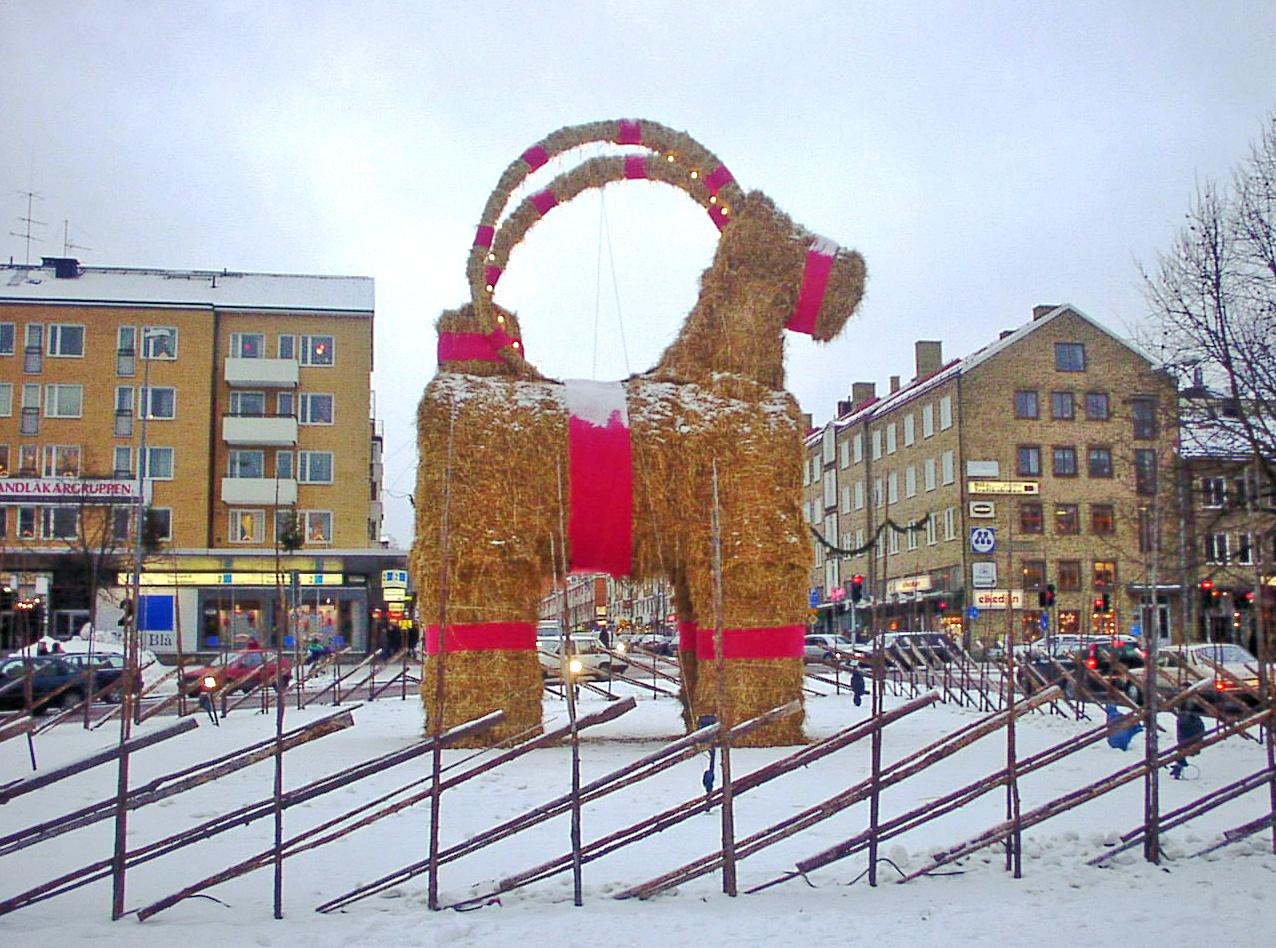
The Gävle goat.

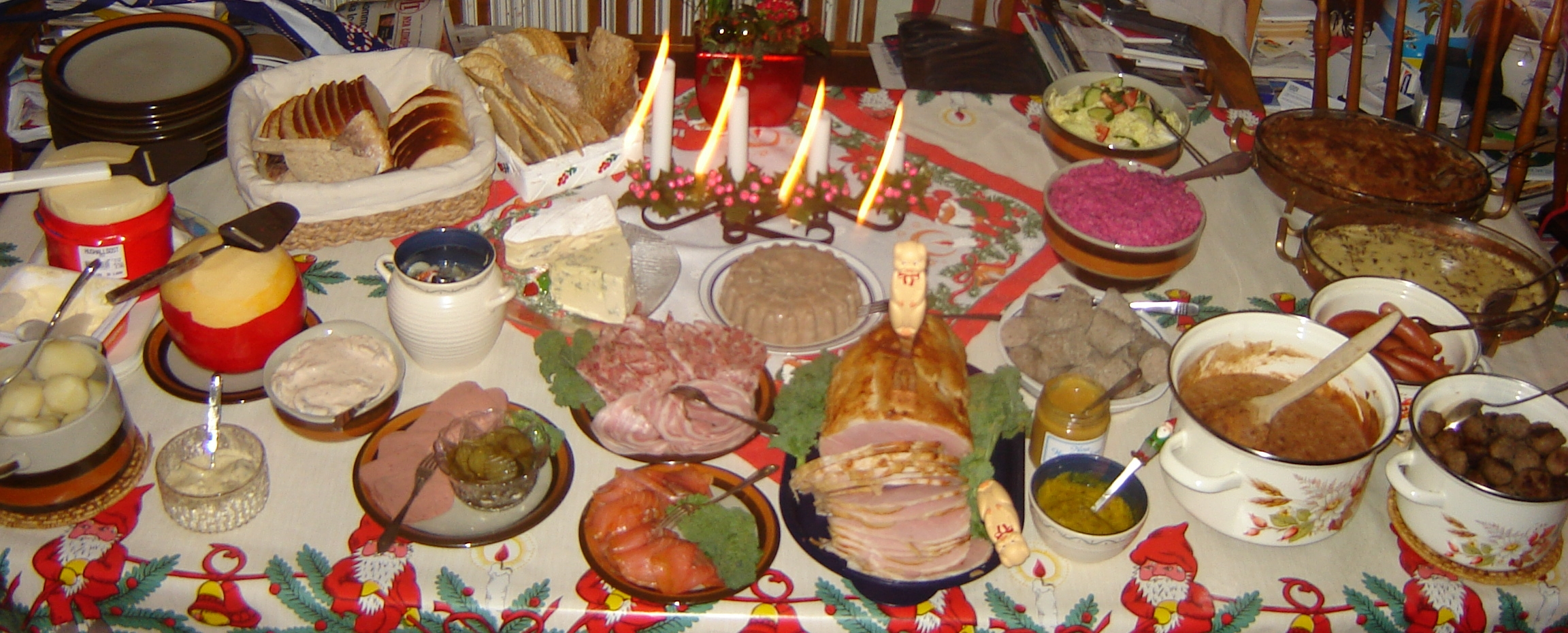
A julbord with Christmas dishes.

Swedes prepare for Christmas, jul, with Advent candles and opening Advent calendars. St. Lucia Day, Luciadagen on 13 December, is a typically Swedish occasion (Imported from Sardinia). During Advent it's also common with Glöggfester mulled wine parties where friends visit each other's homes and drink mulled wine and have gingerbreads.

Traditional Christmas decorations include a Christmas tree, Yule Goats of straw (such as the Gävle goat), tomte and angel figurines and nativity scenes. Decoration has been influenced by Anglo-Saxon traditions, though extensive, blinking Christmas lights as common in the United States are considered to be a bit kitschy.

Many restaurants serve julbord (the Christmas version of smörgåsbord) throughout December. Most Christmas traditions take place as families and relatives gather on Christmas Eve. Jultomten, Santa Claus, visits many homes handing out presents, coincidentally when one family member is absent to buy the newspaper. Also celebrated on 25 December is julotta, a divine service in the morning commemorating the birth of Christ, and it is especially Swedish since it is only celebrated in Sweden and some places in Finland and Norway. Unlike many other Christian countries, cinemas are not closed on Christmas Day. On the contrary, many major films premiere on this day and it has become tradition for many to go to the cinema with the whole family on this night. The second day of Christmas Annandagen is a public holiday and typically the party day. In small and middle sized towns in Sweden, the Christmas Day and second day of Christmas are traditionally the Homecoming days, when people visiting their hometowns get together and party.

==== Christmas television ====
Television (see television of Sweden) has been an important part in Swedish Christmas and New Year celebration, since SVT was started in 1956, which might seem natural with all the stress before the holidays, the darkness and cold outdoors, and the involuntary loneliness of many.

Each Advent, from 1 to 24 December, Sveriges Television features SVT's Christmas calendar ("The Christmas calendar"), a daily drama series for a family audience. The Nobel Prize ceremony on 10 December is also broadcast.

At 15:00 on Christmas Eve, Sveriges Television airs Kalle Anka och hans vänner önskar God Jul (From All of Us to All of You), commonly referred to as Kalle Anka - Donald Duck. (Donald is by far the most popular Disney cartoon in Sweden.) This one-hour show mostly contains clips from classical Disney films, such as Robin Hood and The Jungle Book (with the song The Bare Necessities), as well as promotional clips for recent Disney films, concluded with the song When You Wish Upon A Star. The show is one of the highest-rated Swedish television programs, only rivalled by international sports events and the Eurovision Song Contest, and most Swedish people can recite much of the show.

Another traditional Christmas broadcast is Sagan om Karl-Bertil Jonssons Julafton (Christopher's Christmas Mission).

== See also ==
- Holidays in Sweden
- Flag flying days in Sweden
