= Flavorless candy =

Japanese candy

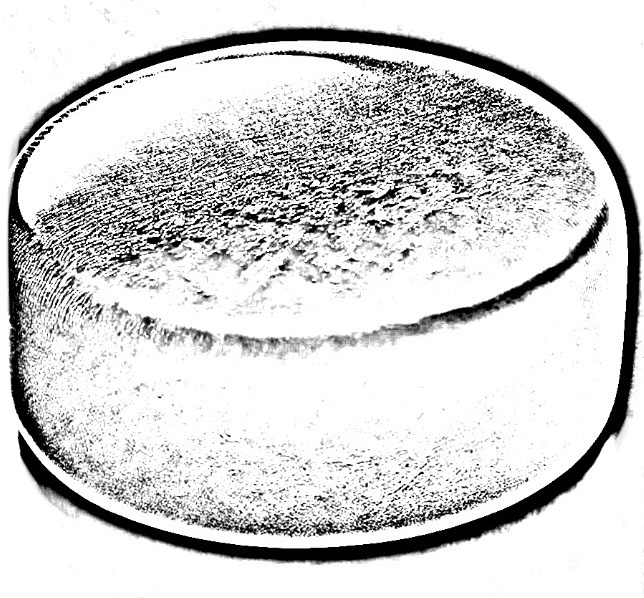
Flavorless candy

Flavorless candy is a Japanese candy designed to have no flavor.

Japan has a long-standing history of creating products with unique flavors. Lawson, a large Japanese convenience store chain, tested several tasteless candies. One product that was developed by candy company Kanro and subsequently launched in 2022 was called Aji no Shinai? Ame (Japanese: 味のしない?飴; translated as "Tasteless? Candy"). When it was released, one bag that contained seven pieces of candy cost 189 yen, the equivalent of about US$1.29 at the time.

Only two ingredients were listed: synthetic sugar substitute polydextrose and organic sugar substitute erythritol.

Although marketed as flavorless, some testers stated there was a very subtle sweetness and aroma of a diluted sports drink.

Due to the COVID-19 pandemic, there was an increased demand for lozenges used for dry mouths while wearing face masks. However, some people did not want the sweetness or flavors that were associated with the existed cough drops. It was designed by Kanro with the purpose to keep the mouth moist without causing a sugary exhalation while wearing a facemask. The flavorless candy went on general sale on July 11, 2022. Subsequently, the concept went viral on social media.

It was initially a temporary product. In October to November 2022, Lawson held a vote of seven trial products, with the top three becoming permanent products. Aji no Shinai? Ame was the top choice, and it subsequently became a permanent product.

According to Lawson's marketing data, the candy was particularly popular with teenagers, women in their 20s, and pregnant women who experienced morning sickness.

Due to the popularity of Aji no Shinai? Ame, an increased demand developed for a chewing gum version. As a result, Lawson approached the company Lotte to develop such a product. After six months of development, Aji no Shinai? Gum (translated as "No Taste? Gum") was released on November 7, 2022. At the time, one bag cost 148 yen or US$0.98.

On March 18, 2024, Morinaga & Company launched a flavorless variety of Hi-Chew called Sono Manma-aji or "Just As It Is Flavor".
