= Lördagsgodis =

Swedish tradition

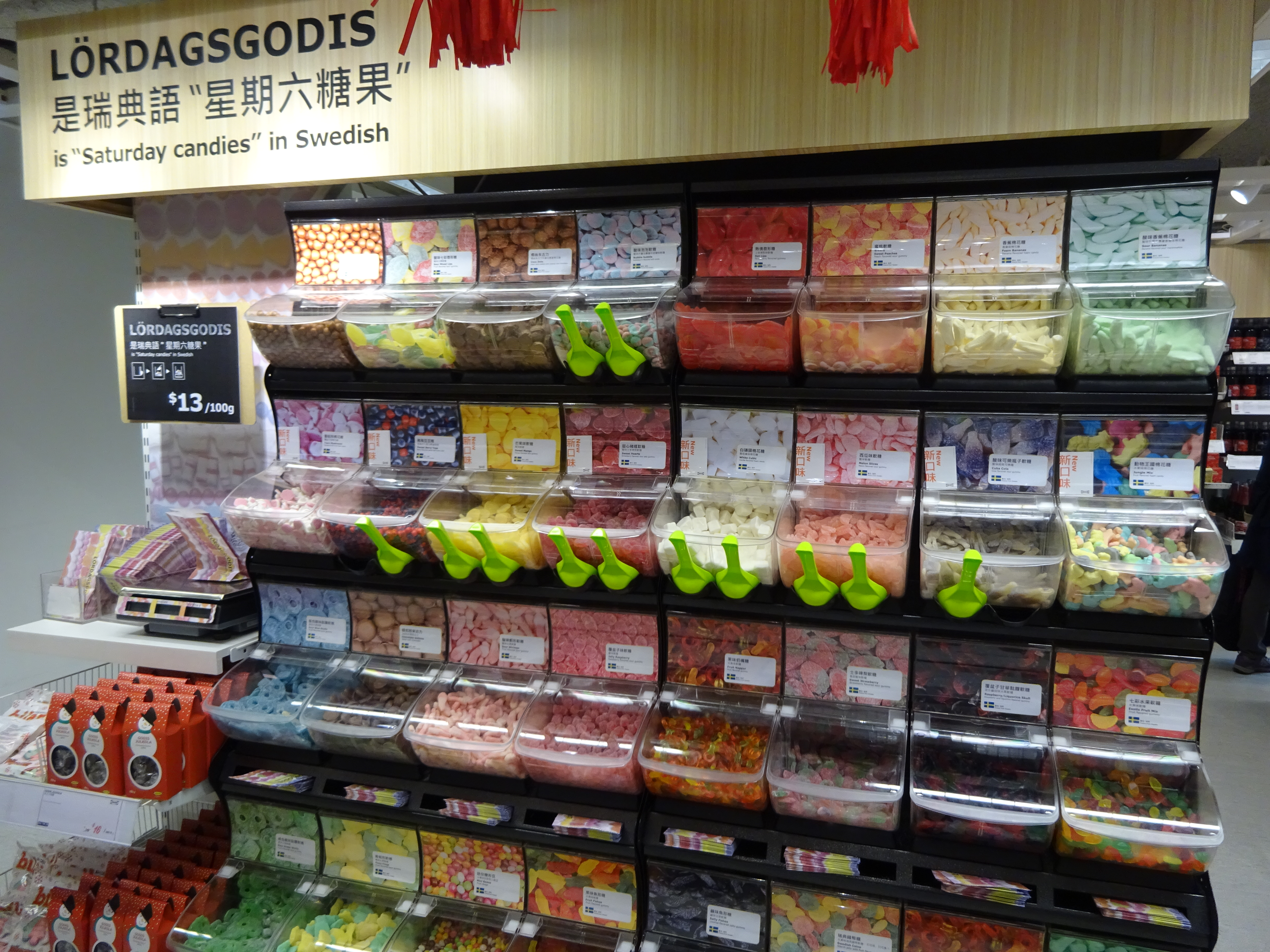
Lördagsgodis at IKEA in Hong Kong.

Lördagsgodis in Swedish, lørdagsgodis or lørdagsgodteri in Norwegian, lit. 'Saturday sweets' or 'Saturday candy', is a Swedish-Norwegian tradition of having children only eating candy or sweets on Saturdays. It works similarly to Santa's naughty list, where children are rewarded with candy on Saturdays for good behaviour during the week, including staying away from sweets.

== History ==
The tradition started as a Swedish health recommendation in 1959 following the government-funded Vipeholm experiments, where patients of Vipeholm Hospital for the intellectually disabled in Lund, Sweden, were unknowingly fed large amounts of sweets to see whether a high-sugar diet would cause tooth decay. Over time, what was once a recommendation has turned into a routine for both children and adults to eat candy on Saturdays, as an event to look forward to during the week.

It is common for Swedes to buy lördagsgodis by weight from candy walls in grocery stores. Candy consumption started increasing in the 1980s and by the 2010s, Sweden had the highest per capita candy consumption in the world. As of 2015, the Swedish government considered enforcing Saturday candy in an effort to improve public health. Such deliberations were met with criticism from groups who instead supported a cap on consumption.
