= Vipeholm experiments =

Unethical human experiments in Sweden, 1945–55

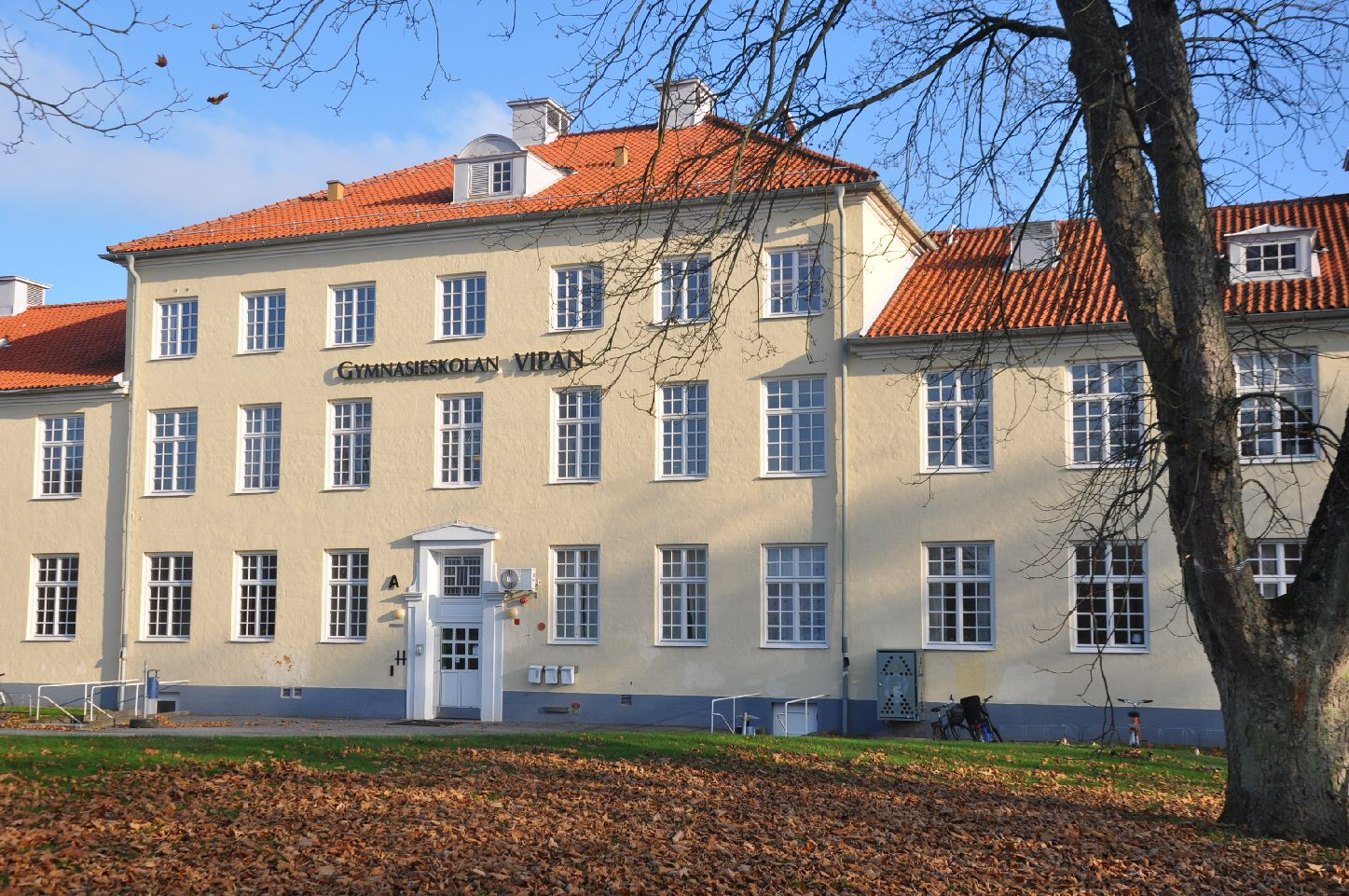
Main building of Vipeholm hospital, now a secondary school

The Vipeholm experiments or Vipeholm Study (Swedish: Vipeholmsexperimenten) were a series of human experiments where patients of Vipeholm Hospital for the intellectually disabled in Lund, Sweden, were given various amounts of sweets to eat, including "extra sticky toffee" (that was specifically manufactured for the study without certain ingredients so that the toffee would stick longer to tooth surfaces) to provoke dental caries. The experiments were sponsored both by the sugar industry and the dentist community, in an effort to determine whether carbohydrates affected the formation of cavities.

The experiments provided extensive knowledge about dental health and resulted in enough empirical data to link the intake of sugar to dental caries. However, today they are considered to have violated multiple principles of medical ethics.

== History ==
The National Dental Service of Sweden was established in 1938. The state of dental health was not well-studied at the time, and cavities were widespread. It was suspected high sugar diets caused tooth decay, but there was no scientific proof. In 1945, the Medical Board commissioned a study on the subject, which would then become the Vipeholm experiments.

Vipeholm was Sweden's largest facility for people with "severe intellectual and developmental disabilities" and was chosen to be the site of the largest experiment ever run on humans in Sweden at the time. Initially, Vipeholm employees were also a part of the experiment.

The experiments began in 1945 as government-sanctioned vitamin trials, but in 1947 sugar was substituted for the vitamins without the knowledge of the government. From 1947 to 1949, a group of patients were used as subjects in a full-scale experiment designed to bring about tooth decay.

At the start of the experiments in 1945, the subjects were first put on a diet with little starch and half the average Swedish consumption of sugar, supplemented by vitamins and fluoride tables. After two years, it was changed for the next two years to a diet including copious amounts of sweets. This was further divided among the subjects in groups consuming:

- Sweet, sticky bread with added sugar.
- Beverages with 1.5 cups of added sugar with each meal.
- Chocolate, caramel and toffees, either 8 or 24 pieces between meals, 'developed specifically to stick better to the teeth'

The sugar experiment lasted until 1949 when the trials were revised again, now to test a more "normal" carbohydrate-rich diet. By then, the teeth of about fifty of the 660 subjects in the experiment had been completely damaged. Only most of the 'highly functioning' intellectually disabled subjects had their teeth treated, others simply had their teeth pulled, as they could not cooperate with dental treatments. Nonetheless, the researchers felt that, scientifically speaking, the experiment was a success.

One of the practical results of the study was the recommendation that it was better for children's teeth to eat sweets once per week, compared to a smaller total amount spread out over most of the week. This practice established itself in Swedish society, and still today many parents only allow their children sweets on Saturdays, known as lördagsgodis (Saturday candy). The researchers also found that the control groups and sweet bread groups had similarly low levels of tooth decay as the subjects during the vitamin trial phase of the experiment. Results from the study kickstarted research into developing artificial sweeteners.

== Delayed results ==
The confectionery industry supported the experiments through donations of money and sweets. Because the experiments had shown a clear link between sugar intake and dental cavities, the industry was not pleased with the results, and researchers delayed publication. When the study was finally made public in 1953, public debate arose over why the results had not been published earlier.

The scientists were accused of having been bought by the industry. However, at the time there was not any public debate about the ethics of the experiments themselves. Modern attitudes in the dental profession are very different: a researcher in the Vipeholm study, Bo Krasse, writes "It is obvious that a research ethics committee would not accept a project like the Vipeholm Study today." He explains "The need for the study was obvious to us as dentists" and states that the Swedish Parliament and then the news media debated the ethics of the study as early as 1953.

== Revelations ==
It was not until the 1990s that studies appeared about the ethical aspects of the Vipeholm experiments. In 2000, the Swedish ombudsman for the disabled reported that the "excesses" of the study were not justified by the results.

Elin Bommenel, a historian and doctoral student at Linköping University, performed a thorough study of the Vipeholm experiments in her dissertation, published in 2006. She was the first researcher to gain access to the original documents from the experimental period at Vipeholm. Her research describes how the scientists found themselves caught between the divergent goals of research and patient care as well as being under immense pressure from both political and economic interests.

== See also ==
- Declaration of Helsinki
