= Octave (liturgy) =

In Christian liturgy, the eighth day after a feast

"Octave" has two senses in Christian liturgical usage. In the first sense, it is the eighth day after a feast, counted inclusively, and so always falls on the same day of the week as the feast itself. The word is derived from Latin octava (eighth), with “dies” (day) implied and understood. In the second sense, the term is applied to the whole eight-day period, during which certain major feasts came to be observed.

Octaves, not being successive, are quite distinct from eight-day weeks and simply refer to the return of the same day of a seven-day week in the inclusive counting system used in Latin (just as the ninth day was a return to the same day of a nundinal cycle, the eight-day week of the pre-Christian Roman calendar).

== Early history ==
The "eighth day" or octava dies was associated with the weekly Christian celebration of the resurrection of Christ every "eighth day", which became a name for Sunday.

As circumcision is performed in Judaism on the “eighth day” after birth, the number 8 became associated in Christianity with Baptism, and baptismal fonts have from an early date often been octagonal.

The practice of octaves was first introduced under Constantine I, when the dedication festivities of the basilicas at Jerusalem and Tyre, Lebanon were observed for eight days. After these one-off occasions, annual liturgical feasts began to be dignified with an octave. The first such feasts accorded such were Easter, Pentecost, and in the East, Epiphany. This occurred in the 4th century and served as a time for the newly converted to take a joyful retreat.

The development of octaves occurred slowly. From the 4th century to the 7th century, Christians observed octaves with a celebration on the eighth day, with little development of the liturgies within the intervening days. Christmas was the next feast to receive an octave, and by the 8th century, Rome had developed liturgical octaves not only for Easter, Pentecost, and Christmas, but also for the Epiphany as in the East, and the feast of the dedication of a church.

From the 7th century, saints’ feasts also began to have octaves (as an eighth-day feast, not eight days of feasting), among the oldest being those of Saints Peter and Paul, Saint Lawrence and Saint Agnes. From the 12th century, the custom arose of liturgical observance of the days between the first and the eighth day, as well as the eighth day. During the Middle Ages, octaves for various other feasts and saints were celebrated, depending upon the diocese or religious order.

== Western Christianity ==
=== Catholic Church ===
==== From Pius V to Pius XII ====
While Pope Pius V reduced the amount of octaves in 1568, these were still numerous. Not only on the eighth day from the feast but, with the exception of the octaves of Easter, Pentecost, and, to a lesser extent, Christmas, on all the intervening days the liturgy was the same as on the feast day itself, with the exact same prayers and Scripture readings.

Octaves were classified into several types. Easter and Pentecost had “specially privileged” octaves, during which no other feast whatsoever could be celebrated. Christmas, Epiphany, and Corpus Christi had “privileged” octaves, during which certain highly ranked feasts might be celebrated. The octaves of other feasts allowed even more feasts to be celebrated therein.

To reduce the repetition of the same liturgy for several days, Pope Leo XIII and Pope Pius X made further distinctions, classifying octaves into three primary types: privileged, common, and simple. Privileged octaves were further arranged in a hierarchy of first, second, and third orders. For the first half of the 20th century, octaves were ranked in the following manner, which affected holding other celebrations within them:

- Privileged Octaves
  - Privileged Octaves of the First Order
    - Octave of Easter
    - Octave of Pentecost
  - Privileged Octaves of the Second Order
    - Octave of Epiphany
    - Octave of Corpus Christi
  - Privileged Octaves of the Third Order
    - Octave of Christmas
    - Octave of the Ascension
    - Octave of the Sacred Heart
- Common Octaves
  - Octave of the Immaculate Conception BVM
  - Octave of the Solemnity of St. Joseph
  - Octave of the Nativity of St. John the Baptist
  - Octave of Ss. Peter and Paul
  - Octave of the Assumption BVM
  - Octave of All Saints
- Simple Octaves
  - Octave of St. Stephen
  - Octave of St. John the Apostle
  - Octave of the Holy Innocents
  - Octave of St. Lawrence
  - Octave of the Nativity BVM

In addition to these, the patron saint of a particular nation, diocese, or church was celebrated therein with an octave, on each day of which the Mass and Office of the feast was repeated, unless impeded by a higher-ranked celebration.

Although the feasts of St. Lawrence and the Nativity of the Blessed Virgin Mary officially still had simple octaves, by the 20th century they had all but vanished as higher-ranking feasts were added to the calendar. The octave day alone of St. Lawrence was still commemorated during the Mass of St. Hyacinth. The entire octave of the Nativity of the Blessed Virgin Mary was impeded, but The Most Holy Name of Mary was celebrated during the octave, and The Seven Sorrows of the Blessed Virgin Mary was celebrated on the former octave day.

==== Reductions by Pius XII and Paul VI ====
Pope Pius XII further simplified the Calendar with a decree dated 23 March 1955: only the octaves of Christmas, Easter and Pentecost were kept, as these did not repeat the same liturgy daily. All other octaves in the Roman Rite were suppressed, including those of local calendars (see General Roman Calendar of Pope Pius XII#Octaves). In 1969, the Church further revised the Calendar by deleting the Octave of Pentecost.

The first eight days of the Easter Season were made the Octave of Easter and celebrated as Solemnities of the Lord, with proper readings and prayers. The Second Sunday of Easter, which ends the Easter Octave, has also been called “White Sunday” (Dominica in albis), among other traditional names.

The Christmas Octave is presently arranged as follows:

- Sunday within the octave: Feast of the Holy Family; celebrated on Friday, December 30 when Christmas falls on a Sunday
- 26 December: Feast of Saint Stephen
- 27 December: Feast of John the Apostle
- 28 December: Feast of the Holy Innocents
- 29-31 December: days within the octave, with assigned readings and prayers, on which the celebration of optional memorials is permitted according to special rubrics (but as noted above, when Christmas is a Sunday, the Feast of the Holy Family is celebrated on December 30)
- 1 January, octave day of the Nativity; Solemnity of Mary, Mother of God

=== Lutheran Church ===
The liturgical calendar of the Lutheran churches may have octaves for the following feasts: "The Nativity of Our Lord, The Epiphany of Our Lord, The Resurrection of Our Lord, All Saints, Ascension Day, Pentecost and Trinity Sunday."

=== Anglican Communion ===
Churches within the Anglican Communion traditionally observed octaves associated with the feasts of Christmas, Corpus Christi, Epiphany, Michaelmas, Easter, and All Saints' Day. Many provinces have followed the Catholic Church and altered the practice of observing octaves. In the Church of England, the only octave that remains in some form is that of Easter: no other feasts may be celebrated in the six days following Easter Sunday, and only a Dedication Festival or Patronal Festival may be celebrated on the Second Sunday of Easter.

== Eastern Christianity ==
Among the Eastern Orthodox and Byzantine Rite Eastern Catholic Churches, what in the West would be called an Octave is referred to as an Afterfeast. The celebration of the Great Feasts of the church year are extended for a number days, depending upon the particular Feast. Each day of an Afterfeast will have particular hymns assigned to it, continuing the theme of the Feast being celebrated.

Most of these Great Feasts (except Feasts within the moveable Paschal Cycle) also have a day or more of preparation called a Forefeast. Forefeasts and Afterfeasts will affect the structure of the services during the Canonical Hours.

The last day of an Afterfeast is called the Apodosis (lit. "giving-back") of the Feast. On the Apodosis, most of the hymns that were chanted on the first day of the Feast are repeated. On the Apodoses of Feasts of the Theotokos, the Epistle and Gospel of the Feast are repeated again at the Divine Liturgy.

== Non-liturgical usage ==
The term "octave" is applied to some church observances that are not strictly liturgical. For example, many churches observe an annual "Octave of Prayer for Christian Unity", which runs from 18 January to 25 January. The octave was established in 1895 by Pope Leo XIII for the period between Ascension and Pentecost. In 1909, Pope Pius X approved the transfer of this octave to the period between the former feast of the Chair of St. Peter (then on January 18) and the feast of the Conversion of St. Paul (January 25).

In 1968, the World Council of Churches and the Vatican's Pontifical Council for Promoting Christian Unity agreed to jointly publish prayer materials for the occasion under the title "Week of Prayer for Christian Unity", but it is still often referred to as an octave, especially within the Roman Catholic, Lutheran and Anglo-Catholic traditions. The Week of Prayer is observed at various times around the world, especially in the Southern Hemisphere where it is commonly observed from Ascension to Pentecost.

Each year, Luxembourg celebrates the Oktav in honour of Our Lady of Luxembourg, patroness of the city. Despite its name, the occasion is held from the 3rd to the 5th Sunday after Easter, making it 15 instead of 8 days.

== See also ==
- Isru chag
