= Momentum (disambiguation) =

Momentum, or linear momentum, is a vector quantity in physics.

Momentum may also refer to:

== Economics ==
- Momentum (finance), an empirical tendency for rising asset prices to continue to rise
- Momentum (technical analysis), an indicator used in technical analysis of asset prices
- Momentum investing, a system of buying stocks or other securities

== Mathematics, science, and technology ==
- Angular momentum, in physics, the rotational equivalent of linear momentum
- Momentum or moment, a medieval unit of time
- Behavioral momentum, a theory and metaphor used in the quantitative analysis of behavior
- Momentum (electromagnetic simulator), a software package from EEsof
- Momentum theory, a theory in fluid mechanics
- Momentum, in mathematics, a correction term in gradient descent and stochastic gradient descent
- Momentum, a solar car built in 2005 by the University of Michigan Solar Car Team

== Arts and entertainment ==
=== Film ===
- Momentum (1992 film), a documentary short, the first film shot and released in the IMAX HD format
- Momentum (2001 film), a surfing documentary
- Momentum (2003 film), an American-German science fiction television film
- Momentum (2015 film), a South African action-thriller film
- Momentum Pictures, UK motion picture distributor

=== Television ===
- "Momentum" (The Lincoln Lawyer), a 2022 television episode

=== Music ===
==== Albums ====
- Momentum (Bill Evans album), 2012
- Momentum (Dave Burrell album) or the title song, 2006
- Momentum (DGM album), 2013
- Momentum (Jamie Cullum album), 2013
- Momentum (Joshua Redman album), 2005
- Momentum (Neal Morse album) or the title song, 2012
- Momentum (Steve Hackett album) or the title song, 1988
- Momentum (Steve Lacy album) or the title song, 1987
- Momentum (TobyMac album) or the title song, 2001
- Momentum, Willisau 1988, by Jimmy Giuffre and André Jaume, or the title song, 1997
- Momentum, by Close to Home, 2012
- Momentum, by GBH, 2017

==== EPs ====
- Momentum (Battery EP), 1998
- Momentum (Stevie Stone EP) or the title song, 2012
- Momentum (Live in Manila), by Planetshakers, or the title song, 2016

==== Songs ====
- "Momentum", by Aimee Mann from the Magnolia film soundtrack, 1999
- "Momentum", by Amaranthe from Helix, 2018
- "Momentum", by Ayumi Hamasaki from Secret, 2006
- "Momentum", by Burst from Lazarus Bird, 2008
- "Momentum", by Nuno Lupi from Intermezzo
- "Momentum", by Zumpano from Goin' Through Changes, 1996

== Other uses ==
- Momentum Group Limited, a South African financial services company
- Momentum (organisation), a British political organisation
- Momentum (pickleball), motion that unintentionally causes a player to step into the non-volley zone
- Momentum Movement, a Hungarian political party
- Momentum Party, a New Zealand political party
- Momentum, a Maltese political party
- Operation Momentum, a guerrilla training program of the Laotian Civil War
- Momentum, a magazine published by the National Catholic Educational Association
- Momentum, a Christian festival run by the UK charity Soul Survivor
- Momentum, a website on civil rights published by Medium
- Momentum, a slang term for Dynamic Difficulty Adjustment in video games, especially in sports simulations

== See also ==
- Moment (disambiguation)
- Omentum (disambiguation)
