= Five-day week =

Five-day week may refer to:

- Five-day workweek
- Week#"Weeks" in other calendars, five-day grouping or division of a month or year
