= Momentos =

Momentos means moments in Spanish and Portuguese.

Momentos may also refer to:

- Momentos (Al Bano and Romina Power album), a 1979 album by Al Bano & Romina Power
- Momentos (Julio Iglesias album)
- Momentos (La Mafia album)
- Momentos (Luiza Possi album), a 2015 compilation album by Luiza Possi
- Momentos (film), a 1981 Argentinian film

== See also ==
- Los Momentos, a 2013 album by Julieta Venegas
- Moment (disambiguation)
