= The Moment =

The Moment(s) may refer to:

== Film and television ==
- The Moment (1979 film), a Romanian film
- The Moment (2013 film), an American film
- The Moment (2026 film), an American film
- The Moment (American TV series), a 2013 reality series
- The Moment (New Zealand TV series), a 2018 comedy series

== Literature ==
- "The Moment" (story), a 2009 science fiction short story by Lawrence M. Schoen
- The Moment, a 2011 novel by Douglas Kennedy

== Music ==
=== Performers ===
- The Moment (band), a 1980s UK mod revival band
- The Moments (American group), later Ray, Goodman & Brown, an R&B vocal group
- The Moments (English band), a 1960s rhythm and blues band

=== Albums ===
- The Moment (Aaron Yan album) or the title song, 2012
- The Moment (Jimmy MacCarthy album) or the title song, 2002
- The Moment (Kenny Barron album) or the title instrumental, 1994
- The Moment (Kenny G album) or the title instrumental (see below), 1996
- The Moment (Lisa Stansfield album) or the title song, 2004
- The Moment (Manafest album) or the title song, 2014
- The Moment (Stefanie Sun album), 2003
- The Moment, by Atomic Tom, 2010
- The Moment, by Framing Hanley, 2007

=== Songs ===
- "The Moment" (Ai song), 2021
- "The Moment" (Kenny G composition), 1996
- "The Moment", by SafetySuit from Life Left to Go, 2008
- "The Moment", by Tame Impala from Currents, 2015

== See also ==
- "The One Moment", a 2014 song by OK Go
- Moment (disambiguation)
