= Prey on Life =

Studio album by Burst
- Released: 23 September 2003
- Recorded: Studio Phlat Planet/Fredman Gothenburg, Sweden
- Genre: Post-hardcore, progressive metal
- Length: 40:45
- Label: Relapse Records; Ritual Records
- Producer: Fredrik Reinedahl and Burst

Burst chronology
Conquest: Writhe (2000)	Prey on Life (2003)	Origo (2005)

Prey on Life is the third full-length album from Swedish progressive metal band Burst.

== Track listing ==
No.	Title	Length
1.	"Undoing (Prey on Life)"	2:40
2.	"Iris"	3:05
3.	"Sculpt the Lives"	3:16
4.	"Rain"	5:10
5.	"The Foe Sublime"	4:28
6.	"Fourth Sun"	3:01
7.	"Crystal Asunder"	3:29
8.	"Vortex"	3:30
9.	"Monument"	4:03
10.	"Visionary"	5:23
11.	"Epidemic"	2:40
