= Two Faced (album) =

Studio album by Burst
- Released: 1998
- Length: 40:24
- Label: Birdnest Records; Melon Records (Melon 971003)

Burst chronology
| Forsaken, Not Forgotten (1998) | Two Faced (1998) | Conquest: Writhe (2000) |

Two Faced is the first full-length studio album by Swedish band Burst.

== Track listing ==
| No. | Title | Length |
|---|---|---|
| 1. | "Virgin Rebirth" | 3:30 |
| 2. | "Two-Faced" | 3:03 |
| 3. | ".... Is Isolation" | 2:21 |
| 4. | "Callous" | 3:34 |
| 5. | "The Curtain Falls" | 2:39 |
| 6. | "Crossbreed" | 2:52 |
| 7. | "Lifeline" | 2:51 |
| 8. | "Opened Wide" | 2:25 |
| 9. | "Repentance" | 2:02 |
| 10. | "The Vanguard" | 2:13 |
| 11. | "Cadence of the Faithless" | 12:54 |
