= Planetary hours =

Hours planets rule in a day

The planetary hours are an ancient system in which one of the seven classical planets is given rulership over each day and various parts of the day. Developed in Hellenistic astrology, it has possible roots in older Babylonian astrology, and it is the origin of the names of the days of the week as used in English and numerous other languages.

The classical planets are Saturn, Jupiter, Mars, the Sun, Venus, Mercury and the Moon, and they take rulership over the hours in this sequence.

The sequence is from slowest- to fastest-moving as the planets appear in the night sky, and so is from furthest to nearest in the planetary spheres model. This order has come to be known as the "Chaldean order".

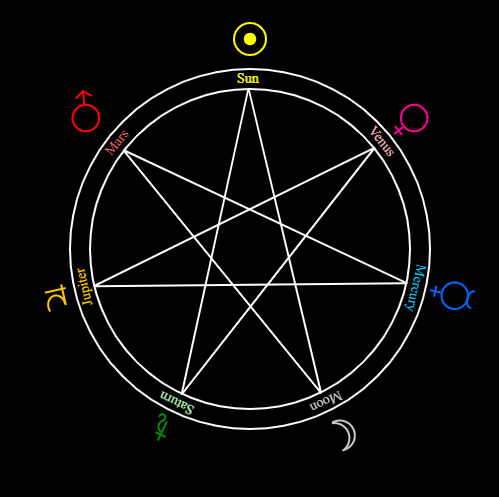
Diagram showing the relationship between the Chaldean order of the classical planets (outer circle) and the order of the days of the week (heptagram)

As each day is divided into 24 hours and 24 ÷ 7 has a remainder of 3, the first hour of a day is ruled by the planet three places down in the Chaldean order from the planet ruling the first hour of the preceding day; i.e. a day with its first hour ruled by the Sun ("Sunday") is followed by a day with its first hour ruled by the Moon ("Monday"), followed by Mars ("Tuesday"), Mercury ("Wednesday"), Jupiter ("Thursday"), Venus ("Friday") and Saturn ("Saturday"), again followed by Sunday, yielding the familiar naming of the days of the week.

== History ==
The astrological order of the days was explained by Vettius Valens and Dio Cassius (and Chaucer gave the same explanation in his Treatise on the Astrolabe). According to these authors, it was a principle of astrology that the heavenly bodies presided, in succession, over the hours of the day. The Ptolemaic system of planetary spheres asserts that the order of the heavenly bodies, from the farthest to the closest to the Earth is: Saturn, Jupiter, Mars, Sun, Venus, Mercury, Moon (or, objectively, the planets are ordered from slowest to fastest moving as they appear in the night sky – note however that the sun, Venus, and Mercury all advance by 360° per year, on average).

In astrological theory, not only the days of the week, but the hours of the day are dominated by the seven luminaries. If the first hour of a day is dominated by Saturn, then the second hour is dominated by Jupiter, the third by Mars, and so on with the Sun, Venus, Mercury, and the moon, so that the sequence of planets repeats every seven hours. Therefore, the twenty-fifth hour, which is the first hour of the following day, is dominated by the Sun; the forty-ninth hour, which is the first hour of the next day, by the Moon. Thus, if a day is labelled by the planet which dominates its first hour, then Saturn's day is followed by the Sun's day, which is followed by the Moon's day, and so forth, as shown below.

According to Vettius Valens, the first hour of the day began at sunset, which follows Greek and Babylonian convention. He also states that the light and dark halves of the day were presided over by the heavenly bodies of the first hour of each half. This is confirmed by a Pompeian graffito which calls 6 February 60 a "Sunday", even though by modern reckoning it would have been a Wednesday. Assuming that this graffito used the sunset naming convention of Valens, it would follow that 6 February 60 was a Wednesday according to the sunrise naming convention used in modern astrology, suggesting that there may be an unbroken continuity of weekdays connecting the modern period to the 1st century AD at least.

These two overlapping naming systems continued to be used by Alexandrian Christians during the 4th century, but the days in both were simply numbered 1 to 7. Although names of planets (or the gods eponymous of the planets) were not used, the week beginning on Wednesday was named in Greek τῶν θεῶν tṓn theṓn ([day] of the [planetary] gods), as used by the late 4th century editor of the 328–373 Easter letters of Bishop Athanasius, and was named tentyon (a Ge'ez transcription of the Greek words) in a table of Easter dates for 311–369 that survives in an Ethiopian copy. The day of the week of Thoth 1 of the Alexandrian calendar and of Maskaram 1 of the Ethiopian calendar, the first day of their respective years, is given using the ton theon and tentyon respectively, both weeks beginning Wednesday = 1 in a column of 532-year Paschal tables. In a neighboring column of those same tables, both first days are also given a day of the week called the Day of John with a week beginning Sunday = 1. Both the ton theon and tentyon of these first days of the Alexandrian and Ethiopian years are numerically identical to the day of the week of the next March 24 in the Julian calendar using a Sunday = 1 week, which medieval computists called the concurrent. These overlapping weeks are still used in the Ethiopian computus.

== Table of hours ==
A table of hours is shown for a sequence of seven days, with the day of the week indicated both for the sunrise (hour 1) and the sunset (hour 13) naming conventions. Day hours are calculated by adding up the amount of minutes from sunrise and sunset, then dividing by 12. Night hours are calculated by adding up the minutes from sunset to sunrise the next day, then dividing by 12.

1 (sunrise)	2	3	4	5	6	7	8	9	10	11	12	13 (sunset)	14	15	16	17	18	19	20	21	22	23	24
Saturday	Jupiter	Mars	Sun	Venus	Mercury	Moon	Saturn	Jupiter	Mars	Sun	Venus	(Wednesday)	Moon	Saturn	Jupiter	Mars	Sun	Venus	Mercury	Moon	Saturn	Jupiter	Mars
Sunday	Venus	Mercury	Moon	Saturn	Jupiter	Mars	Sun	Venus	Mercury	Moon	Saturn	(Thursday)	Mars	Sun	Venus	Mercury	Moon	Saturn	Jupiter	Mars	Sun	Venus	Mercury
Monday	Saturn	Jupiter	Mars	Sun	Venus	Mercury	Moon	Saturn	Jupiter	Mars	Sun	(Friday)	Mercury	Moon	Saturn	Jupiter	Mars	Sun	Venus	Mercury	Moon	Saturn	Jupiter
Tuesday	Sun	Venus	Mercury	Moon	Saturn	Jupiter	Mars	Sun	Venus	Mercury	Moon	(Saturday)	Jupiter	Mars	Sun	Venus	Mercury	Moon	Saturn	Jupiter	Mars	Sun	Venus
Wednesday	Moon	Saturn	Jupiter	Mars	Sun	Venus	Mercury	Moon	Saturn	Jupiter	Mars	(Sunday)	Venus	Mercury	Moon	Saturn	Jupiter	Mars	Sun	Venus	Mercury	Moon	Saturn
Thursday	Mars	Sun	Venus	Mercury	Moon	Saturn	Jupiter	Mars	Sun	Venus	Mercury	(Monday)	Saturn	Jupiter	Mars	Sun	Venus	Mercury	Moon	Saturn	Jupiter	Mars	Sun
Friday	Mercury	Moon	Saturn	Jupiter	Mars	Sun	Venus	Mercury	Moon	Saturn	Jupiter	(Tuesday)	Sun	Venus	Mercury	Moon	Saturn	Jupiter	Mars	Sun	Venus	Mercury	Moon

== Astrological significance ==
Calculation of the planetary hours played a certain role in Renaissance astrology and magic. Astronomical tables published in the late 15th or during the 16th century often included a table of planetary hours with their significations, but their application was of limited importance to astrology as practiced, with Cornelius Gemma explicitly stating that he accorded them little weight.

The 16th-century Key of Solomon has a chapter on the topic, giving examples for the types of magic considered appropriate for the days or hours associated with each planet, for example:

- In the Days and Hours of Saturn: the summoning of Souls from Hades, but only of those who have died a natural death
- In the Days and Hours of Jupiter: obtaining honours, acquiring riches, contracting friendships, preserving health
- In the Days and Hours of Mars: experiments regarding War, to arrive at military honour, acquire courage, overthrow enemies, etc.; in the hours of Mars: summoning Souls from Hades, especially of those slain in battle.
- In the Days and Hours of the Sun: experiments regarding temporal wealth, hope, gain, fortune, divination, the favour of princes, to dissolve hostile feeling, and to make friends.
- In the Days and Hours of Venus: forming friendships, for kindness and love, joyous and pleasant undertakings, travelling; in the hours of Venus: lots, poisons, preparing powders provocative of madness, etc.
- In the Days and Hours of Mercury: eloquence and intelligence, promptitude in business, science and divination, etc.; in the Hours of Mercury: undertaking experiments relating to games, raillery jests, sports, etc.
- In the Days and Hours of the Moon: embassies, voyages, envoys, messages, navigation; reconciliation, love, and the acquisition of merchandise by water; in the hours of the Moon: making trial of experiments relating to recovery of stolen property, for obtaining nocturnal visions, for summoning Spirits in sleep, and for preparing anything relating to Water.

== See also ==
- Hellenistic astrology
- Planets in astrology
- Thaumaturgy
- Vāra (astronomy)
