= Atom (time) =

Smallest possible unit of time in medieval philosophy

An atom of time is the smallest possible unit of time.

== History ==
One of the earliest occurrences of the word "atom" to mean the smallest possible unit of measuring time is found in the Greek text of the New Testament in Paul's 1 Corinthians 15:52. The text compares the length of time of the "atom" to the time needed for "the twinkling of an eye." The text reads: "ἐν ἀτόμῳ, ἐν ῥιπῇ ὀφθαλμοῦ" – "en atomo, en ripe ophthamou" – the word "atom" is usually translated "a moment" – "In a moment, in the twinkling of an eye".

It was later referred to in medieval philosophical writings in this sense as the smallest possible division of time. The earliest known occurrence in English is in Byrhtferth's Enchiridion of 1010–1012, where it was defined as 1/564 of a momentum (1½ minutes), and thus equal to almost 160 milliseconds. It was used in the computus, the calculation used to determine the calendar date of Easter.

== See also ==
- Planck time
