= Week =

Time unit equal to seven days

A week (in the Western and international context) is a unit of time equal to seven days. It is the standard calendrical period between a day and a month in most parts of the world. There are just over 52 weeks in a year, or on average 4 1/3 weeks in a month. The days of the week are often used to set work days, rest days, and holy days. The term "week" is also used to refer to a sub-section of the week, such as the workweek and weekend. Certain weeks within a year may be designated for a particular purpose, such as Golden Week in China and Japan. More informally, certain groups may advocate awareness weeks, such as National Family Week in Canada, which are designed to draw attention to a certain subject or cause.

Some ancient and traditional cultures have or had different week lengths, including ten days in Egypt, an eight-day week for Etruscans and ancient Romans, and four- or five-day weeks between market days in modern West Africa. (See also the Japanese ten-day jun, used alongside the 7-day week.) The Romans later switched to a seven-day week. This was originally a so-called planetary or astrological week, a cycle of disputed origins that named each day after a classical planet and the god identified with that planet. Due to the spread of Christianity, the Romans' astrological week was identified and merged with the Christian seven-day week centred on Sunday (the day of the Resurrection of Christ), which had originated with the Jewish seven-day week centred on Saturday. Both the astrological week and the Jewish week may have been inspired by seven-day cycles in the Babylonian calendar, although the evidence for that is weak. In AD 321, Emperor Constantine the Great decreed a seven-day week in the Roman Empire, including making Sunday a public holiday. This spread across Europe, then the rest of the world.

World map showing the first day of the week used in different countries according to the Common Locale Data Repository Monday Friday (Maldives only) Saturday Sunday

In English, the days use Germanic equivalents of the Roman names, apart from Saturday, which had no equivalent: Sunday (Sol/sun day), Monday (Luna/moon day), Tuesday (Mars/Tiw's day), Wednesday (Mercury/Woden's day), Thursday (Jupiter/Thor's day), Friday (Venus/Friga's day), and Saturday (Saturn day).

Which days of the week are designated the first and the last varies by culture, though virtually all have Saturday, Sunday, or Monday as the first day.

The three Abrahamic religions observe different days of the week as their holy day. Christians observe the Sabbath on Sunday (see Sabbath in Christianity), traditionally the first day of the week, in honor of the resurrection of Jesus. Muslims observe the Sabbath on Friday (see Friday prayer), because it was described as a sacred day of congregational worship in the Quran. Jews observe the Sabbath on Saturday (Shabbat), the seventh day, in honor of God's creation of the world in six days and resting on the seventh.

== Name ==
The English word week comes from the Old English wice, ultimately from a Common Germanic *wikōn-, from a root *wik- "turn, move, change". The Germanic word probably had a wider meaning before the Roman calendar was adopted, perhaps "succession series", as suggested by Gothic wikō translating taxis "order" in Luke 1:8.

The seven-day week is named in many languages by a word derived from "seven". The archaism sennight ("seven-night") preserves the old Germanic practice of reckoning time by nights, as in the more common fortnight ("fourteen-night"). Hebdomad and hebdomadal week both derive from the Greek hebdomás (ἑβδομάς, "a seven"). Septimana is cognate with the Romance terms derived from Latin septimana ("seven mornings").

== Definition and duration ==
A week is defined as an interval of exactly seven days, (Note: In pre-modern times, days were measured either from sunset to sunset, or from sunrise to sunrise so that the length of the week (and the day) would be subject to slight variations depending upon the time of year and the observer's geographical latitude.) so that, except when passing through daylight saving time transitions or leap seconds,

1 week = 7 days = 168 hours = 10,080 minutes = 604,800 seconds.

With respect to the Gregorian calendar:

- 1 Gregorian calendar year = 52 weeks + 1 day (2 days in a leap year)
- 1 week = 1600/6957 ≈ 22.9984% of an average Gregorian month

In a Gregorian mean year, there are 365.2425 days, and thus exactly 52 71/400 or 52.1775 weeks (unlike the Julian year of 365.25 days or 52 5/28 ≈ 52.1786 weeks). There are exactly 20,871 weeks in 400 Gregorian years, so 22 November 1626 was a Sunday, just as was 22 November 2026.

Relative to the path of the Moon, a week is 23.659% of an average lunation or 94.637% of an average quarter lunation.

Historically, the system of dominical letters (letters A to G identifying the weekday of the first day of a given year) has been used to facilitate calculation of the day of week. The day of the week can be easily calculated given a date's Julian day number (JD, i.e. the integer value at noon UT): Adding one to the remainder after dividing the Julian day number by seven (JD modulo 7 + 1) yields that date's ISO 8601 day of the week. For example, the Julian day number of 22 November 2026 is 2461367. Calculating 2461367 mod 7 + 1 yields 7, corresponding to Sunday. In 1973, John Conway devised the Doomsday rule for mental calculation of the weekday of any date in any year.

=== Start and end ===
Cultures vary as to which days of the week are designated the first and the last on their calendars, though virtually all have Saturday, Sunday, or Monday as the first day. (Note: The first day of the work week is not always the "first day of the week" on calendars, see Workweek and weekend for more information.) The International Organization for Standardization uses Monday as the first day of the week in its ISO week date system through the international ISO 8601 standard. (Note: "ISO 8601 Data elements and interchange formats – Information interchange – Representation of dates and times" is an international standard covering the exchange of date- and time-related data.) Most of Europe, China, West and Central Africa, and Oceania count Monday as the first day of the week, while much of America, South and Southeast Asia, and southern Africa count Sunday as the first. Most Arabic- and Persian-speaking countries use Saturday as the first day of the week, though some use Monday (Lebanon, Morocco, Tunisia and Tajikistan) or Sunday (Saudi Arabia and Yemen). Other regions are mixed, but nearly all observe either Sunday or Monday as the first day. The first day used in calendars may differ from the numbered "name" of the day in a particular place.

== Days of the week ==
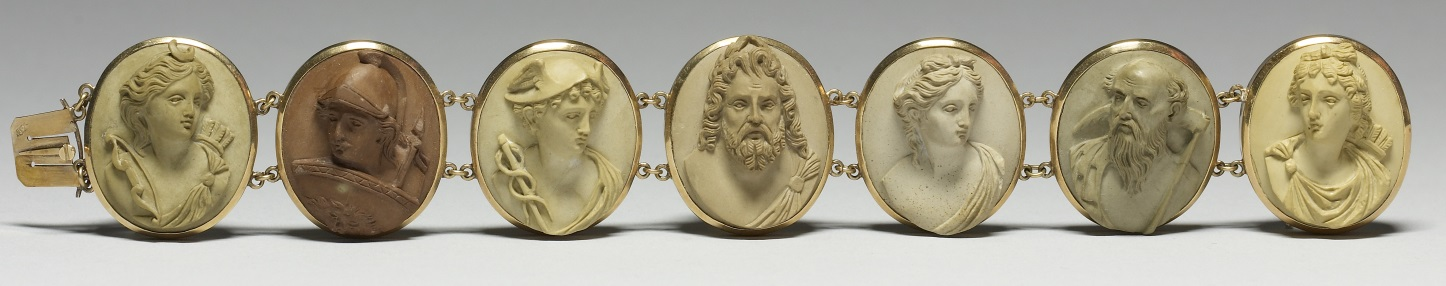
An Italian cameo bracelet representing the days of the week by their eponymous deities (mid-19th century, Walters Art Museum)

Schematic comparison of the ordering of the classical planets (arranged in a circle) and the sequence of days in the week (forming a {7/3} heptagram within the circle)

The days of the week were named for the seven classical planets, which included the Sun and Moon. This naming system persisted alongside an "ecclesiastical" tradition of numbering the days in ecclesiastical Latin beginning with Dominica (the Lord's Day) as the first day. The Greco-Roman gods associated with the classical planets were rendered in their interpretatio germanica at some point during the late Roman Empire, yielding the Germanic tradition of names based on indigenous deities.

The ordering of the weekday names is not the classical order of the planets (by distance in the planetary spheres model, which is Moon, Mercury, Venus, Sun, Mars, Jupiter, Saturn); nor, equivalently, by their apparent speed of movement in the night sky. Instead, the planetary hours systems resulted in succeeding days being named for planets that are three places apart in their traditional listing. Plutarch apparently discussed this in a treatise written c. AD 100, which is reported to have addressed the question Why are the days named after the planets reckoned in a different order from the actual order? (the text of the treatise has been lost). Dio Cassius (early 3rd century) gives two explanations in a section of his Historia Romana after mentioning the Jewish practice of sanctifying the day called the day of Kronos (Saturday).

	Sunday	Monday	Tuesday	Wednesday	Thursday	Friday	Saturday
Planet	Sun	Moon	Mars	Mercury	Jupiter	Venus	Saturn
Greco-Roman deity	Helios-Sol	Selene-Luna	Ares-Mars	Hermes-Mercury	Zeus-Jupiter	Aphrodite-Venus	Cronus-Saturn
Greek:	ἡμέρα Ἡλίου	ἡμέρα Σελήνης	ἡμέρα Ἄρεως	ἡμέρα Ἑρμοῦ	ἡμέρα Διός	ἡμέρα Ἀφροδίτης	ἡμέρα Κρόνου
Latin:	dies Sōlis	dies Lūnae	dies Martis	dies Mercuriī	dies Iovis	dies Veneris	dies Saturnī
interpretatio germanica	Sun	Moon	Tiwaz	Wodanaz	Þunraz	Frige	—
Old English	sunnandæg	mōnandæg	tiwesdæg	wōdnesdæg	þunresdæg	frīgedæg	sæterndæg

An ecclesiastical, non-astrological, system of numbering the days of the week was adopted in Late Antiquity. This model also seems to have influenced (presumably via Gothic) the designation of Wednesday as "mid-week" in Old High German (mittawehha) and Old Church Slavonic (срѣда, srěda, literally, middle day). Old Church Slavonic may have also modeled the name of Monday, понєдѣльникъ (literally, the day after Sunday), after the Latin feria Secunda.

The ecclesiastical system became prevalent in Eastern Christianity, but in the Latin West it remains extant only in modern Icelandic, Galician, and Portuguese.

	"First Day" or "Lord's Day" (Sunday)	"Second Day" (Monday)	"Third Day" (Tuesday)	"Fourth Day" (Wednesday)	"Fifth Day" (Thursday)	"Sixth Day" or "Jumu'ah" (Friday)	"Seventh Day" or "Sabbath" (Saturday)
Greek	Κυριακὴ ἡμέρα /kiriaki iméra/	Δευτέρα ἡμέρα /devtéra iméra/	Τρίτη ἡμέρα /tríti iméra/	Τετάρτη ἡμέρα /tetárti iméra/	Πέμπτη ἡμέρα /pémpti iméra/	Παρασκευὴ ἡμέρα /paraskevi iméra/	Σάββατον /sáb:aton/
Latin	[dies] dominica; rarely feria prima, feria dominica	feria secunda	feria tertia	feria quarta; rarely media septimana	feria quinta	feria sexta	Sabbatum; dies sabbatinus, dies Sabbati; rarely feria septima, feria Sabbati
Hebrew	Hebrew: יום ראשון, romanized: Yom rishon, lit. 'first day'	Hebrew: יום שני, romanized: Yom sheni, lit. 'second day'	Hebrew: יום שלישי, romanized: Yom shlishi, lit. 'third day'	Hebrew: יום רביעי, romanized: Yom revi'i, lit. 'fourth day'	Hebrew: יום חמישי, romanized: Yom chamishi, lit. 'fifth day'	Hebrew: יום שישי, romanized: Yom shishi, lit. 'sixth day'	Hebrew: שבת, romanized: Shabbat, lit. 'Rest/cessation'

== History ==
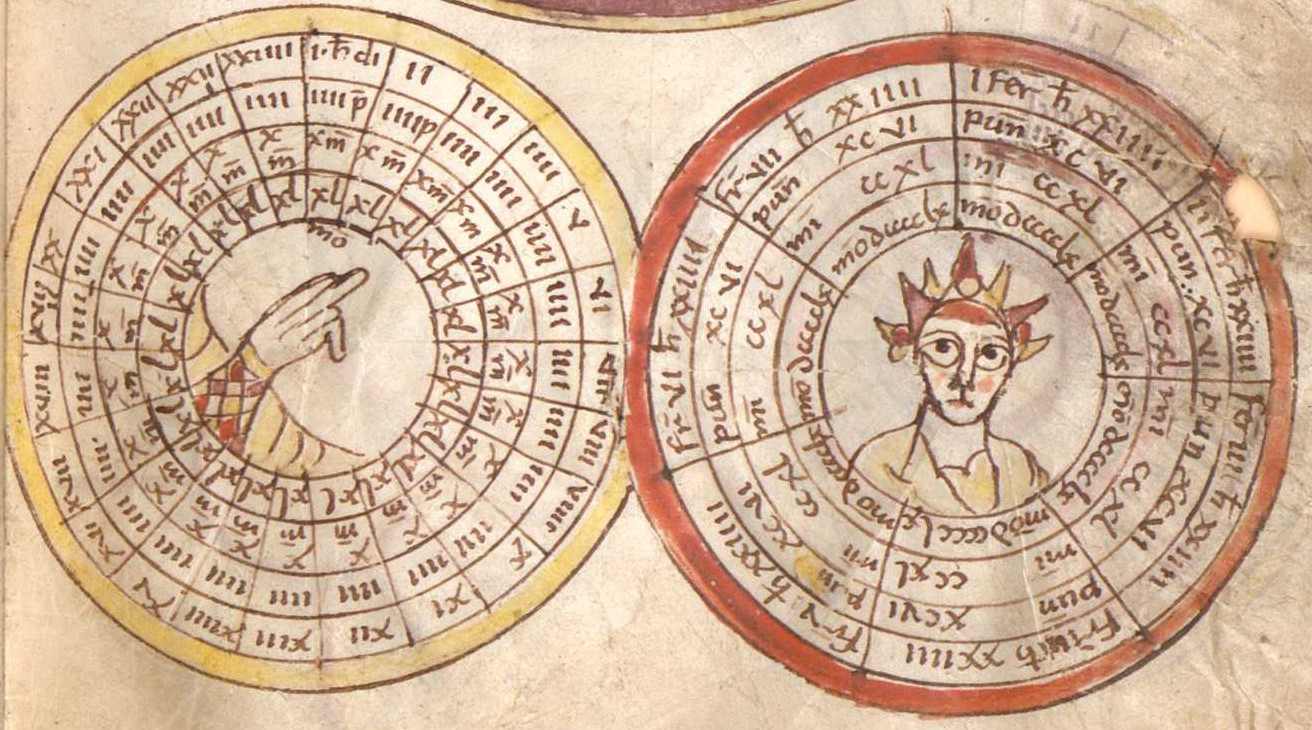
Circular diagrams showing the division of the day and of the week, from a Carolingian ms. (Clm 14456 fol. 71r) of St. Emmeram Abbey. The week is divided into seven days, and each day into 24 hours, 96 puncta (quarter-hours), 240 minuta (tenths of an hour) and 960 momenta (40th parts of an hour).

=== Ancient Near East ===
The earliest evidence of an astrological significance of a seven-day period is a decree of king Sargon of Akkad around 2300 BC. Akkadians venerated the number seven, and the key celestial bodies visible to the naked eye numbered seven (the Sun, the Moon and the five closest planets).

Gudea, the priest-king of Lagash in Sumer during the Gutian dynasty (about 2100 BC), built a seven-room temple, which he dedicated with a seven-day festival. In the flood story of the Assyro-Babylonian Epic of Gilgamesh, the storm lasts seven days, the dove is sent out after seven days (as in Genesis), and the Noah-like character of Utnapishtim leaves the ark seven days after it reaches firm ground. (Note: Copeland (1939) states as the date for Gudea "as early as 2600 BC"; the modern estimate according to the short chronology places Gudea in the 22nd century BC. By contrast, Anthony R. Michaelis claims that "the first great empire builder, King Sargon I of Akkad ([ruled] 2335 to 2279 BC [viz., middle chronology]), decreed a seven-day week in his empire. He lived for 56 years, established the first Semitic Dynasty, and defeated the Sumerian City-States. Thus the Akkadian language spread, it was adopted by the Babylonians, and the seven-day week was similarly inherited from him." The number seven is significant in Sumerian mythology.)

Counting from the new moon, the Babylonians celebrated the 7th, 14th, 21st and 28th of the approximately 29- or 30-day lunar month as "holy days", also called "evil days" (meaning inauspicious for certain activities). On those days, officials were prohibited from various activities and common men were forbidden to "make a wish", and at least the 28th was a "rest day". On each of them, offerings were made to a different god and goddess. Though similar, the later practice of associating days of the week with deities or planets is not due to the Babylonians.

Tablets from the Achaemenid period indicate that the lunation of 29 or 30 days basically contained three seven-day weeks and a final week of eight or nine days inclusive, breaking the continuous seven-day cycle. The Babylonians also celebrated the 19th as a special "evil day", the "day of anger", because it was roughly the 49th day of the (preceding) month, completing a "week of weeks", also with sacrifices and prohibitions.

=== Achaemenid Persia ===
The Zoroastrian calendar follows the Babylonian in relating the 7th, 14th, 21st, and 28th of the 29- or 30-day lunar month to Ahura Mazda. The forerunner of all modern Zoroastrian calendars is the system used to determine dates in the Persian Empire, adopted from the Babylonian calendar by the 4th century BC.

=== Judaism ===
A continuous seven-day cycle that runs throughout history without reference to the phases of the moon was first practiced in Judaism, dated to the 6th century BC at the latest.

There are several hypotheses concerning the origin of the biblical seven-day cycle.

Friedrich Delitzsch and others suggested that the seven-day week being approximately a quarter of a lunation is the implicit astronomical origin of the seven-day week, and indeed the Babylonian calendar used intercalary days to synchronize the last week of a month with the new moon. According to this theory, the Jewish week was adopted from the Babylonians while removing the moon dependency.

In his book Christian Liturgy: Catholic and Evangelical, Frank Senn points to data suggesting evidence of an early continuous use of a seven-day week, referring to Jews during the Babylonian captivity in the 6th century BC, after the destruction of the Temple of Solomon. While the seven-day week in Judaism is tied to the Creation account in the Book of Genesis in the Hebrew Bible, it is not clear whether the Genesis narrative predates the Babylonian captivity of the Jews in the 6th century BC. At least since the Second Temple period under Persian rule, Judaism utilized a seven-day cycle of recurring Sabbaths.

George Aaron Barton speculated that Genesis's seven-day creation account is connected to the Babylonian creation epic Enûma Eliš, which is recorded on seven tablets.

In a much-quoted suggestion dating to the early 20th century, the Hebrew Sabbath is compared to the Sumerian sa-bat "mid-rest", a term for the full moon. The Sumerian term has been reconstructed as rendered Sapattu^{m} or Sabattu^{m} in Babylonian, possibly present in the lost fifth tablet of the Enûma Eliš, tentatively reconstructed "[Sa]bbath shalt thou then encounter, mid[month]ly".

Eviatar Zerubavel says the Biblical Sabbath may have been inspired by Babylonian customs during the Babylonian exile of Judah. But he considers the cycle based exclusively on the Sabbath and fully independent of astronomical phenomena a Jewish innovation. In his view, "the establishment of a seven-day week based on the regular observance of the Sabbath is a distinctively Jewish contribution to civilization. The choice of the number 7 as the basis for the Jewish week might have had an Assyrian or Babylonian origin, yet it is crucial to remember that the ancient dwellers of Mesopotamia themselves did not have a seven-day week."

Niels-Erik Andreasen, Jeffrey H. Tigay, and others claim that the Biblical Sabbath is mentioned as a day of rest in some of the earliest layers of the Pentateuch dated to the 9th century BC at the latest, centuries before the Babylonian exile of Judah. They also find the resemblance between the Biblical Sabbath and the Babylonian system to be weak. Therefore, they suggest that the Sabbath, and thus the seven-day week, may reflect an independent Israelite creation. Tigay writes:

It is clear that among neighboring nations that were in position to have an influence over Israel – and in fact which did influence it in various matters – there is no precise parallel to the Israelite Sabbatical week. This leads to the conclusion that the Sabbatical week, which is as unique to Israel as the Sabbath from which it flows, is an independent Israelite creation.

Further difficulties with Friedrich Delitzsch's origin theory connecting the Hebrew Shabbat with the Babylonian lunar cycle include reconciling the differences between an unbroken week and a lunar week, and explaining the absence of texts naming the lunar week as Shabbat in any language.

In Jewish sources by the time of the Septuagint, the term "Sabbath" also came to refer by synecdoche to an entire seven-day week, the interval between two weekly Sabbaths. Jesus's parable of the Pharisee and the Publican says the Pharisee fasts "twice in the week". In the account of the women finding the tomb empty, they are described as coming there "toward the one of the sabbaths"; translations substitute "week" for "sabbaths".

As Jews settled in different parts of the Roman Empire, their customs became widely known and Roman authors such as Seneca and Ovid mention the Jewish Sabbath.

=== Hellenistic and Roman era ===
The ancient Romans traditionally used the eight-day nundinum. But after the Julian calendar came into effect in 45 BC, the seven-day astrological or planetary week came into increasing use. It associated the days of the week with the Sun, the Moon, and the five planets visible to the naked eye. The astrological concept of planetary hours is an innovation of Hellenistic astrology, probably first conceived in the 2nd century BC. Accordingly, the origin of the planetary week has traditionally been thought to be Hellenistic, as stated e.g. by Eviatar Zerubavel. But Ilaria Bultrighini and Sascha Stern have argued that the custom seems to have appeared earlier in Roman Italy. They also speculate that the idea may have been loosely inspired by the Romans' knowledge of the Jewish week. The seven-day week was widely known throughout the Roman Empire by the 1st century AD. For a while, the week and the nundinal cycle coexisted, but by the time Constantine officially adopted the week in AD 321 and the Day of the Sun (dies Solis) was made a legal holiday, the nundinal cycle had fallen out of use.

The continuous seven-day cycle of the days of the week dates to the reign of Augustus; the first identifiable date cited complete with day of the week is 6 February AD 60, identified as a Sunday (as viii idus Februarius dies solis "eighth day before the ides of February, day of the Sun") in a Pompeiian graffito. But according to the (contemporary) Julian calendar, 6 February 60 was a Wednesday. This is explained by the existence of two conventions of naming days of the weeks based on the planetary hours system: 6 February was a Sunday by the sunset naming convention and a Wednesday by the sunrise naming convention.

=== Christian Europe ===
The seven-day weekly cycle has remained unbroken in Christendom, and hence in Western history, for almost two millennia, despite changes to the Coptic, Julian, and Gregorian calendars, demonstrated by the date of Easter Sunday having been traced back through numerous computistic tables to an Ethiopic copy of an early Alexandrian table beginning with the Easter of AD 311.

A tradition of divinations arranged for the days of the week on which certain feast days occur developed in the early Middle Ages. Later variants included the German Bauern-Praktik and the versions of Erra Pater published in 16th- to 17th-century England, mocked in Samuel Butler's Hudibras. South and East Slavic versions are known as koliadniki (from koliada, a loan of Latin calendae), with Bulgarian copies dating to the 13th century and Serbian versions to the 14th century.

Medieval Christian traditions associated with the lucky or unlucky nature of certain days of the week survived into the modern period. This concerns primarily Friday, associated with the crucifixion of Jesus. Sunday, sometimes personified as Saint Anastasia, was itself an object of worship in Russia, a practice denounced in a sermon extant in copies dating to the 14th century.

In the ecclesiastical numbering system, Sunday also counted as the feria prima, or first day of the week; at the same time, it figures as the "eighth day" and has occasionally been so called in Christian liturgy. (Note: This is just a reflection of the system of ordinal numbers in the Greek and Latin languages, where today is the "first" day, tomorrow the "second" day, etc. Compare the nundinal cycle (literally "nine-days" cycle, describing an eight-day week) of the Roman calendar, or the Resurrection of Jesus (after a period of less than 48 hours) being described (in texts derived from Latin) as happening on the "third day".)

Justin Martyr wrote: "the first day after the Sabbath, remaining the first of all the days, is called, however, the eighth, according to the number of all the days of the cycle, and [yet] remains the first."

A period of eight days, usually (but not always, mainly because of Christmas Day) starting and ending on a Sunday, is called an octave, particularly in Roman Catholic liturgy. In German, the phrase heute in acht Tagen (literally "today in eight days") can also mean "one week from today" (i.e., on the same weekday). The same is true of the Italian phrase oggi otto (literally "today eight"), the French à huitaine, and the Spanish de hoy en ocho.

=== Adoption in Asia ===
==== China and Japan ====
The earliest known reference in Chinese writings to a seven-day week is attributed to Fan Ning, who lived in the late 4th century in the Jin dynasty, while diffusions from the Manichaeans are documented with the writings of the Chinese Buddhist monk Yi Jing and the Ceylonese or Central Asian Buddhist monk Bu Kong of the 7th century (Tang dynasty). (Note: It was transmitted to China in the 8th century by Manichaeans, via the country of Kang (a Central Asian polity near Samarkand). Tang-era adoption is documented in the writings of the Chinese Buddhist monk Yi Jing and the Ceylonese Buddhist monk Bu Kong. According to the Chinese encyclopedia Cihai, there is some evidence that the system had been adopted twice, the first time already in the 4th century (Jin dynasty), based on a reference by a Jin-era astrologer, Fan Ning. The Cihai under the entry for "seven luminaries calendar" has: method of recording days according to the seven luminaries [七曜 qī yào]. China normally observes the following order: Sun, Moon, Mars, Mercury, Jupiter, Venus, and Saturn. Seven days make one week, which is repeated in a cycle. Originated in ancient Babylon (or ancient Egypt according to one theory). Used by the Romans at the time of the 1st century AD, later transmitted to other countries. This method existed in China in the 4th century. It was also transmitted to China by Manichaeans in the 8th century from the country of Kang (康) in Central Asia.) However, the official rest days were instead organized according to 5-day (Han to Sui dynasties) or 10-day (Sui to Yuan dynasties) cycles, or seasonal long breaks (Ming and Qing dynasties); the 7-day cycle for rest days was only officially instituted in the Republican era.

The Chinese variant of the planetary system was brought to Japan in the 9th century by the Japanese monk Kūkai. Surviving diaries of the Japanese statesman Fujiwara Michinaga show the seven-day system in use in Heian period Japan as early as 1007. In Japan, the seven-day system was kept in use for astrological purposes until its promotion to a full-fledged Western-style calendrical basis during the Meiji period (1868–1912).

==== India ====
The seven-day week was known in India by the 6th century, referenced in the Pañcasiddhāntikā. Shashi (2000) mentions the Garga Samhita, which he places in the 1st century BC or AD, as a possible earlier reference to a seven-day week in India. He concludes: "the above references furnish a terminus ad quem (viz. 1st century). The terminus a quo cannot be stated with certainty".

=== Islamic concept ===
According to Islam, the seven-day week started with the creation of the universe by Allah. Abu Huraira reported that Muhammad said: "Allah, the Exalted and Glorious, created the clay on Saturday and He created the mountains on Sunday and He created the trees on Monday and He created the things entailing labour on Tuesday and created light on Wednesday and He caused the animals to spread on Thursday and created Adam after 'Asr on Friday; the last creation at the last hour of the hours of Friday, i.e., between afternoon and night."

== Numbering ==
Weeks in a Gregorian calendar year can be numbered for each year. This style of numbering is often used in European and Asian countries. It is less common in the U.S. and elsewhere.

=== ISO week date system ===
The system for numbering weeks is the ISO week date system, which is included in ISO 8601. This system dictates that each week begins on a Monday and is associated with the year that contains that week's Thursday.

==== Determining Week 1 ====
In practice week 1 (W01 in ISO notation) of any year can be determined as follows:

- If 1 January falls on a Monday, Tuesday, Wednesday or Thursday, then the week of 1 January is Week 1. Except in the case of 1 January falling on a Monday, this Week 1 includes the last day(s) of the previous year.
- If 1 January falls on a Friday, Saturday, or Sunday, then 1 January is considered to be part of the last week of the previous year. Week 1 will begin on the first Monday after 1 January.

Examples:

- Week 1 of 2015 (2015W01 in ISO notation) started on Monday, 29 December 2014 and ended on Sunday, 4 January 2015, because 1 January 2015 fell on Thursday.
- Week 1 of 2021 (2021W01 in ISO notation) started on Monday, 4 January 2021 and ended on Sunday, 10 January 2021, because 1 January 2021 fell on Friday.

==== Week 52 and 53 ====
It is also possible to determine if the last week of the previous year was Week 52 or Week 53 as follows:

- If 1 January falls on a Friday, then it is part of Week 53 of the previous year (W53-5).
- If 1 January falls on a Saturday,
  - then it is part of Week 53 of the previous year if that is a leap year (W53-6),
  - and part of Week 52 otherwise (W52-6), i.e. if the previous year is a common year.
- If 1 January falls on a Sunday, then it is part of Week 52 of the previous year (W52-7).

==== Schematic representation of ISO week date ====
Dominical letter(s) plus weekdays, dates and week numbers at the beginning and end of a year
Dominical letter(s)^{1}	Days at the start of January							Effect^{1,2}				Days at the end of December^{1}						
Dominical letter(s)^{1}	1 Mon	2 Tue	3 Wed	4 Thu	5 Fri	6 Sat	7 Sun	W01-1^{3}	01 Jan week	...	31 Dec week	1 Mon^{4}	2 Tue	3 Wed	4 Thu	5 Fri	6 Sat	7 Sun
G(F)	01	02	03	04	05	06	07	01 Jan	W01	...	W01	31 (30)	(31)					
F(E)		01	02	03	04	05	06	31 Dec	W01	...	W01	30 (29)	31 (30)	(31)				
E(D)			01	02	03	04	05	30 Dec	W01	...	W01 (W53)	29 (28)	30 (29)	31 (30)	(31)			
D(C)				01	02	03	04	29 Dec	W01	...	W53	28 (27)	29 (28)	30 (29)	31 (30)	(31)		
C(B)					01	02	03	04 Jan	W53	...	W52	27 (26)	28 (27)	29 (28)	30 (29)	31 (30)	(31)	
B(A)						01	02	03 Jan	W52 (W53)	...	W52	26 (25)	27 (26)	28 (27)	29 (28)	30 (29)	31 (30)	(31)
A(G)							01	02 Jan	W52	...	W52 (W01)	25 (31)	26 (25)	27 (26)	28 (27)	29 (28)	30 (29)	31 (30)

Notes
1. Numbers and letters in parentheses, ( ), apply to March − December in leap years.
2. Underlined numbers and letters belong to previous year or next year.
3. First date of the first week in the year.
4. First date of the last week in the year.

=== Other week numbering systems ===
In some countries, the numbering system differs from the ISO standard. At least six numberings are in use:

System	First day of week	First week of year contains			Can be last week of previous year	Used by or in
ISO 8601	Monday	4 January	1st Thursday	4–7 days of year	yes	EU (exc. Portugal) and most other European countries, most of Asia and Oceania
Middle Eastern	Saturday	1 January	1st Friday	1–7 days of year	yes	Much of the Middle East
Western traditional	Sunday	1 January	1st Saturday	1–7 days of year	yes	Canada, United States, Iceland, Portugal, Japan, Taiwan, Thailand, Hong Kong, Macau, Israel, Egypt, South Africa, the Philippines, and most of Latin America
Broadcast Calendar	Monday	1 January	1st Sunday	1–7 days of year	yes	Broadcast services in the United States

Because the week starts on either Saturday, Sunday, or Monday in all these systems, the days in a workweek, Monday through Friday, always have the same week number within a calendar week system. Quite often, these systems agree on the week number for each day in a workweek:

- In years where 1 January is a Monday, Tuesday, Wednesday, or Thursday, all of the above week numbering systems will agree.
- In years where 1 January is a Friday, ISO-8601 will be different, but the rest will agree.
- In years where 1 January is a Saturday, ISO-8601 and the Middle Eastern system will agree, being different from Western Traditional and the Broadcast Calendar which will agree.
- In years where 1 January is a Sunday, the Broadcast Calendar will be different, but the rest will agree.

Note that this agreement occurs only for the week number of each day in a work week, not for the day number within the week or the week number of the weekends.

The epi week (epidemiological week) is used to report healthcare statistics, as with COVID-19 cases:

The epidemiological week begins on Sunday and ends on Saturday. The first epidemiological week of the year ends on the first Saturday of January, provided that it falls at least four or more days into the month. Therefore, the first epidemiological week may actually begin in December of the previous year.

==== Uses ====
The semiconductor package date code is often a four-digit date code YYWW, where the first two digits YY are the last two digits of the calendar year and the last two digits WW are the two-digit week number.

The tire date code mandated by the US DOT is a four-digit date code WWYY with two digits of the week number WW followed by the last two digits of the calendar year YY.

== "Weeks" in other calendars ==
The term "week" is sometimes expanded to refer to other time units comprising a few days. Such "weeks" of between four and ten days have historically been used in various places. Intervals longer than 10 days are not usually termed "weeks", as they are closer in length to a fortnight or month than to a seven-day week.

=== Pre-modern ===
Calendars unrelated to the Chaldean, Hellenistic, Christian, or Jewish traditions often have time cycles between the day and the month of varying lengths, sometimes also called "weeks".

An eight-day week was used in Ancient Rome and possibly in the pre-Christian Celtic calendar. Traces of a nine-day week are found in Baltic languages and in Welsh. The ancient Chinese calendar had a ten-day week, as did the ancient Egyptian calendar (and, incidentally, the French Republican Calendar, dividing its 30-day months into thirds).

Some cultures in Ghana and Nigeria have maintained market day cycles based on a four-day weeks and eight-weeks cycles. Different communities have adopted different practices in relation to the adoption of the seven-day week found in Islamic and Christian calendars.

A six-day week was used in the Akan calendar and Kabiye culture in West Africa until 1981. Several cultures used a five-day week, including the Javanese calendar and the traditional cycle of market days in Korea. The Igbo have a "market week" of four days. Evidence of a "three-day week" has been derived from the names of the days of the week in Guipuscoan Basque.

The Aztecs and Mayas used the Mesoamerican calendars. The most important of these divided a ritual cycle of 260 days (known as Tonalpohualli in Nahuatl and Tzolk'in in Yucatec Maya) into 20 weeks of 13 days (known in Spanish as trecenas). They also divided the solar year into 18 periods (winal) of 20 days and five nameless days (wayebʼ), creating a 20-day month divided into four five-day weeks. The end of each five-day week was a market day.

The Balinese Pawukon is a 210-day calendar consisting of 10 different simultaneously running weeks of 1, 2, 3, 4, 5, 6, 7, 8, 9, and 10 days, of which the weeks of 4, 8, and 9 days are interrupted to fit into the 210-day cycle.

=== Modern reforms ===
The International Fixed Calendar (also known as the "Eastman plan") kept a seven-day week while defining a year of 13 months with 28 days each (364 days). Every calendar date was always on the same weekday.

A 10-day week, called a décade, was used in Revolutionary France for nine and a half years, from October 1793 to April 1802. The Paris Commune adopted this calendar for 18 days in 1871.

The Bahá'í calendar features a 19-day period that some classify as a month and others as a week.

==== Soviet ====
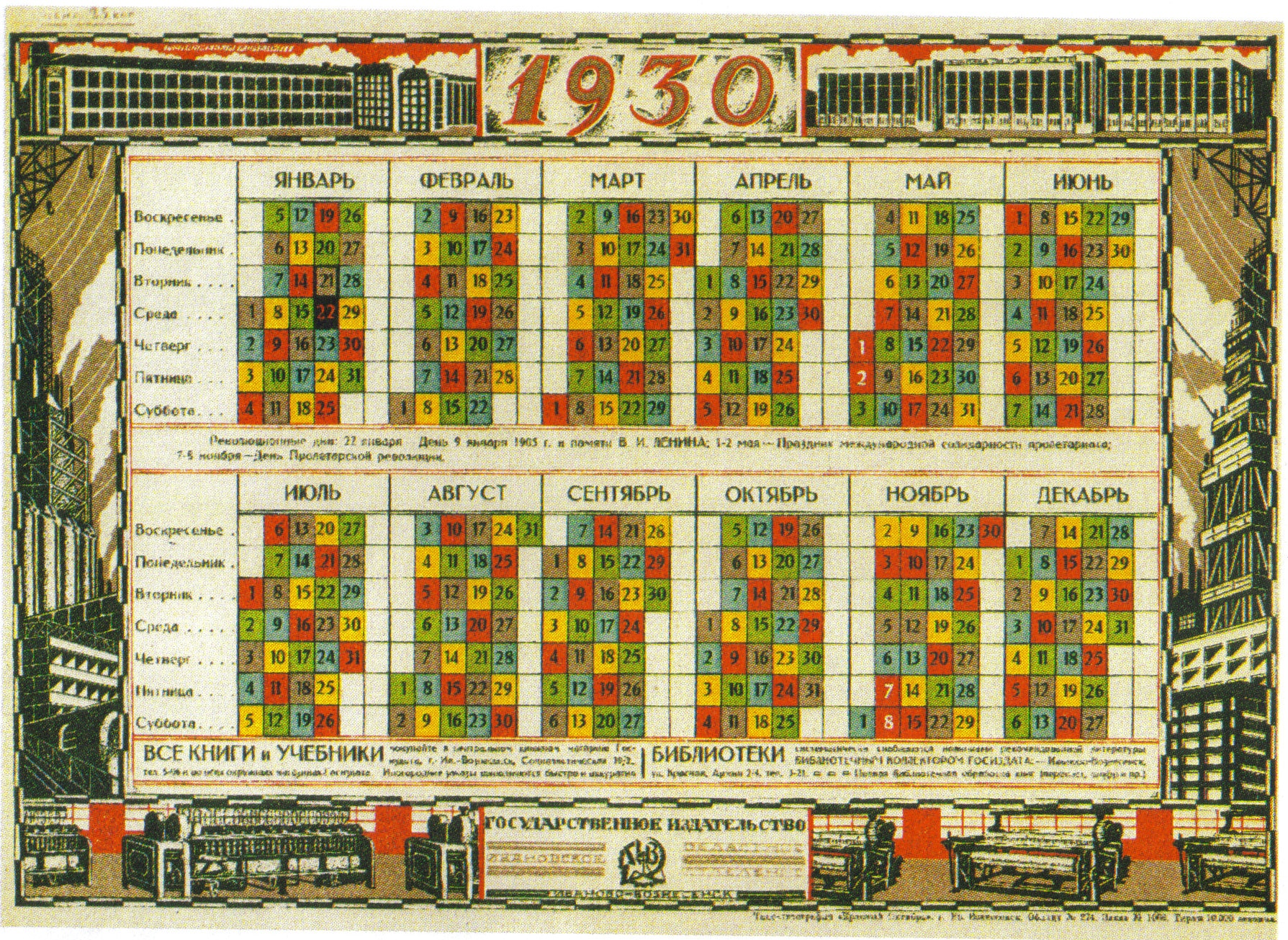
Soviet calendar, 1930.
Five colors of five-day work week repeat.

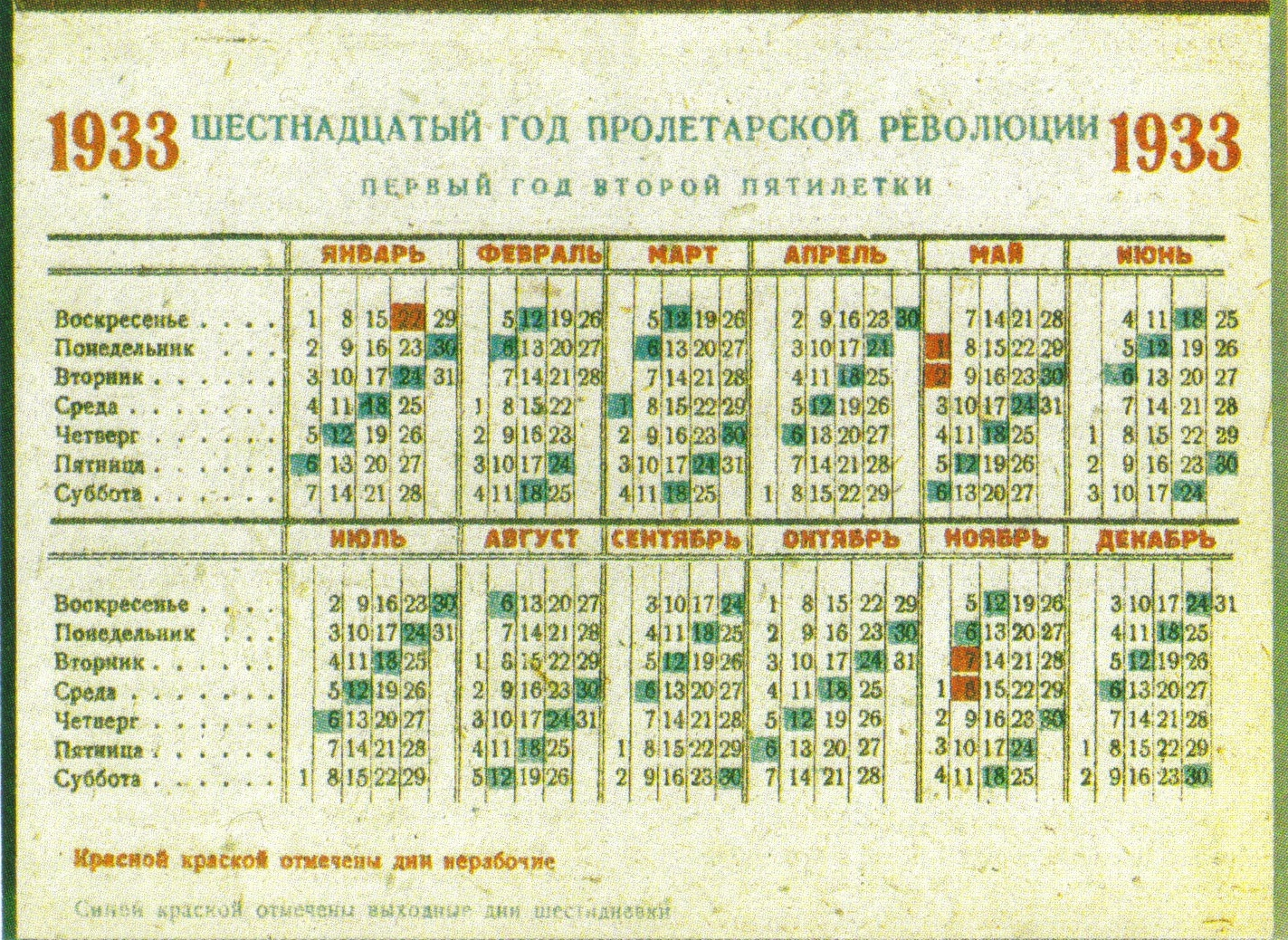
Soviet calendar, 1933.
Rest day of six-day work week in blue.

Days of each Gregorian month in both calendars are grouped vertically into seven-day weeks.

In the Soviet Union between 1929 and 1940, most factory and enterprise workers, but not collective farm workers, used five- and six-day work weeks while the country as a whole continued to use the traditional seven-day week.

From 1929 to 1951, five national holidays were days of rest (22 January, 1–2 May, 7–8 November). From autumn 1929 to summer 1931, the remaining 360 days of the year were subdivided into 72 five-day work weeks beginning on 1 January. Workers were assigned one of the five days as their day off, even if their spouse or friends were assigned a different day off. Peak use of the five-day work week occurred on 1 October 1930 at 72% of industrial workers. From summer 1931 until 26 June 1940, each Gregorian month was subdivided into five six-day work weeks, more or less, beginning with the first day of each month. The sixth day of each work week was a uniform day of rest. On 1 July 1935 74.2% of industrial workers were on non-continuous schedules, mostly six-day work weeks, while 25.8% were still on continuous schedules, mostly five-day work weeks. The Gregorian calendar with its irregular month lengths and traditional seven-day week was used in the Soviet Union during its entire existence, including 1929–1940; for example, in the masthead of Pravda, the official Communist newspaper, and in both Soviet calendars displayed here. The traditional names of the seven-day week continued to be used, including "Resurrection" (Воскресенье) for Sunday and "Sabbath" (Суббота) for Saturday, despite the government's official atheism.

== See also ==
- Determination of the day of the week
- Babylonian calendar
- GPS week number
- Names of the days of the week
- Workweek and weekend
- Days-in-a-week debate
