= Origo (album) =

Studio album by Burst
- Released: October 17, 2005
- Recorded: Studio Music-a-matic Gothenburg, Sweden
- Genre: Progressive metal, post-metal, post-hardcore
- Length: 48:48
- Label: Relapse Records (RR 6657-2)
- Producer: Fredrik Reinedahl, Henryk Lipp and Burst

Burst chronology
Prey on Life (2003)	Origo (2005)	Lazarus Bird (2008)

Professional ratings
Review scores
Source	Rating
AllMusic	4/5 stars
Alternative Press	(4/5)
Blabbermouth	(8.5/10)
PopMatters	(8/10)

Origo is the fourth full-length album by the Swedish progressive metal band Burst, released on October 17, 2005, by Relapse Records. Aaron Burgess, writing for Alternative Press described the album as "a blistering epic, complete with keyboards, acoustic passages and female backing vocals in tow". He added that "Burst sound ready to, well, burst out of obscurity and into the genre-shattering realm of fellow post-metal masters Isis, Neurosis and Cult Of Luna". Speaking of the album's sound, wrote, "Though frontman Linus Jägerskog's shearing vocals are terminally locked on overdrive, the rest of Origo is a sweeping, time-shifting exploration of dynamics, moods and tonal color--and while "beautiful" isn't usually the sort of adjective we like to throw at a metal record, in this case, it's the rule, not the exception."

== Track listing ==
No.	Title	Length
1.	"Where the Wave Broke"	3:36
2.	"Sever"	5:11
3.	"The Immateria"	5:22
4.	"Slave Emotion"	3:30
5.	"Flight's End"	5:13
6.	"Homebound"	6:35
7.	"It Comes into View"	6:56
8.	"Stormwielder"	5:03
9.	"Mercy Liberation"	5:22

== Personnel ==
Band members

- Patrik Hultin – drums
- Linus Jägerskog – vocals
- Jesper Liveröd – bass guitar and vocals
- Robert Reinholdz – guitar and vocals
- Jonas Rydberg – guitar

Other personnel

- Robert Johansson – photography
- Henryk Lipp – production
- Fredrik Reinedahl – production
- Wieslaw Walkuski – album artwork
