= Conquest: Writhe =

Studio album by Burst
- Released: 2001
- Recorded: Studio Zalt Kristinehamn, Sweden
- Genre: Hardcore punk
- Length: 36:01
- Label: Prank Records
- Producer: Fredrik Reinedahl

Burst chronology
Two Faced (1998)	Conquest: Writhe (2001)	Prey on Life (2003)

Conquest: Writhe is the second full-length album from Swedish progressive metal band Burst. It was released in 2001.

== Track listing ==
No.	Title	Length
1.	"Sordid Leader"	3:30
2.	"Juxtaposed"	4:19
3.	"Conquest: Writhe"	2:36
4.	"Promised Faith"	3:47
5.	"Misconception"	3:01
6.	"The World Denied"	3:30
7.	"Nefarious"	2:19
8.	"Numbed by the Vision"	2:53
9.	"A New Beginning"	3:10
10.	"Decomposed" (Merzbow remix)	3:23
11.	"Scrape" (Unsane cover)	3:33

== Personnel ==
Burst

- Linus Jägerskog - Vocals
- Patrik Hultin - Drums, Vocals
- Jesper Liveröd - Bass, Vocals
- Robert Reinholdz - Guitars, Vocals
- Jonas Rydberg - Guitars

Production

- Jesper Liveröd - Lyrics
- Andreas Hedberg - Photography
- Per Almqvist - Artwork, Design
- Fredrik Reinedahl - Producer, Mixing, Engineering
- Jonas Rydberg - Lyrics (Tracks 5, 6, 7)
