= Moment =

Moment or Moments may refer to:

== Science ==
- Moment (mathematics), a concept in probability theory and statistics
- Moment (physics), a combination of a physical quantity and a distance
  - Moment of force or torque

=== Time ===
- Present time
- An instant
- Moment (unit), a medieval unit of time

=== Technology ===
- Moment space surveillance complex, a Russian military apparatus
- Samsung M900 Moment, an Android phone

== Arts ==
=== Film and television ===
- Moment (film), a 1978 Yugoslav film
- Moments (1974 film), a British drama starring Angharad Rees
- Moments (1979 film), a French-Israeli film
- Moments (talk show), a Philippine TV celebrity talk show
- Moments, the official film of the 2023 FIFA Women's World Cup

=== Music and dance ===
- Moment form, a musical concept developed by Karlheinz Stockhausen
- Moment Rustica (ballet), a Martha Graham ballet
- Momente or Moments, a musical composition by Stockhausen
- The Moments, American R&B vocal group

==== Albums ====
- A Moment, a 1994 album by Lalah Hathaway
- Moment (Dark Tranquillity album), 2020
- Moment (Speed album), 1998
- Moment (EP), a 2019 EP by Peggy Gou
- Moments (Darude album), 2015
- Moments (Christine Guldbrandsen album), 2004
- Moments (Mark Holden album), 1995
- Moments (Leo Ku album), 2007
- Moments (Barbara Mandrell album), 1986
- Moments (Andrew Rayel album), 2017
- Moments (Boz Scaggs album), 1971
- Moments, a 2015 album by Maudy Ayunda
- Moments (Cut Copy album), 2025

==== Songs ====
- "Moment" (Blanche song), 2018
- "Moment" (SMAP song), 2012
- "Moments", a song by Westlife from Westlife, 1999
- "Moment", a song by Aiden from Conviction, 2007
- "Moment", a song by Young Money from Young Money: Rise of an Empire, featuring Lil Wayne, 2014
- "Moment", a song by Victoria Monét from Jaguar, 2020
- "Moments" (Ayumi Hamasaki song), 2004
- "Moments" (Emerson Drive song), 2007
- "Moments" (Hans Bollandsås song), 2010
- "Moments" (One Direction song), 2011
- "Moments" (Tove Lo song), 2014
- "Moments" (Freddy Verano song), 2015
- "Lost in the Moment", a song by NF from Therapy Session, featuring Jonathan Thulin, 2016

=== Publications and literature ===
- Moment (magazine), an American Jewish publication
- "Moments" (poem), a poem wrongly attributed to Jorge Luis Borges

== See also ==
- Momentum (disambiguation)
- The Moment (disambiguation)
- Theory of moments
