= Oktav =

National religious festival of Luxembourg

Muttergottesoktav
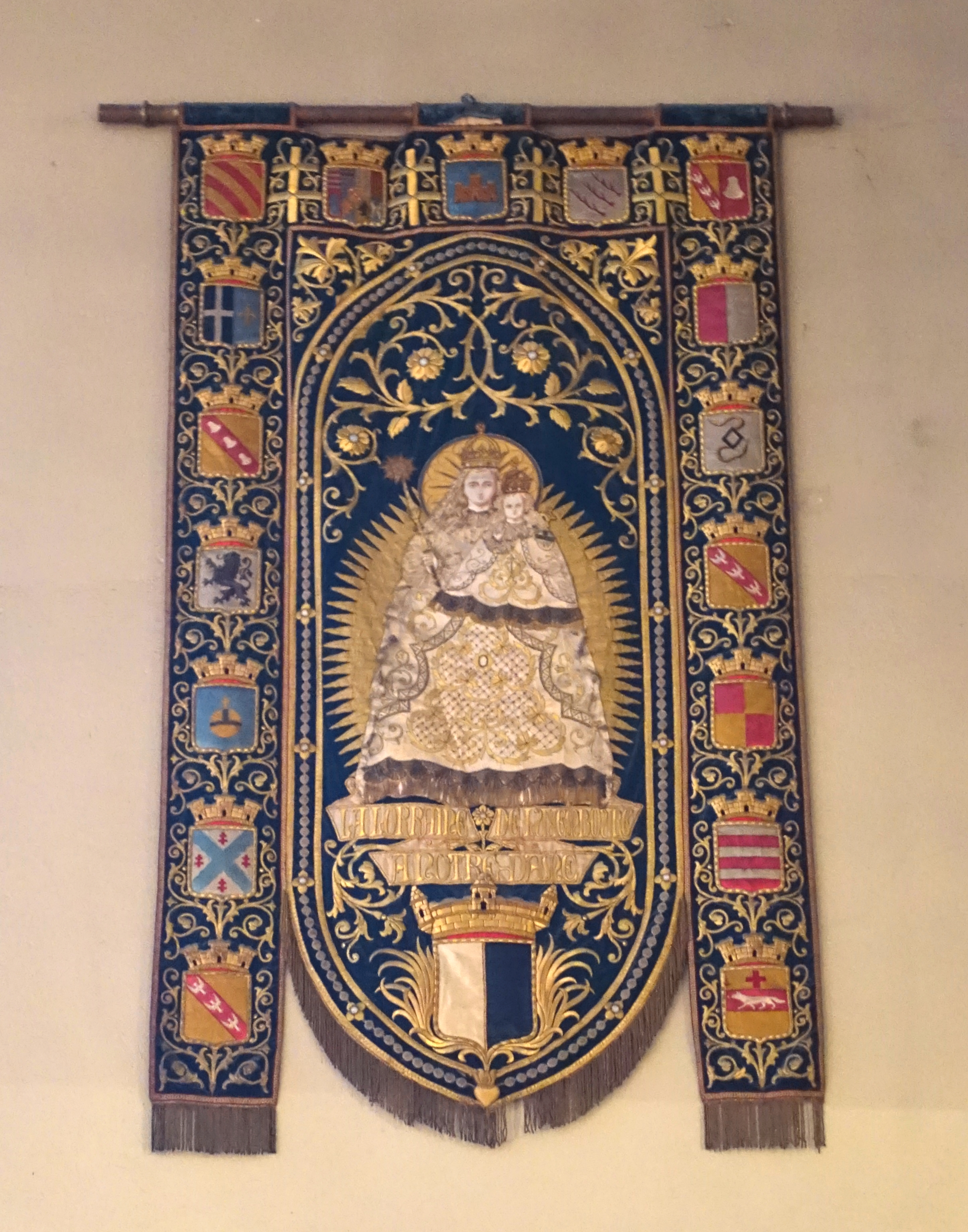
- Banner of Our Lady of Luxembourg
- Also called: Oktav
- Observed by: Grand Duchy of Luxembourg; Belgian province of Luxembourg; Lorraine
- Liturgical color: Blue and Gold
- Type: Christian
- Celebrations: Votive masses Eucharistic Procession; Pontifical High Mass; Consecration to Our Lady
- Date: From 3rd Sunday after Easter and closes to the 5th Sunday after Easter
- 2024 date: April 22 – May 5
- 2025 date: May 12 – May 25
- 2026 date: April 27 – May 10
- 2027 date: April 19 – May 2
- Frequency: Annual
- First time: 10 May 1666; 359 years ago
- Started by: Jacques Broquart S.J.
- Related to: Month of Mary

The Oktav or Muttergottesoktav (German for Octave of the Mother of God) is a religious double-octave celebrated in honour of the Blessed Virgin Mary as one of the oldest and major annual religious celebrations of the Grand-Duchy of Luxembourg. It starts on the 3rd Sunday after Easter and closes with the Octave Procession on the 5th Sunday after Easter during the Month of Mary. It honours Our Lady of Luxembourg, Maria Mutter Jesu, Consolatrix Afflictorum, Patrona Civitatis et Patriae Luxemburgensis.

== History ==
=== Overcoming the joint trauma of the plague and the Thirty Years War ===
At the beginning of the 17th century, the political, social and religious environment of the Grand Duchy of Luxembourg was severely impacted by the Thirty Years War (1618-1648) and the years of the Plague (1626-1636), from which two thirds of the population died.

In this context, the Jesuits arrived to Luxembourg on 1 October 1603, they started building their church between 1613 and 1621. Built in honour of the Blessed Virgin Mary in hope of countering the Protestant influences in the region in the spirit of the Counter-Reformation of the Council of Trent (1545-1563), it would become Notre-Dame Cathedral in 1870.

The tradition of the procession of the Oktav began with a Marian procession on the feast of the Immaculate Conception on 8 December 1624. Students from the Jesuit college carried a wooden, 73 cm-high statue of the Virgin Mary in front of the city walls on the Glacis. Father Jacques Brocquart S.J. was the initiator of this pilgrimage, and gave the statue the title of Consolatrix Afflictorum (Comforter of the Afflicted). Popular tradition links the consolation to two miraculous occurrences which happened during those years in Luxembourg related first to the plague, and the high mortality rate it inflicted on children, and secondly, the Thirty Years War: namely, the miracle of the resurrection of a dead child and a miraculous flood which protected the city from invasion, which ruined the plan of Frenchman Pierre Pillard to dynamite a breach through the walls of the city.

From 1625 to 1628, the pilgrim's chapel was built on the Glacis, to be enlarged in 1640, and reconsecrated in 1642. On 10 May 1666, Mary, Mother of Jesus, Comforter of the Afflicted, was elected the patroness of the City of Luxembourg and on 20 February 1678, the Comforter of the Afflicted was elected patroness of the Duchy of Luxembourg and of the County of Chiny. By a brief of 26 May 1679, Pope Innocent XI first granted the plenary indulgence during the whole Oktav.

=== Surviving through times of uncertainty from the suppression of the Jesuits to the French Revolution ===
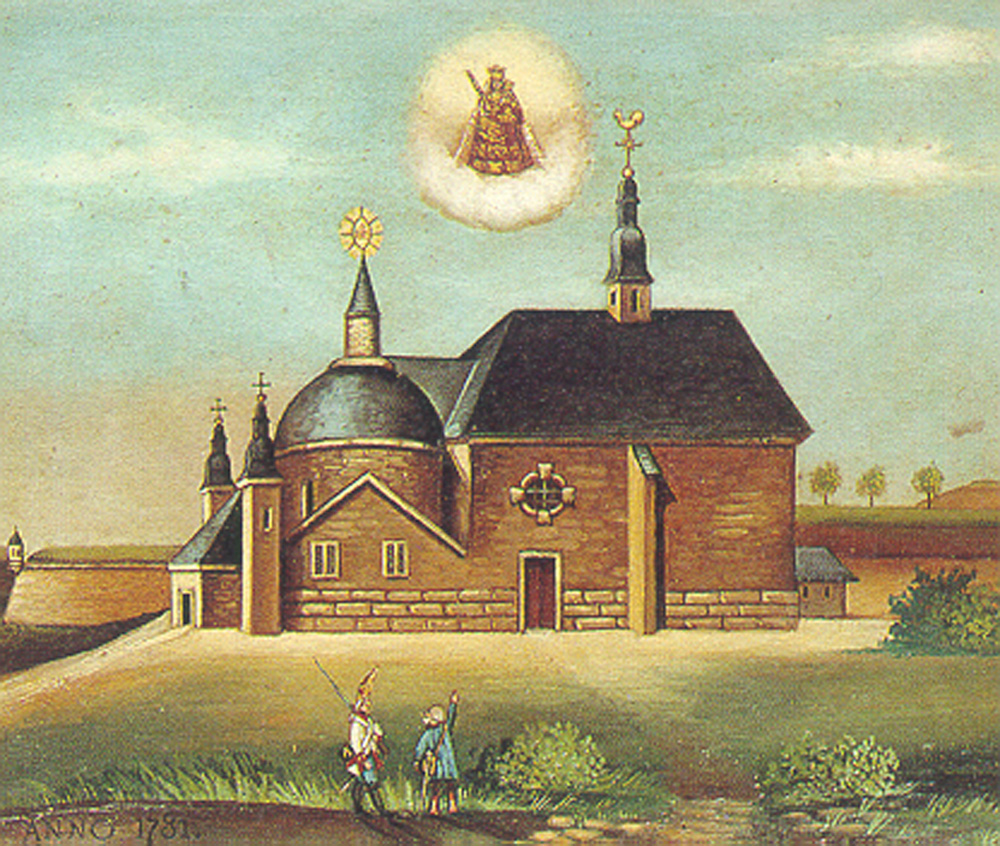
A popular representation of the New Gate Chapel, in 1781.

1766 marked the first centenary of the celebration of the Oktav. On that occasion, a cast-iron votive altar from the smithy of Orval Abbey was given by the people of Luxembourg to their patroness. In 1769, a standardized novena in honour of Our Lady of Luxembourg invoked under the title of Our Lady of Consolation was published in order to encourage the popular devotion.

However, the situation was soon to be in jeopardy, as the Jesuits, who had initiated this Marian tradition, were dissolved by Pope Clement XIV in 1773. In 1778, the Jesuit church became the parish church was the tradition continued until 1796 when the pilgrims' chapel on the Glacis was destroyed by French Revolutionary troops.

=== Restoring the glory of Our Lady of Luxembourg as a national emblem ===
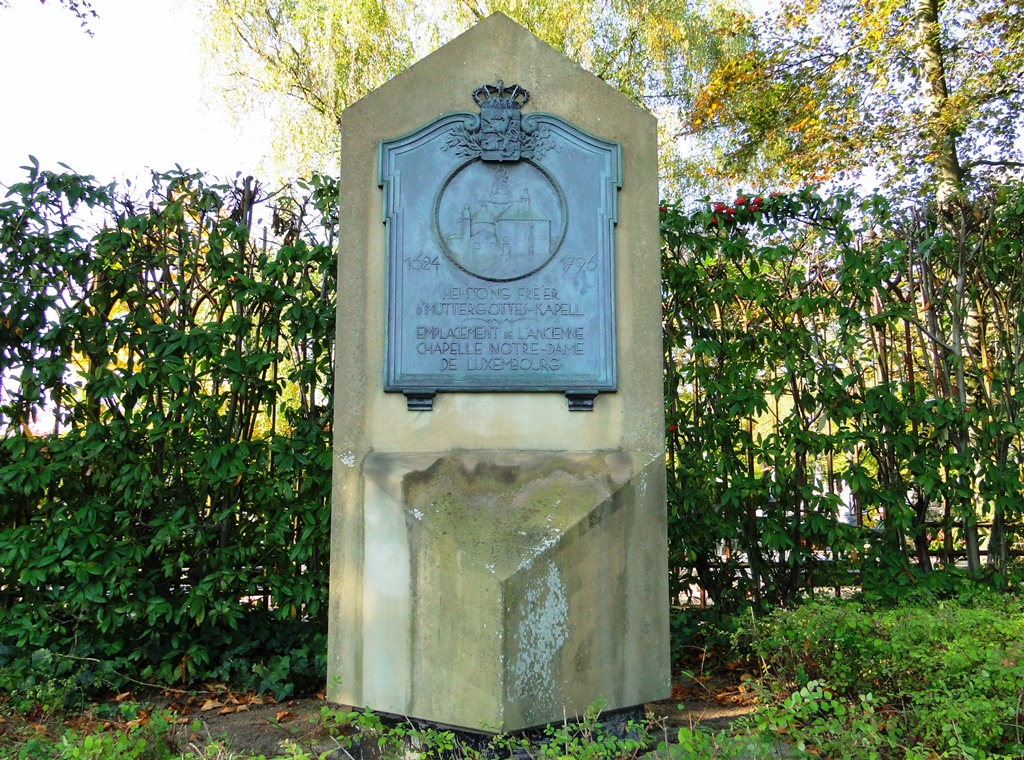
This bronze plaque, executed by Michel Haagen, marks the approximate location of the former Glacis chapel (1625-1796) which, housing the statue of the Virgin until 1794, was the place of origin of pilgrimages to the Oktav. The plaque representing the old chapel was inaugurated on October 13, 1935.

After the French Revolution, the Oktav was restored and grow in pump and circumstance through the 19th century, especially through the participation of the participation of the royal family after the conversion to Catholicism of Grand Duke William IV of Luxembourg. This celebration contributed to building the identity of Luxembourg as a nation-state with its capital as Luxembourg city: as historian James Newcomer notes, "this veneration and observation gave still more character to Luxembourg City as the capital of the nation".

Specially composed litanies and hymns, first in German, then also in Luxembourgish, gave the Octave a new imprint since the end of the 19th century and give it an increasingly marked national dimension. In 1866, for the second centenary of the Oktav, the statue was ceremonially crowned with permission of Pope Pius IX. In 1870, Luxembourg became a bishopric, and the old Jesuit church became the cathedral where the devotional statue was venerated and the Oktav celebrated.

In 1921, Bishop Pierre Nommesch decided to make up for the 250th anniversary of the election of the patroness with a peace and anniversary Oktav, since the celebrations had not taken place in 1916 due to World War I and the poor health of his predecessor Bishop Jean Joseph Koppes. He also doubled the length of the Octave, as one week was no longer enough to accommodate all parishes and associations. The octave was expanded into a double octave "in special recognition of [the Virgin Mary's] efforts during the period 1914-1918".

During World War II, the Oktav took on a national character as it became a symbol of national resistance against the religious persecution of the German policy of Kulturkampf. Its patriotic meaning contributed again to the religious identity of Luxembourg. On the anniversary of the consecration of the city of Luxembourg to the Virgin first made on 10 October 1666, a national census was held on 10 October 1941 to endorse the Nazi policy of Heim ins Reich; its rejection was seen by the faithful of Luxembourg as another fruit of the Blessed Virgin Mary's intercession in favour of Luxembourg.

In 1978, for the third centenary of the election as patroness of the country, the Fondation du Tricentenaire was founded. The tradition continues to this day.

In 2020 and 2021, the celebration of the Oktav was limited in numbers due to the ongoing Coronavirus pandemic, but in 2022, the Oktav was celebrated with renewed pomp and circumstance.

== Ceremonial ==
=== Regional pilgrimage ===
Similar to other Marian shrines festivals such as those celebrated at the Basilica of Our Lady of Guadalupe in Mexico or Mariazell Basilica in Austria, the feast of the Oktav is the occasion of a major pilgrimage during which parishioners from all over the country, as well as from the Eifel region in Germany, the Belgian Province of Luxembourg, and France's Lorraine region, embark on a journey to Luxembourg's capital. The current program of the Octave provides every day 12 different masses for the various parishes, schools or other institutions, a devotional with the octave sermon or the solemn recitation of the rosary.

In total, as of 2017, 82 masses are celebrated for the entire Luxembourg community: deportees and political prisoners of war, the elderly, couples, the sick, for the Equestrian Order of the Holy Sepulcher of Jerusalem, to the Benedictines of Clervaux, the Sacred Military Constantinian Order of Saint-Georges, the members of the Consecrated Life, the Luxembourg Armed Forces, the Grand Ducal Police, the municipal council, the vocations ministry and many more.

=== Procession ===
The end of the octave is marked by a final solemn procession in which a statue of Mary is borne through the streets.

The Grand Ducal Family joins the procession on foot. From the cathedral to the Luxembourg City palace, the procession returns to the cathedral for prayers before another walkabout back to the city centre "palais".

Members of the Grand Ducal Family then greet the public from the balcony after an aubade performed by the city's orchestra.

=== Pontifical High Mass ===
Their Royal Highnesses the Grand Duke and the Grand Duchess attend the pontifical high mass which takes place within the octave of the Octave in the Notre-Dame de Luxembourg Cathedral. During the Pontifical High Mass, the Archbishop leads the renewal of the consecration to Notre-Dame.

=== Election of Mary as patroness ===
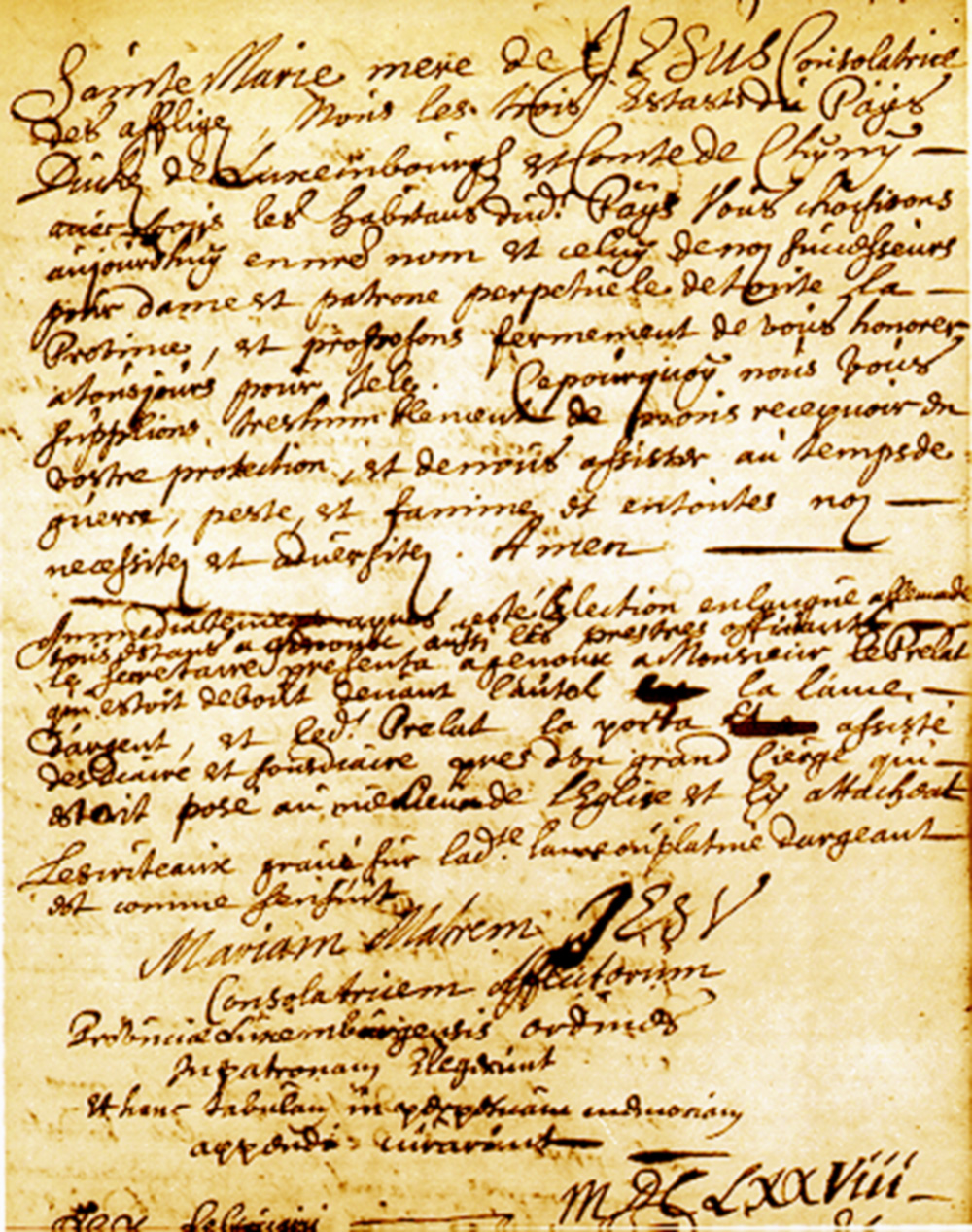
Scan of the Act of 20 February 1678 by which Mary, Consoler of the afflicted, was elected perpetual patroness of the Duchy of Luxembourg.

Every year, Luxembourg renews its faithfulness to Our Lady with the prayer of consecration used since the 17th century. The text of the election act of Mary as patroness of the country on 20 February 1678 is as follows:

Old French	English translation
Sainte Marie mere de JESUS Consolatrice des affliges, nous les trois Estats du Pays Dûche de Luxembourg et Comte de Chiny avec tous les habitans du Pays Vous choisisons aujourdhuy e mes nom et celuy de nos successeurs pour dame et patrone perpetuele de toute la Province, et professions fermement de vous honorer toujours pour tele. Cepourquoy nous vous supplions tres humblement de nous recevoir en vostre protection et de nous assister au temps de guerre, peste et famine et en toutes nos necessites et duersites. Amen	Holy Mary, mother of Jesus, Comforter of the afflicted, we the three Estates of the Country Duchy of Luxembourg and County of Chiny with all the inhabitants of the Country choose You in our names and those of our successors, as lady and patroness perpetual of all the Province, and profess firmly to honour always. That is why we beg you very humbly to take us into your protection and to assist us in time of war, pestilence and famine and in all our needs and varieties. Amen

The text was signed in the Jesuit church by the three estates (clergy, nobility and citizens of the towns), and by the magistrates of the 15 cities and the three "Franchises" of the Duchy of Luxembourg.

== Traditions ==
=== Votive altar ===
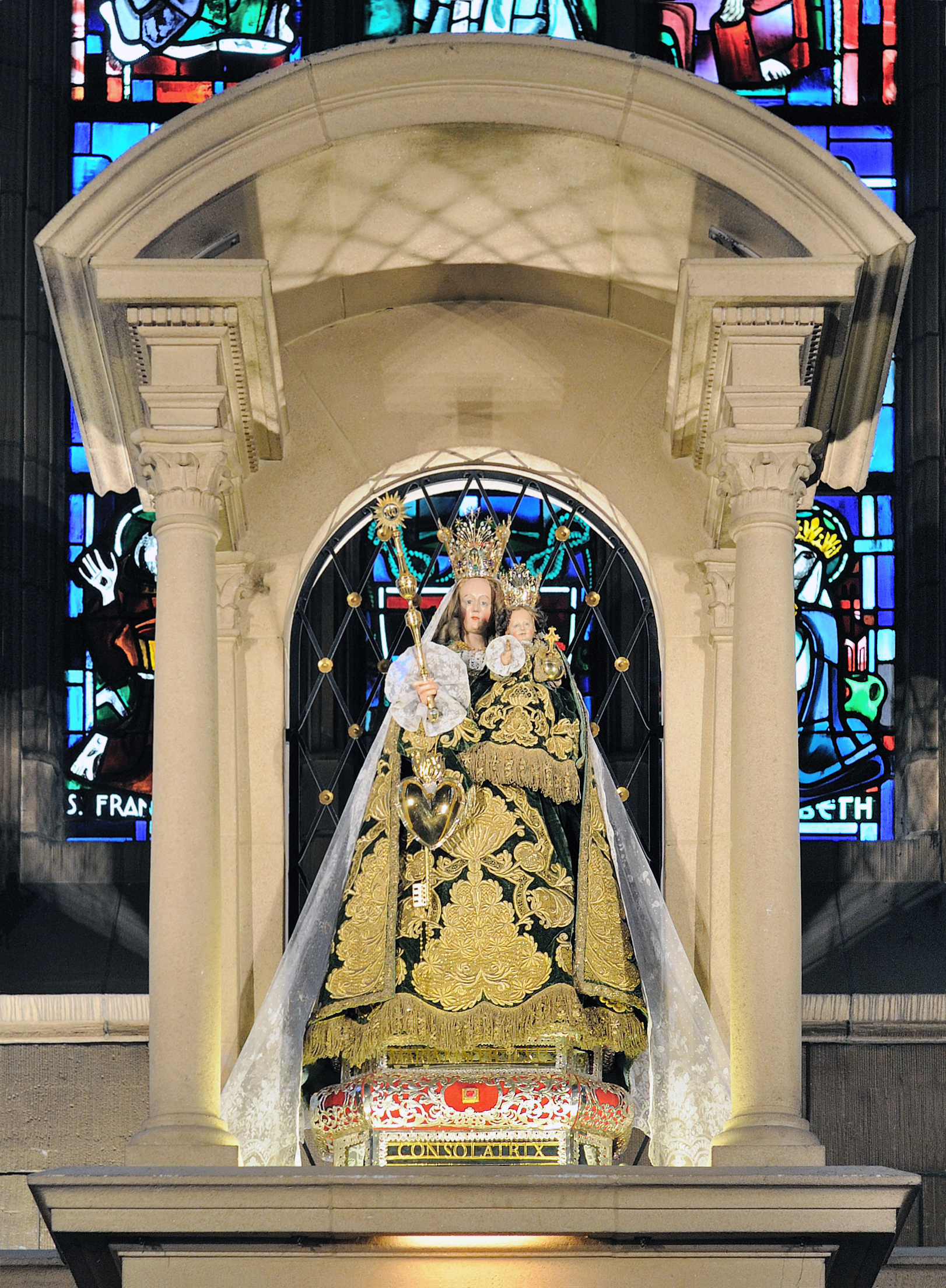
Statue of the Consolatrix Afflictorum in Notre-Dame Cathedral.

The Oktav is the occasion for a solemn veneration of the statue of the Virgin under the iconographic features of the Immaculate Conception, evoking the woman of the Apocalypse with the crescent moon at her feet. Indeed, in 1639 it was the first time that, to cope with the influx of pilgrims, the statue of the Consolator was brought for a period of eight days to the Jesuit church inside the city. At the end of this week, during a solemn closing procession, the statue was brought back to the Glacis chapel. Since 1766, this image has been placed during the Octave on a special rocaille-style votive altar, made of wrought iron and richly decorated. In the eyes of the faithful, this is an inseparable part of the Octave pilgrimage.

=== Mäertchen ===
Mäertchen, or "small markets", were traditionally organised to ensure pilgrims had somewhere to eat during their pilgrimage. Today it is primarily an event where young and old come together to eat, drink and buy various handcrafted items and other memorabilia at the 80 or so stalls on the Knuedler and the Constitution Square.

=== Gromperekichelcher ===
The Gromperekichelcher is a potato pancake which is the traditional snack of the Oktav.

== Bibliography ==
- Michel Schmitt, Georges Hellinghausen, Christentum und Kirche in Luxemburg, Bd. 2 Kirche im Werden und Wachsen eines Volkes, Éditions du Signe, Strasbourg, 1990, ISBN 2-87718-034-4
- Kmec, Sonja (2006). Octave: changements et continuités (in French). Centre national de l'audiovisuel. ISBN 978-2-919873-61-6.
