= Burst (band) =

Swedish metal band

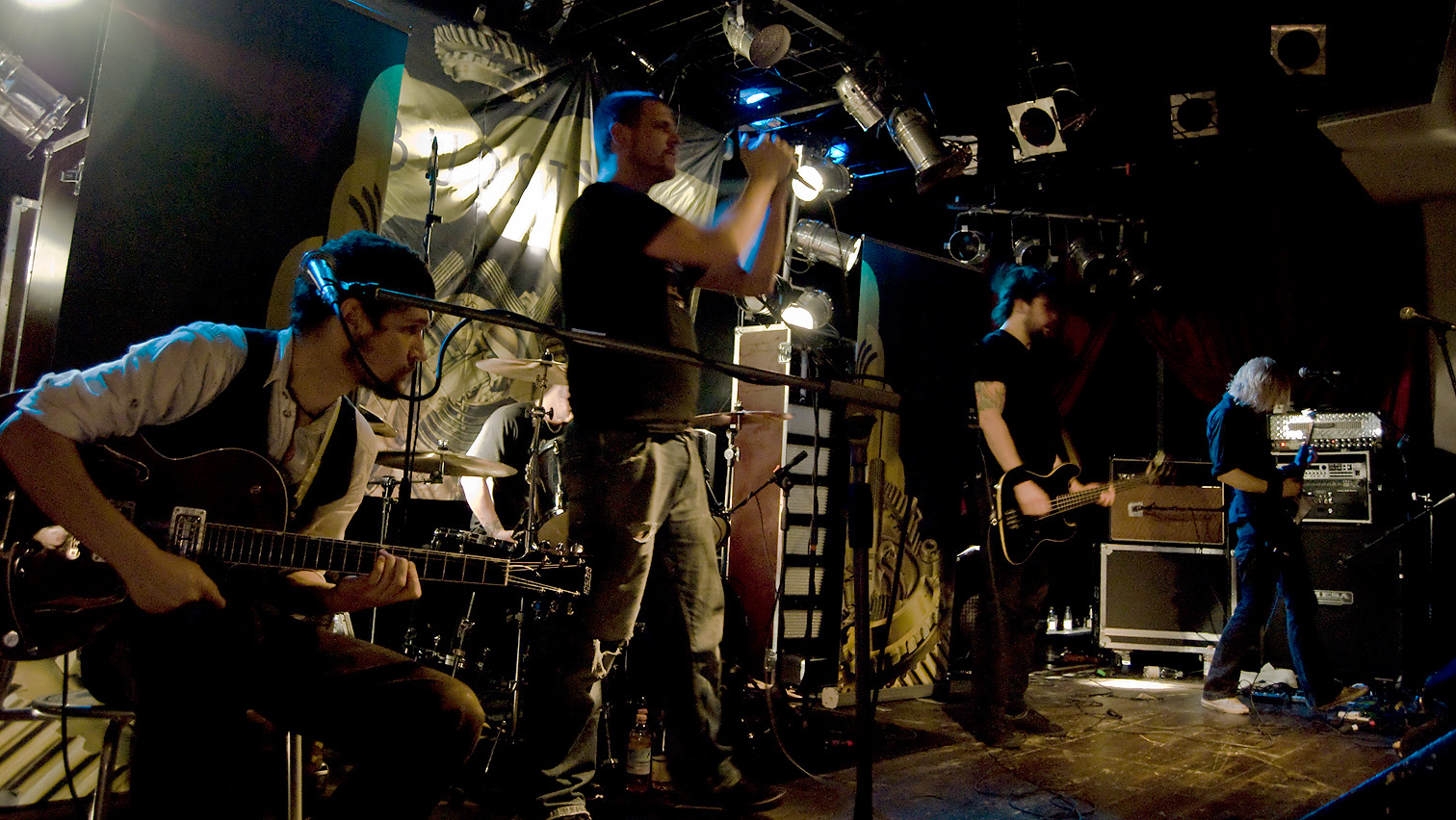
- Burst performing in 2009

Background information
- Origin: Kristinehamn, Sweden
- Genres: Metalcore, post-hardcore, progressive metal, hardcore punk (early)
- Years active: 1993–2009, 2018, 2022–present
- Labels: Relapse, Birdnest, Impression, Prank
- Members: Linus Jägerskog; Robert Reinholdz; Jonas Rydberg; Jesper Liveröd; Patrik Hultin
- Website: www.burst.nu

Burst is a Swedish metal band from Kristinehamn, active between 1993 and 2009. They formed in 1993 by Jesper Liveröd, Linus Jägerskog and Patrik Hultin, with guitarists Robert Reinholdz and Jonas Rydberg joining later. Their label, Relapse Records, labelled them one of Sweden's brightest metal prospects.

== History ==
Formed in 1993, Burst started out playing a brutal style of hardcore punk, but shifted towards a more progressive style while still sticking to their hardcore roots, making them different from most of the other metalcore bands. Their vocals were a mixture of melodic vocals (Reinholdz) and screaming (Jägerskog). After touring heavily in support of their first two albums, in 2003, their third album Prey on Life, was released through the better-known label Relapse Records. It set the band's style and garnered them more popularity. Relapse had bands like Nile and Mastodon in its roster, as well as many well-known bands in the metal community. The release was generally well received. By touring with Dillinger Escape Plan, Mastodon and other bands, Burst began to slowly rise in popularity. Before writing their new album, they knew what direction they had to go. Instead of sticking to a formula that worked, they intended to push themselves even further. The result was Origo, which was praised by magazines such as Terrorizer, Metal Hammer and Kerrang!, and saw the band becoming more popular than ever before.

Burst's last record, Lazarus Bird, was recorded at Bohussound Studio in Kungälv, Sweden, and produced by the band alongside Fredrik Reinedahl, and released by Relapse Records in September 2008. In July 2009, Burst announced they planned to break up as band after a US tour later that year.

The band played a reunion gig at Spain's Be Prog festival in 2018. They reformed in 2022 with three shows in Sweden and Denmark in November, and are planning a tour through the rest of Europe in 2023.

== Last active lineup ==
- Linus Jägerskog – vocals
- Robert Reinholdz – guitar and vocals
- Jonas Rydberg – guitar
- Jesper Liveröd – bass (ex-Nasum)
- Patrik Hultin – drums

=== Past members ===
- Niklas Lundgren – guitar (1993–1997)
- Ronnie Källback – additional vocals (1993–1996)
- Mats Johansson – guitar (1997–1999)

== Discography ==
=== Albums ===
- Two Faced (1998)
- Conquest: Writhe (2001)
- Prey on Life (2003)
- Origo (2005)
- Lazarus Bird (2008)

=== EPs and split albums ===
- Burst (1995)
- Shadowcaster (1996)
- Forsaken, Not Forgotten (split with Lash Out) (1998)
- In Coveting Ways (2002)
- Burnt by the Sun / Burst split (2003)
- Burst / The Ocean split (2005)
