= Lazarus Bird =

Studio album by Burst
- Released: September 16, 2008
- Recorded: May 2008
- Studio: Studio Bohus Sound, Gothenburg, Sweden
- Genre: Progressive metal, post-metal, metalcore, sludge metal
- Length: 59:54
- Label: Relapse Records
- Producer: Burst, Fredrik Reinedahl

Burst chronology
Origo (2005)	Lazarus Bird (2008)

Professional ratings
Review scores
Source	Rating
AllMusic	(positive)
Sputnik Music	4.5/5 stars

Lazarus Bird is the fifth and final full-length album by Swedish progressive metal band Burst, released on September 16, 2008 by Relapse Records. It features lengthier songs than the albums before it, averaging 7.5 minutes per song. It also exhibits a more experimental nature than any of Burst's previous records.

Recording was completed in Studio Bohussound in Kungalv, Sweden, in May 2008. The album's core concept was described by the band as "homogenic" and "thematic".

== Track listing ==
No.	Title	Length
1.	"I Hold Vertigo"	7:16
2.	"I Exterminate the I"	6:58
3.	"We Are Dust"	7:13
4.	"Momentum"	4:34
5.	"Cripple God"	6:42
6.	"Nineteenhundred"	7:55
7.	"(We Watched) The Silver Rain"	9:52
8.	"City Cloaked"	9:23

== Personnel ==
Burst

- Patrik Hultin – drums
- Linus Jägerskog – vocals
- Jesper Liveröd – bass
- Robert Reinholdz – guitar and vocals
- Jonas Rydberg – guitar

Additional personnel

- Ulf Eriksson – saxophone (track 6)
- Jonas Rydberg – engineering
- Robert Reinholdz – engineering
- Dragan Tasmankovic – mastering
- Fredrik Reinedahl – production, engineering
- Oskar Karlsson – additional vocal production
- Emma Svensson – photography
- Orion Landau – design, artwork
