= Nundinae =

Rest days in the ancient Roman calendar

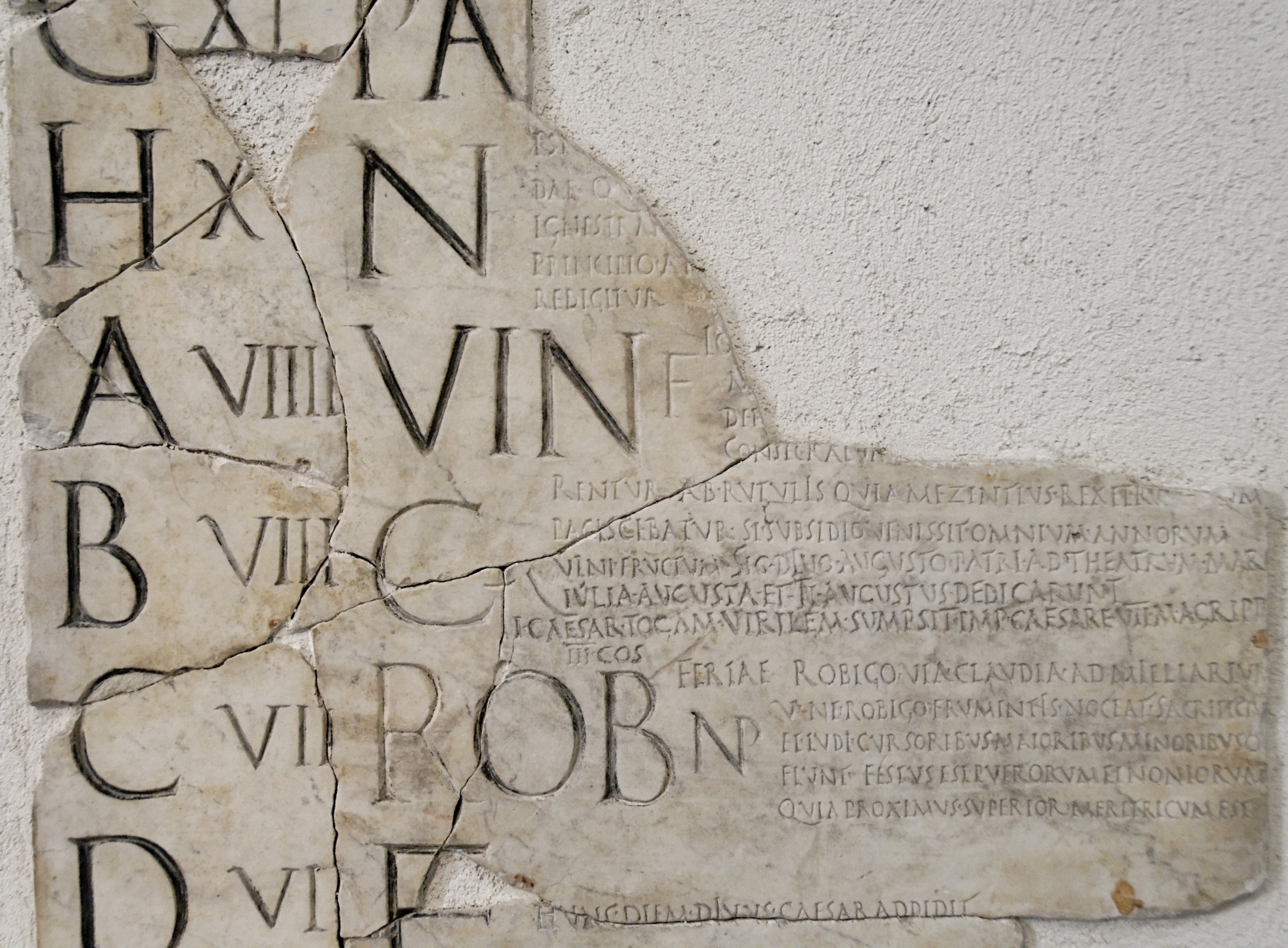
A fragment of the Fasti Praenestini for the month of Aprilis, showing its nundinal letters on the left side

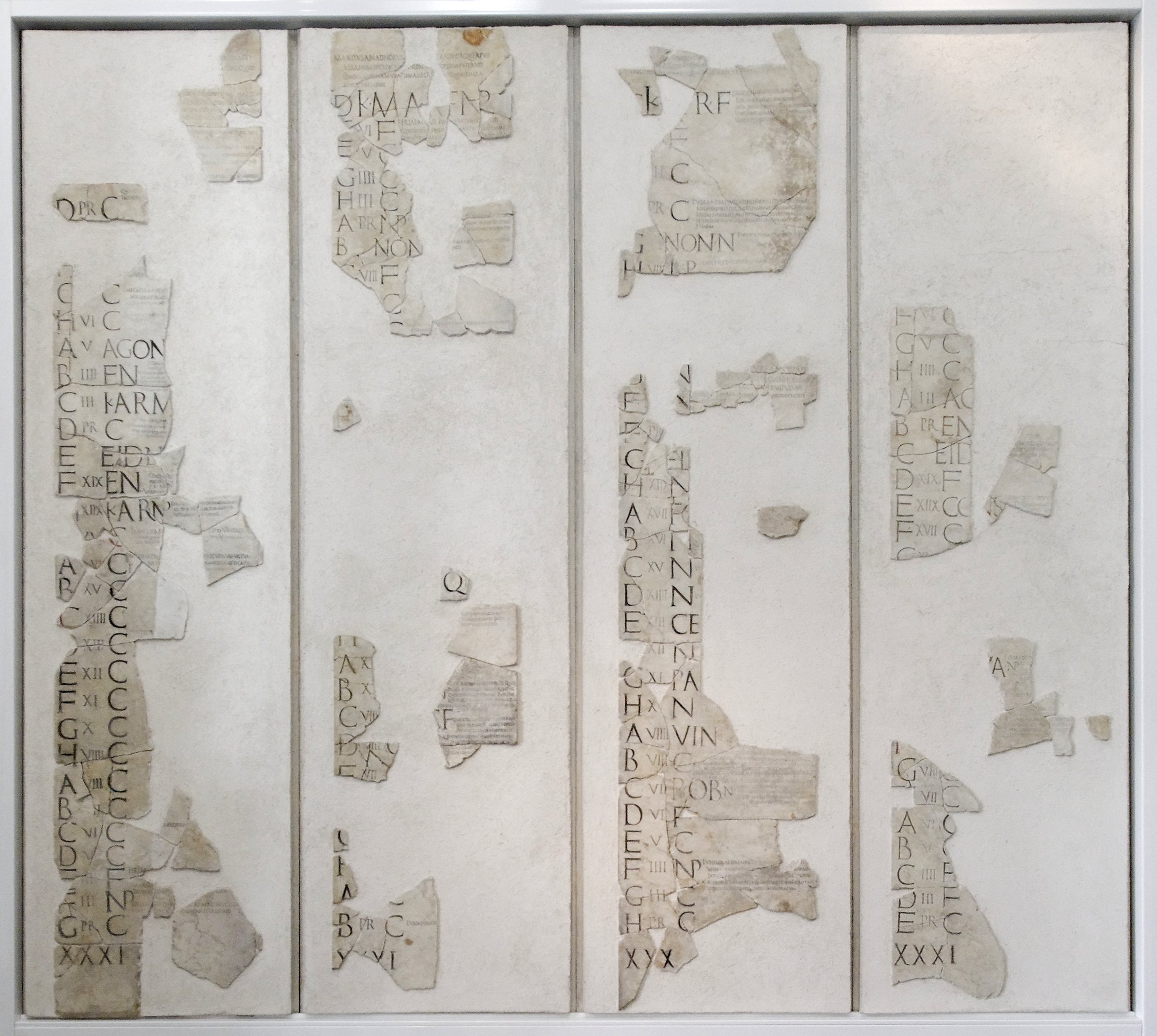
The full remains of the Fasti Praenestini

The nundinae (/nənˈdɪnaɪ/, /-niː/), sometimes anglicized to nundines, were the market days of the ancient Roman calendar, forming a kind of weekend including, for a certain period, rest from work for the ruling class (patricians).

The nundinal cycle, market week, or eight-day week (Latin: nundinum or internundinum) was the cycle of days preceding and including each nundinae. These were marked on fasti using nundinal letters from A to H. The earliest form of the Roman calendar is sometimes said to have included exactly 38 such cycles, running for 304 days from March to December before an unorganized expanse of about 50 winter days. The lengths of the Republican and Julian calendars, however, were not evenly divisible by 8; under these systems, the nundinae fell on a different letter each year. The letters A to G, for the seven days of the week, formed the basis of the later Christian dominical letters.

== Name ==
The name nūndinae (Latin: [ˈnuːn.dɪ.nae̯]) was apparently formed from an early form of nōnus ("ninth") and -din- ("day"), (Note: The equivalent etymology from novem ("nine") and diēs ("day") is given by Festus.) a root related to diēs and ultimately the Proto-Indo-European root reconstructed as *dyew- ("to shine"). It is now glossed as an adjective modifying an understood feriae ("festival; holiday"), (Note: Cornelius Labeo, Fastorum Libri, Book I, cited in Macrobius.) but not all Romans considered it to be one: a writer named Titius listed the nundinae as a "customary occasion" (sollemnes) and the Roman pontiffs themselves told the augur Messala that they did not consider the nones or nundinae to be religious occasions. (Note: Julius Modestus, Quaestiones Confusae, cited in Macrobius.) Like feriae and the names of most other recurring days of the Roman calendar, nundinae always appeared as a plural in classical Latin, even in references to a single day. The English form "nundine", following French nundines, similarly appeared only as a plural at first, although it is now used in the singular number for individual days. In Roman inscriptions, the word was abbreviated nvn.

The form nundinum for the span between the nundinae seems to have been standard in early Latin, but only appears in compounds (internundinum, trinundinum, &c.) and phrases (inter nundinum) in the classical period.

The name of the 8-day cycle is based upon the Latin word for "nine" because the Romans tended to count dates inclusively. Each nundinae was thought to follow the next after a 9-day interval because the first day was included in the count.

== History ==
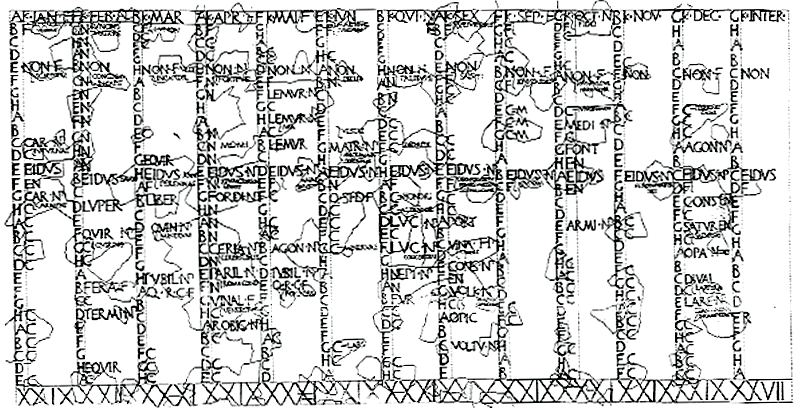
The reconstructed Fasti Antiates, giving the nundinal days to the left of its day list

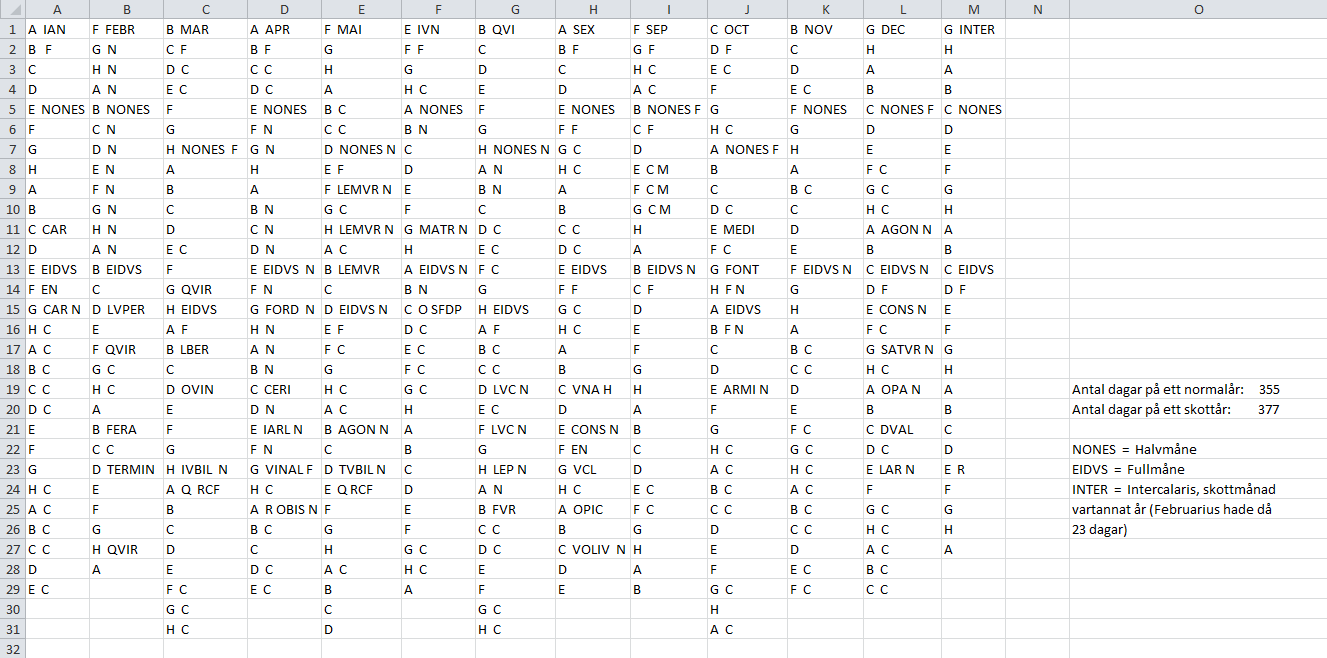
The Roman calendar as given by the Fasti Antiates

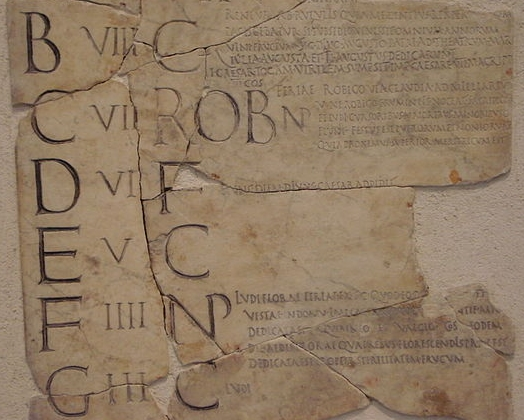
A section of the remains of the Fasti Praenestini

The Etruscans also celebrated an 8-day week which may have been the basis of the Roman system. They supposedly used each day for royal audiences and councils with their various kings. According to Macrobius, the people of the Roman countryside were first obliged to gather in the city on the nones of each month, about a week after the new moon, to hear from the king or his equivalent what the holy days would be and what they were to do over the course of the coming month. The regular nundinae were credited by Roman legend variously to Romulus when he ruled jointly with Titus Tatius and first established Rome's religious observances, (Note: Tuditanus, cited by Macrobius.) to Servius Tullius when he aimed to improve commerce in the town, (Note: Cassius Hemina, cited by Macrobius.) or to the plebeians when they began to gather after the expulsion of Tarquin to offer sacrifices to Servius Tullius. (Note: Geminus and Varro, cited by Macrobius.) Macrobius relates that the prohibition against the nundinae occurring on months' nones arose out of concern that these plebeians visiting the city would cause trouble out of remembrance of the popular Servius Tullius, since it was supposedly generally known that his birthday fell on one of the nones but it was uncertain which.

All patrician business was originally suspended during the nundinae but it seems to have been fasti by the time of the Twelve Tables and, among its provisions, the Hortensian Law (Lex Hortensia) of 287 BC permitted their use for most legal and business purposes. (Note: Granius, Hist., Book II, cited by Macrobius.) Dates otherwise permitted for public assemblies (dies comitialis) were still downgraded if a nundinae occurred on them.

The theoretical proscriptions concerning the nundinae were not always observed. The rebellion of M. Aemilius Lepidus in 78 BC was later remembered as an example of the pernicious effects of having the nundinae occur on the January kalends; the New Year was allowed to coincide with a market again in 52 BC. Cicero complains in one of his letters about a contio being held in the Circus Flaminius despite the nundinae. Following the 46 BC Julian reform of the calendar, the inalterable nature of its leap day intercalation meant that the nundinae began to fall upon the supposedly unlucky days of 1 January and the nones of each month. Early on in the Julian calendar, though, the strength of this superstition caused the priests to insert an extra day as under the former system; it was accommodated by removing another day sometime later in the year; this seems to have occurred in 40 BC and AD 44.

The nundinae of the late Republic and early Empire were possibly centered on the Circus Flaminius. Augustus supposedly avoided new undertakings on the days after nundinae (postridie nundinas), owing either to superstitions concerning homophones of non ("no, not") or analogy with the treatment of the days following kalends, nones, and ides.

The 7-day week first came into use in Italy during the early imperial period. For a time, both systems were used together, but the nundinae are seldom mentioned in extant sources after the Julio-Claudian period. The nundinal cycle had probably fallen out of use by the time Constantine adopted the Hebrew weeks for official use in AD 321, altering the day of rest by declaring the Lord's day the Day of the Sun (dies Solis) a legal holiday. Different scholars have placed the end of 8-day markets at various dates from the late 1st to early 5th centuries.

== Observance ==
The nundinal cycle formed a rhythm within quotidian Roman life. Farmers and craftsmen from Rome's hinterland would rest from work on the nundinae to visit the city, selling groceries and supplies which the Romans or their slaves would purchase for the next eight days. Auctions were held. Children and adolescents were exempted from school. It was a time of public merrymaking and Roman farming and slave manuals included stern warnings about permitting the vilicus, an enslaved overseer, too much free time during the visit to town lest he get caught up in mischief. The church authorities later issued similar admonitions concerning its clerics, priests, and bishops. Nundinae were used for dinner parties and public announcements, especially of coming assemblies and legislation. Later writers praising early Rome's rusticity and spartanness claimed that its farmers would busy themselves with labor during the week and only groom and fully bathe on the nundinae. Pliny describes the superstition, "religiously believed by many", that trimming one's nails silently during the nundinae or doing so beginning with the index finger provoked bad luck for one's finances. The nundinae were not the only markets at Rome, though, as there were both daily markets (macella) and periodic fairs (mercatus).

Under its monarchy, Rome's nundinae were market days for the country plebeians and used as an occasion for the king to settle disputes among them. Supposedly, retail trading was long restricted to foreigners or slaves out of concern for its spiritual effects.

Under the Republic, the gatherings on the nundinae were overseen by the aediles. The days were originally diēs nefāstī upon which no patrician business could be conducted. Plebeians, however, seem to have continued to use them as a time to settle disputes among themselves and to convene their own institutions. This was emended somewhat by the Hortensian Law in the early 3rd century BC, which made plebiscites binding on the whole population. If plebeian assemblies had previously been permitted on market days, any public assemblies—including their informal sessions (contiones)—were now positively banned. (Note: Caesar, Auspices, Book XVI, cited in Macrobius.) At the same time, these provisions meant that the nundinae now could be used for sessions of the Senate. Trebatius noted that officials could free slaves and render judgments on nundinae. (Note: Trebatius, De Religionibus, cited in Macrobius.)

The nundinal cycles were an important pattern in the business of the Centuriate Assembly. All proposed legislation or official appointments were supposed to be publicly announced three weeks (trinundinum) in advance. (Note: Cicero, in his speeches and letters.) The tribunes of the plebs were obliged to conduct and conclude all of their business on the nundinae, such that if any motion was not carried by dusk it needed to be proposed and announced anew and discussed only after a further three-week period. This was occasionally exploited as a kind of filibuster by the patricians and their clients.

Although their religious nature was never very pronounced, the nundinae were allegedly dedicated to Saturn and Jupiter. The flaminica, the wife of Rome's high priest of Jupiter, offered a ram to that god at each nundinae. (Note: Granius, Hist., Book II, cited by Macrobius.) Inscriptions have been discovered from cults to both Jupiter Nundinarius and Mercury Nundinator. Superstitions arose about the ill luck when a nundinae would fall upon January 1st or the nones of any month and the pontiffs who controlled the calendar's intercalation until the Julian reform took steps to avoid such coincidences, usually by making the year 354 instead of 355 days long by removing a day from February or the intercalary month. Since the nones were definitionally eight days before each ides, this also had the unstated effect of avoiding nundinae on them as well. Macrobius's account of the origins of these superstitions is unsatisfying, however, and it is more likely that 1 January was avoided because its status as a general holiday was bad for business and the nones because of the ill luck attending their lack of a tutelary deity.

== Outside Rome ==
The 8-day nundinal cycle also seems to have been observed elsewhere in Italy, particularly Campania, as attested in stone calendars and graffiti, as at Pompeii. There are records from the imperial period of towns and villas petitioning for the right to hold such markets (ius nundinarum). Such a right seems to have been universally granted to the capitals of Italy's prefectures (praefecturae) but also extended to some smaller localities where markets were necessary for local trade. These local fairs used the same calendrical system as Rome's, marking out the days of the year into cycles from A to H, but each town or village in an area typically used a separate day, permitting itinerant traders (circumforanei) to attend each in turn.

A pre-existing system of rural markets in North Africa's Maghreb was also glossed by the Romans as a system of nundinae, although it did not necessarily occur at eight-day intervals. In the 3rd and 4th century, the annual fairs in Mesopotamia were also known as nundinae.

== Legacy ==
The early Roman prejudice against commerce, especially the retail trade of the nundinal markets, means that the nundinae are usually referenced in negative contexts in Latin literature, particularly for the buying and selling of things that should not be sold such as virginity and sex, medical treatment, education, government and church offices and favors, and judicial decisions. This bias endured into medieval Latin, where nundinatio ("marketing") without other qualification meant corruption, especially the purchase of judicial verdicts.

Although nundinae are known to have been manipulated during the late republican and imperial period, moved a day forward or backward to avoid interference with a religious festival or important public assembly, (Note: The details of such interference with the nundinal cycle are unclear but, e.g., it is thought that the nundinae were moved by a day if one occurred on Regifugium, the festival celebrating the flight of the last Roman king. This could occur every three years.) they are thought to have been absolutely fixed at eight days under the republic. Scholars therefore use them when trying to find Julian or Gregorian dates for events in Roman history.

== See also ==
- Roman calendar
- Week & Eight-day week
- Day of the week
- Dominical letters
- Runic calendar

== Bibliography ==
=== Modern sources ===
- Benefiel, Rebecca R. (2016), "Regional Interaction", A Companion to Roman Italy, Malden: John Wiley & Sons, pp. 441–458, ISBN 9781118993118.
- Brind'Amour, P. (1983), Le Calendrier Romain: Recherches Chronologiques (in French), Ottawa, ISBN 2760347028.
- Francese, Christopher (2007), "Nundinae", Ancient Rome in So Many Words, Conshohocken: K & P Publishing, pp. 77, ISBN 978-0-7818-1153-8.
- Göttling, Karl Wilhelm (1840), Geschichte der römischen Staatsverfassung von Erbauung der Stadt bis zu C. Cäsar’s Tod, Halle: Verlag der Buchhandlung des Waisenhauses
- Holleran, Claire (2012), Shopping in Ancient Rome: The Retail Trade in the Late Republic and the Principate, Oxford: Oxford University Press, ISBN 9780199698219.
- Kennedy, Benjamin Hall (1879), The Public School Latin Grammar, London: Longmans, Green, & Co., ISBN 9781177808293
- Ker, James (2010), "Nundinae: The Culture of the Roman Week", Phoenix, Vol. 64, No. 3, Classical Association of Canada, pp. 360–385.
- Michels, Agnes Kirsopp Lake (1967), The Calendar of the Roman Republic, Princeton, ISBN 9781400849789.
- Schmitz, Leonhard (1842), "Nu'ndinae", in Smith, William (ed.), A Dictionary of Greek and Roman Antiquities, London: Taylor & Walton, p. 648.
- Snyder, Walter F. (1936), "Quinto Nundinas Pompeis", The Journal of Roman Studies, Vol. 26, No. 1, pp. 12–18.
- Struck, Peter T. (2009), "Dictionary", Greek & Roman Mythology, Philadelphia: University of Pennsylvania.

=== Ancient sources ===
- Cassius Dio, Ῥωμαϊκὴ Ἱστορία [Rhōmaïkē Historía] (in Latin).
- Cicero, De Domo Sua ad Pontifices Oratio (in Latin).
- Cicero, Epistulae ad Atticum (in Latin).
- Cicero, Epistulae ad Familiares (in Latin).
- Cicero (1908), Shuckburgh, Evelyn Shirley (ed.), Letters, London: George Bell & Sons.
- Cicero, Philippicae (in Latin).
- Cicero (1903), "The Fourteen Orations against Marcus Antonius", in Yonge, C.D. (ed.), The Orations of Marcus Tullius Cicero, London: George Bell & Sons.
- Cicero (1891), "On His House", in Yonge, C.D. (ed.), The Orations of Marcus Tullius Cicero, London: George Bell & Sons.
- Dionysius of Halicarnassus, Ῥωμαϊκὴ Ἀρχαιολογία [Rhōmaïkē Arkhaiología] (in Ancient Greek).
- Dionysius of Halicarnassus (1937), Cary, Ernest (ed.), Roman Antiquities, Loeb Classical Library, Cambridge: Harvard University Press.
- Festus, De Verborum Significatione Libri XX (in Latin).
- Gellius, Attic Nights (in Latin).
- Livy, History of Rome (in Latin)
- Macrobius, Saturnaliorum Libri VII (in Latin).
- Macrobius (2011), Kaster, Robert A. (ed.), Saturnalia, Vol. I, Loeb Classical Library, No. 510 (in English and Latin), Cambridge: Harvard University Press, ISBN 9780674996496.
- Ovid, Fastorum Libri VI (in Latin).
- Ovid (2004), Kline, Anthony S. (ed.), On the Roman Calendar, Poetry in Translation.
- Pliny, Historia Naturalis (in Latin).
- Pliny (1855), Bostock, John (ed.), The Natural History, London: Taylor & Francis.
- Plutarch, "Αἴτια Ῥωμαϊκά [Aítia Rhōmaïká]", Ἠθικά [Ethiká], Book IV, §20 (in Latin).
- Plutarch (1936), "Roman Questions", in Babbitt, Frank Cole (ed.), Moralia, Vol. IV, Loeb Classical Library, Cambridge: Harvard University Press.
- Seneca, Epistulae Morales ad Lucilium (in Latin).
- Suetonius, The Life of Augustus (in Latin).
- Varro, Antiquitates Rerum Humanarum et Divinarum Libri XLI (in Latin).
- Varro, Saturarum Menippearum Libri CL (in Latin).
