= Eight-day week =

"Week" in certain historical calendars that consisted of eight days

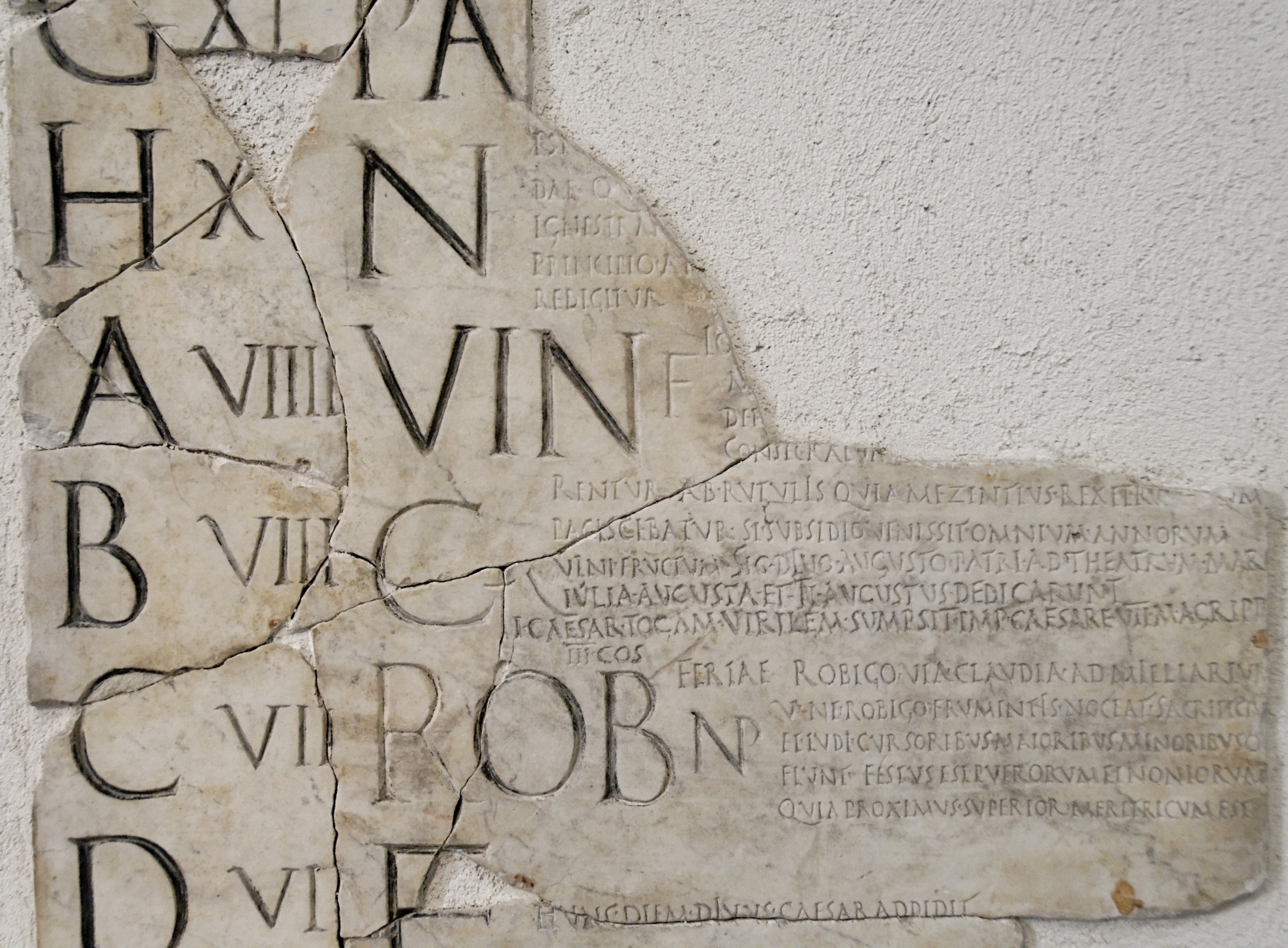
A fragment of the Fasti Praenestini for the month of April (Aprilis), showing the letters of the nundinal cycle (an eight-day market week) on the left edge

Some historical calendars had "weeks" consisting of eight days.

== Burma ==
In the Burmese version of Theravada Buddhism, the week has eight days. Wednesday is divided into Wednesday proper (midnight to noon) and Rahu (noon to midnight). Each day is associated with a compass direction, a planet, and a totem animal.

== Nundinum ==
The ancient Etruscans developed an eight-day market week known as the nundinum around the 8th or 7th century BC. This was passed on to the Romans no later than the 6th century BC. As Rome expanded, it encountered the seven-day week and for a time attempted to include both. The popularity of the seven-day rhythm won, and the eight-day week disappeared.

The cycle of seven days – named for the sun, the moon, and the five planets visible to the naked eye – was already customary in the time of Justin Martyr, who wrote of the Christians meeting on the Day of the Sun (Sunday).

Emperor Constantine eventually established the seven-day week in the Roman calendar in AD 321.

== Celtic calendar ==
The Celts used periods of darkness such as night and winter to begin their calculations of time. This meant that the first period of time in a "week" was a night, followed by a day. Further, they also counted the ending night period, giving rise to periods of time with more nights than days. In Old Irish, the term nómad is used to signify a number of days. The usage of the term varies and there are different theories about the length of time involved, but they all involve nine periods of some kind, e.g. nine days & nights; 9 × 8 hours = 72 hours = 3 days & nights; 9 × 9 hours ~ 3½ days; 9 × 12 hours = 4½ days. Joseph Loth noted the frequency of the expression co cend nomaide (“to the end of a nómad”) in the literature—sometimes replaced by nóilaíthe (“nine days”)—and how the division fitted neatly into a sidereal month of 27 nights. In Welsh, the word for "week" is wythnos which literally means "eight-nights" since it was historically considered that a week started and ended with a period of night bracketing seven days. Similarly the word for "fortnight", pythefnos, literally means "fifteen-nights". The Irish word for "fortnight", coicís, also relates to the number fifteen.
