= Holy day =

Holy day refers to a religious commemorative day or festival:

- Liturgical year, determines when feast days, including celebrations of saints, are to be observed
- List of movable Eastern Christian observances
- List of movable Western Christian observances
- Holy day of obligation, in Catholicism, days on which the faithful are expected to attend Mass
- Festival (Anglicanism), a type of observance in the Churches of the Anglican Communion
- List of Hindu festivals
- Buddhist holidays
- Islamic holidays
- Jewish holidays
- Heathen holidays, in Neopaganism
- Zoroastrian festivals

== See also ==
- Holiday
- List of commemorative days, which also contains a number of religious commemorative days and festivals
- Sabbath
