= Moment (unit) =

Medieval unit of time

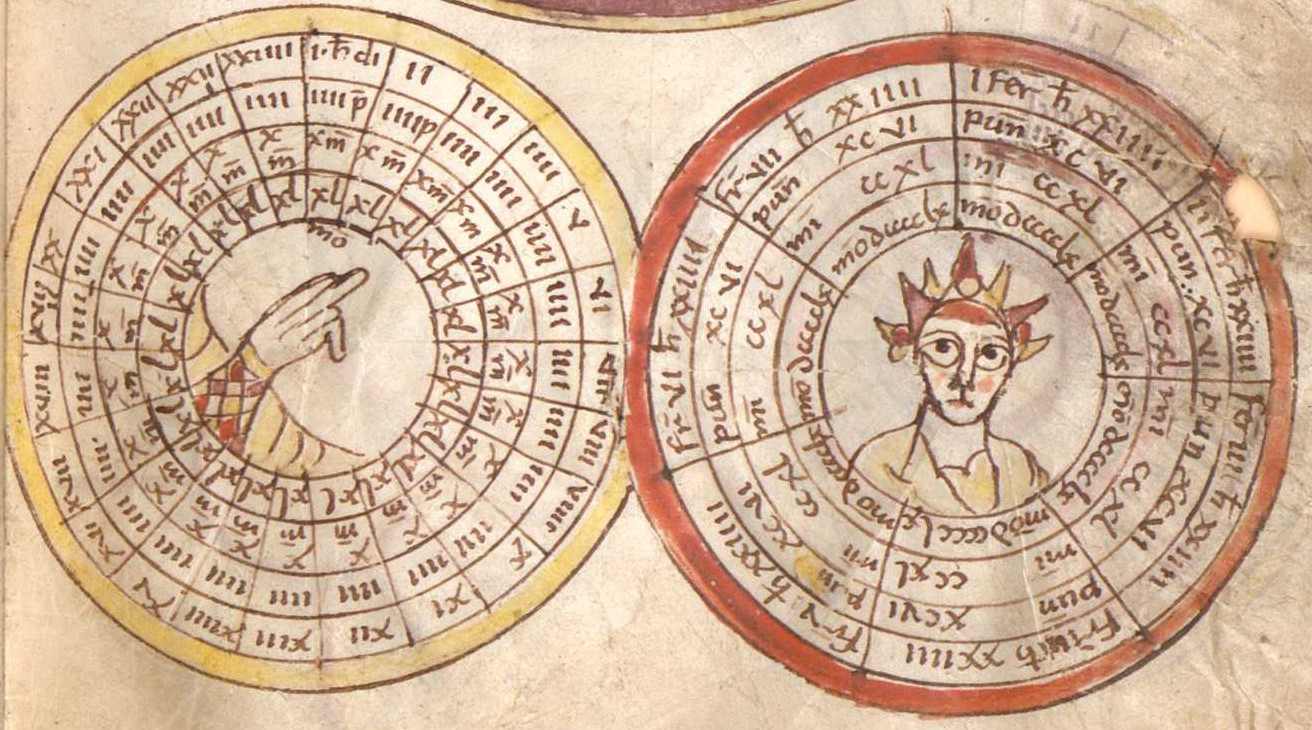
Two circular diagrams showing the division of the day and of the week, from a Carolingian ms. (Clm 14456 fol. 71r) of St. Emmeram Abbey. The day is divided into 24 hours, and each hour into 4 puncta, 10 minuta, or 40 momenta. Similarly, the week is divided into seven days, and each day into 96 puncta, 240 minuta, or 960 momenta.

A moment (momentum) is a medieval unit of time. The movement of a shadow on a sundial covered 40 moments in a solar hour, a twelfth of the period between sunrise and sunset. The length of a solar hour depended on the length of the day, which, in turn, varied with the season. Although the length of a moment in modern seconds was therefore not fixed, on average, a medieval moment corresponded to 90 seconds. A solar day can be divided into 24 hours of either equal or unequal lengths, the former being called natural or equinoctial, and the latter artificial. The hour was divided into four puncta (quarter-hours), 10 minuta, or 40 momenta.

== History ==
The unit was used by medieval computists before the introduction of the mechanical clock and the base 60 system in the late 13th century. The unit would not have been used in everyday life. For medieval commoners, the main markers of the passage of time were the call to prayer at various intervals throughout the day, and the passage of the sun.

The earliest reference found to the moment is from the 8th century writings of the Venerable Bede, who describes the system as 1 solar hour is equal to 4 puncta, or 5 lunar puncta, or 10 minuta, or 15 partes, or 40 momenta. Bede was referenced five centuries later by both Bartholomeus Anglicus in his early encyclopedia De Proprietatibus Rerum (On the Properties of Things), as well as Roger Bacon, by which time the moment was further subdivided into 12 ounces of 47 atoms each, although no such divisions could ever have been used in observation with equipment in use at the time.
