= List of Oberlin College and Conservatory people =

This list of Oberlin College and Conservatory people contains links to Wikipedia articles about notable alumni of and other people connected to Oberlin College, including the Conservatory of Music and the Graduate School of Theology.

== Notable alumni ==
=== Award winners ===
==== Nobel laureates ====
- Joshua Angrist (B.A. Economics 1982), Nobel laureate (Economic Sciences 2021), shared with David Card and Guido W. Imbens "for their methodological contributions to the analysis of causal relationships"
- Stanley Cohen (M.A. zoology, 1945), Nobel (Physiology and Medicine, 1986), for "discoveries of growth factors"
- Robert Millikan (B.A. 1891), Nobel laureate (Physics, 1923) "for his work on the elementary charge of electricity and on the photoelectric effect"
- Roger Wolcott Sperry (B.A. English 1935, M.A. psychology 1937), neurobiologist who studied split-brain research, Nobel laureate (Medicine, 1981), "for his discoveries concerning the functional specialization of the cerebral hemispheres"

==== Pulitzer Prize ====
- Carl Dennis (transferred to University of Chicago, University of Minnesota), Pulitzer Prize-winning poet of Practical Gods; Ruth Lilly Poetry Prize
- Michael Dirda (BA 1970), Pulitzer Prize-winning Washington Post reviewer, author
- Du Yun (BM 2001), composer, winner of the 2017 Pulitzer Prize for Music for opera Angel's Bone
- Emily Nussbaum (BA 1988), winner of the 2016 Pulitzer Prize for Criticism
- Christopher Rouse (BM 1971), winner of the 1993 Pulitzer Prize for Music for Trombone Concerto
- Vijay Seshadri (BA 1974), winner of the 2014 Pulitzer Prize for Poetry for 3 Sections
- George Walker (1941, honorary degree 1983), composer, first African-American to be awarded the Pulitzer Prize for Music (1996, for Lilacs)
- Thornton Wilder (transferred to Yale), playwright and novelist; three Pulitzer Prizes: for the novel The Bridge of San Luis Rey and the plays Our Town and The Skin of Our Teeth; U.S. National Book Award for the novel The Eighth Day
- Franz Wright (BA 1977), recipient of the 2004 Pulitzer Prize for Poetry for Walking to Martha's Vineyard

==== French Legion of Honor ====
- Katharine Wright (1893), Legion d'Honneur business owner, financier; sister of aviation pioneers Wilbur and Orville Wright

==== Academy, Grammy, Tony, Emmy, and Golden Globe awards ====
- Montana Levi Blanco (2006), costume designer, recipient of a Tony Award for The Skin of Our Teeth (2022)
- Mark Boal (1995), screenwriter, recipient of two Academy Awards (Best Picture and Best Original Screenplay for The Hurt Locker, 2009)
- James Burrows (1962), producer and creator of Cheers and Emmy award-winning director of Will & Grace, Wings, News Radio
- Francois S. Clemmons (1976), sang the role of Sportin' Life in Gershwin's Porgy & Bess, recipient of a company Grammy Award Best Opera Recording
- Marc Cohn (1981), singer-songwriter, recipient of a Grammy Award (1991, Best New Artist)
- Lena Dunham (2008), recipient of the 2013 Golden Globe Awards for Best TV Series - Music or Comedy, and Best Actress in a TV Series, the HBO series Girls
- Chris Eldridge (2004), guitarist in Punch Brothers, formerly in the Infamous Stringdusters
- Rhiannon Giddens (2000), member of the Carolina Chocolate Drops; Grammy winner (2010, Grammy Award for Best Traditional Folk Album)
- William Goldman (1952), novelist (The Princess Bride) and recipient of Academy Awards for the screenplays of Butch Cassidy and the Sundance Kid (1969) and All the President's Men (1976)
- Charles Harbutt (1983), classical recording engineer, Grammy recipient (2000 and 2003)
- Bill Irwin (1973), actor and clown, 1984 MacArthur Fellow, recipient of a Tony Award for Who's Afraid of Virginia Woolf? (2005)
- Natasha Katz (1981), lighting designer, recipient of seven Tony Awards for Sweeney Todd: The Demon Barber of Fleet Street (2023), MJ the Musical (2022), Long Day's Journey into Night (2016), The Glass Menagerie (2014), Once (2012), The Coast of Utopia (2007), and Aida (2000)
- Alex Klein (1987), oboist, recipient of a Grammy Award (2002, Best Solo Instrumentalist with Orchestra)
- Michael Maguire (1977, 1987), recipient of Tony Awards for Les Misérables, A Little Night Music (New York City Opera), Kismet (Royal Canadian Opera), Annie Get Your Gun (Miami Opera), currently prominent Beverly Hills divorce attorney; voted Super Lawyer/Rising Star (2011–13)
- John McClure, record producer, received four Grammy Awards for Stravinsky Conducts Columbia Symphony Orchestra – Le Sacre Du Printemps (1962), Leonard Bernstein, New York Philharmonic – Symphony No. 3 Kaddish (1965), Mahler, Symphony of a Thousand (1968), and Bernstein's West Side Story with Te Kanawa, Carreras, Troyanos, Ollmann, Horne (1986)
- Gregory Mosher (1971), director, recipient of Tony Award for revivals of Anything Goes (1984) and Our Town (1989)
- Christopher Rouse (BM 1971), Grammy Award for Best Classical Contemporary Composition for Concert de Gaudí (2002)
- Jeannette Sorrell (1990), founder and artistic director of the Apollo's Fire Baroque Orchestra; Grammy winner Songs of Orpheus (2018)
- Toyin Spellman-Diaz, Imani Winds, Best Classical Compendium, Passion For Bach And Coltrane, 66th Anual Grammy Awards
- Julie Taymor (1974), director, filmmaker, screenwriter, recipient of Emmy and Tony awards (Frida, Titus, Broadway's The Lion King, Across the Universe)

==== MacArthur Fellows ====
The following alumni are fellows of the MacArthur Fellows Program from the John D. and Catherine T. MacArthur Foundation. As this is an interdisciplinary award, they are listed here in addition to their listing in their field of accomplishment.

- Jad Abumrad (1995), radio producer, known for the NPR-distributed Radiolab
- Alison Bechdel (1981), pioneering LGBT cartoonist, author of Dykes to Watch Out For and Fun Home
- Courtney Bryan (2004)
- Claire Chase (2001), flautist and arts entrepreneur
- Jeremy Denk (1990), pianist and writer
- Rhiannon Giddens (2000), musician, MacArthur Fellowship awarded 2017
- Ralf Hotchkiss (1969), engineer and businessman
- Bill Irwin (1973), actor
- Kiese Laymon (1998), writer
- Richard Lenski (1977), biologist
- Diane E. Meier (1973), doctor, MacArthur Fellowship awarded 2008
- Thylias Moss (1981), poet and playwright
- Julie Taymor (1974), director, MacArthur Fellowship awarded 1991
- Paul Wennberg (1985), chemist

==== Rome Prize ====
- Courtney Bryan (2004)
- Ashley Fure (2005)
- Stephen Hartke (1992)

=== Academia ===
- Louisa Lydia Alexander (1856), schoolteacher
- Joshua Angrist (1982), labour market economist
- Lauren Berlant (1979), feminist, queer cultural studies scholar
- Helen E. Blackwell (1994), organic chemist and chemical biologist, professor of Chemistry at the University of Wisconsin–Madison
- Richard D. Brown (1961), historian of colonial and revolutionary America, now emeritus professor at the University of Connecticut
- Christopher Browning (1968), historian of the Holocaust
- Miriam Eliza Carey (1858–1937), librarian who helped put the first libraries in American institutions
- Samuel Charache (1951), hematologist, discoverer of the first effective treatment for sickle cell disease
- Mabel Augusta Chase (1888), physicist and professor
- François Clemmons (1997–2013), Alexander Twilight Artist in Residence, now emeritus professor at Middlebury College
- Johnnetta B. Cole (1957), first female African-American president of Spelman College, president of Bennett College 2002–07
- John R. Commons (1888), institutional economist and labor historian
- Carol Blanche Cotton (1904), African-American psychologist who worked on spastic paralysis in children
- Ethel McGhee Davis (1923), educator, social worker, and college administrator
- Shawn L. Decker, sound artist and academic
- Walter B. Denny (1964), art historian
- Jon Michael Dunn, philosopher (logician)
- John Millott Ellis (1851), acting president of Oberlin College and abolitionist
- George Fairchild (1862), third president of Kansas State University
- Peter Tyrrell Flawn (1947), geologist and former president of the University of Texas at Austin
- Jeffrey I. Gordon (1969), biologist and professor
- Daniel McBride Graham (1843), inventor, Free Will Baptist pastor, first president of Hillsdale College
- Joseph L. Graves, Jr. (1977), associate dean for Research and Professor of Biological Studies
- Matthew D. Green (1999), associate professor of Computer Science at the Johns Hopkins University
- James Monroe Gregory (transferred to Howard University), dean of Collegiate Department at Howard University
- Erwin Griswold (1925), lawyer, solicitor general of the United States and dean of Harvard Law School
- Dennis Hale, 1966, professor of Political Science, Boston College
- Walter Heller, 1935, economist and educator
- Elaine Hill, 2005, health and environmental economist, professor at the University of Rochester
- Robert Hutchins, educational philosopher, president (1929–1945) and chancellor (1945–1951) of the University of Chicago
- Lawrence R. Jacobs, political scientist and founder and director of the Center for the Study of Politics and Governance at the University of Minnesota
- Dale Jacquette, 1975, analytic philosopher
- Charlene Drew Jarvis, 1962, president of Southeastern University
- Robert Jervis (1962), International Relations professor
- Barbara Johnson (1969), literary critic, professor
- Amy Kelly, educator, historian, best-selling author
- Anne Osborn Krueger (1953), economist, World Bank chief economist (1982–1986)
- Edward O. Laumann (1960), George Herbert Mead Distinguished Service Professor of Sociology and the college; editor of the American Journal of Sociology (1978–1984, 1995–1997); chair of the Department of Sociology at the University of Chicago; dean of the Division of Social Sciences at the University of Chicago; provost of the University of Chicago; director of the Ogburn Stouffer Center for Population and Social Organization at the University of Chicago
- Susie Linfield, critic, editor, journalist, author and NYU professor
- Sarah Cowles Little (1838–1912), educator
- Maud Mandel (1989), historian, dean of the College of Brown University; 18th president, Williams College
- Alec Marantz, linguist/morphologist
- Linda McClain (1980), law professor, Boston University School of Law
- John Jay McKelvey, Sr. (1884), attorney, founder of Harvard Law Review
- Alan Wilfrid Cranbrook Menzies FRSE (1877–1966), Scottish-born professor, chemist who taught at Princeton University
- Steven Mintz (1973), professor of History, University of Texas at Austin
- Peter Molnar (1965), professor of Geophysics, University of Colorado Boulder
- Roger Montgomery (1949), dean of Architecture, City Planning, and Landscape Architecture, University of California, Berkeley
- Edward F. Mooney (1962), professor of Religion, Syracuse University
- Anne Eugenia Felicia Morgan (1845–1909), professor, philosopher, writer, and game inventor
- David Novak (1977), professor of Ethnomusicology, University of California, Santa Barbara
- Tom Novak (1977), Denit Trust Distinguished Scholar and Professor of Marketing, The George Washington University
- L. L. Nunn, founder of Telluride Association and Deep Springs College
- Dost Öngür, professor of psychiatry at Harvard Medical School
- Daniel Orr (1954), professor, writer and chair of economics at University of Illinois at Urbana–Champaign
- Mary Jane Patterson (1862), educator and first African-American woman to receive a B.A (A.B.) degree
- Hugh V. Perkins (1941), author and former professor of education, Institute for Child Study, Department of Human Development, University of Maryland, College Park
- Laurence Perrine, author and professor
- Paul Pierson (1981), professor of political science
- Willard V. O. Quine (1930), philosopher and logician
- Albert Rees, former University of Chicago and Princeton economics professor, former Provost at Princeton, advisor to President Gerald Ford
- Charles A. Reich (1949), legal and social scholar
- Thomas L. Riis (1950), musicologist, specialist in American music
- William Sanders Scarborough (1875), classical scholar
- John E. Schwarz (1961), political scientist and author
- Robert E. Scott (1965), law professor
- Donald S. Strong (1912–1995), political scientist
- Meredeth Turshen, political science professor
- Kenneth Waltz (1948), political science professor
- Barbara Wertheimer (1946), historian and labor organizer
- Edwina Whitney (1894), librarian and educator
- C. Martin Wilbur (1931), historian, Sinologist
- Garnet C. Wilkinson (1902), educator and administrator
- Robert Shaw Wilkinson (1891), second president of South Carolina State University
- Warren Hugh Wilson, namesake of Warren Wilson College in North Carolina
- Sheldon S. Wolin (1944), political theorist

=== Business ===
- Joani Blank (1959), founder of Good Vibrations
- Marc Canter (1980), co-founder of MacroMind (predecessor company of Macromedia)
- Jerry Greenfield (1973), co-founder of Ben & Jerry's ice cream
- John Gutfreund (1951), executive, former CEO of Salomon Brothers Inc.; Business Week named him "King of Wall Street" in the 1980s
- Charles Martin Hall (1885), co-discoverer of the electrolytic process for producing aluminium
- Ralf Hotchkiss (1969), co-founder of Whirlwind Wheelchair International; 1989 MacArthur Foundation Fellow
- Levancia Holcomb Plumb (1861, BA; 1865, MA), president and chief stockholder of the Union National Bank of Streator, Illinois
- Kamal Quadir (1996), founder and CEO of bKash, which provides financial services to over 40 million customers
- David Shapira (1963), executive chairman, Giant Eagle
- Nova Spivack (1991), entrepreneur

=== Politics, government ===
==== Vice presidents ====
- Hsiao Bi-khim (1993), incumbent vice president of Taiwan; former Taiwan representative to the United States; former member of the Legislative Yuan (Parliament) of Taiwan, representing the Democratic Progressive Party

==== Premiers ====
- H. H. Kung (1906), banker and premier of the Republic of China (1938–39)

==== Legislators ====
- Blanche Bruce, second African-American senator from Mississippi, serving 1874–1881
- Yvette Clarke (transferred from Medgar Evers College), Democratic representative for New York's 11th congressional district, 2007–present
- Jacob Dolson Cox, politician and author, governor of Ohio (1866–1888), US secretary of the Interior (1869–1870)
- Paul Drennan Cravath (1882), lawyer, partner of Cravath, Swaine & Moore; creator of the "Cravath System"; founding vice president of the Council on Foreign Relations
- Richard A. Dawson, lawyer and state legislator in Arkansas
- Heather Deal (BA, 1983), city councillor 2005–present, Vancouver City Council
- John Langalibalele Dube, first (founding) president of the African National Congress
- Ruth Hardy (BA, 1992), member, Vermont Senate
- Myron T. Herrick, 42nd governor of Ohio
- Richard Hodges (1986), member of the Ohio House of Representatives, 1993–1999
- Alfred A. Laun Jr., Wisconsin state senator
- Jen Metzger (1987), county executive for Ulster County, former New York state senator
- Eduardo Mondlane (1953), Mozambican political leader
- Edward Schwartz (BA, 1965), at-large city councilman 1984–87, Philadelphia City Council; first councilman with a Pd.D (doctorate in political theory, Rutgers University); first Philadelphia councilman to computerize his constituent services
- Delazon Smith, senator from Oregon; was expelled from Oberlin
- Harrison A. Williams (1941), U.S. senator and congressman from New Jersey

==== Mayors ====
- Stephanie Rawlings Blake (1992), former mayor of Baltimore
- Adrian Fenty (1992), former mayor of Washington, D.C.

==== Executive council ====
- Bruce Cole (1964), chairman of the National Endowment for the Humanities under George W. Bush
- Erwin Griswold (1925), solicitor general under presidents Johnson and Nixon
- Richard N. Haass (1973), president of the Council on Foreign Relations and former Director of Policy Planning for the U.S. Department of State
- Cynthia Hogan (1979), counsel to the vice president of the United States, Joe Biden, under President Obama
- Martha N. Johnson (1974), former official in the Clinton administration; administrator of the United States General Services Administration
- Anne O. Krueger (1953), economist; deputy director of the International Monetary Fund; Oberlin trustee (1987–95)
- Robert Kuttner (1965), co-founder and co-editor of The American Prospect; one of five co-founders of the Economic Policy Institute
- Charles Sawyer (1908), secretary of Commerce to Harry S. Truman

==== Diplomats ====
- John Mercer Langston (1849), U.S. congressman representing Virginia's 4th Congressional District; US minister to Haiti under President Rutherford B. Hayes
- Edwin O. Reischauer (1931), U.S. ambassador to Japan (1961–1966)
- Marcie Berman Ries (1972), U.S. ambassador to Bulgaria (2012–present)
- Carl Rowan (1947), U.S. ambassador to Finland (1963); deputy assistant secretary of state under President Kennedy; director of U.S. Information Agency under President Johnson
- John S. Service (1931), foreign service officer, China Hand
- Durham Stevens (1871), assassinated diplomat to Japan
- Tsiang Tingfu (1918), ambassador from Republic of China to Russia (1936–1938), United Nations (1947–1962), and USA (1962–1965)

==== Other ====
- Tom Balmer (1974), chief justice of the Oregon Supreme Court
- Alonzo Barnard (1843), Presbyterian missionary and abolitionist with his wife Sarah Philena Babcock Barnard (1843)
- Lee Fisher (1973), former lieutenant governor and former attorney general of Ohio
- Erwin Griswold (1925), lawyer, solicitor general of the United States and dean of Harvard Law School
- Kan En Vong (1922), Chinese educator
- Ruth A. Parmelee (1907), Christian missionary
- Todd Portune (1980), former member of Cincinnati City Council (1993–2000); Hamilton County Commissioner (2001–2019)
- Albert Rees (1943), advisor to President Gerald Ford, former University of Chicago and Princeton economics professor, former provost at Princeton
- Moses Fleetwood Walker, first African-American Major League Baseball player
- Sylvia Williams (1957), former museum director for National Museum of African Art at Smithsonian Institution; pioneer in African art history

==== Activists ====
- Nan Aron (1970), founder and president of Alliance for Justice
- Josephine Penfield Cushman Bateham (1829–1901), social reformer, editor, writer
- Kathleen Neal Cleaver (transferred to Barnard College), senior research associate at Yale Law School known for her involvement in the Black Panther Party
- Henry Roe Cloud, Native American political leader
- Rennie Davis, anti-Vietnam War activist and one of the Chicago Seven
- Ernie Dickerman (1931), wilderness preservationist, focused in the eastern United States, The Wilderness Society staff 1956–1976, Virginia Wilderness Committee president 1976–1979, "grandfather of Eastern Wilderness"
- Matilda Evans (1891), first African-American woman to practice medicine in South Carolina; community health advocate
- Ida Gibbs (1884), educator, civil rights and women's suffrage advocate
- John Mercer Langston (1849), early civil rights activist
- James Lawson (Graduate School of Theology, 1950s), theoretician and tactician of nonviolence in US civil rights movement
- Caroline F. Putnam (1848), abolitionist and educator
- Jerry Rubin, anti-Vietnam war activist and one of the Chicago Seven
- William F. Schulz (1971), former executive director of Amnesty International USA
- Barbara Seaman (1956), principal member of the women's health feminism movement
- Toyin Spellman-Diaz, Imani Winds, diversifying the classical music space
- Peter Staley (1983), AIDS activist, founding director of the Treatment Action Group
- Lucy Stone (1847), feminist and abolitionist
- Anna Louise Strong (1905), activist and author
- Mary Church Terrell (1884/1888), author, activist
- John Todd (1841), abolitionist, conspirator with John Brown, founder of Tabor College
- Wayne Bidwell Wheeler (1894), attorney, prohibitionist
- Mary Evans Wilson (ca. 1897), civil rights activist

=== Journalism ===
==== Broadcast media ====
- Jad Abumrad, radio journalist, host and producer of Radiolab
- Michael Barone (1968), host, Pipedreams
- Alex Blumberg (1989), producer, This American Life
- Chris Broussard (1990), Fox Sports sports analyst
- Ben Calhoun (2001), radio journalist, producer for This American Life
- Jon Hamilton (1983), NPR science correspondent
- Aleks Krotoski, television and radio presenter ("Digital Human" on BBC Radio 4)
- Robert Krulwich (1969), television and radio journalist (RadioLab on WNYC)
- Roman Mars, radio producer and host, 99% Invisible on 91.7 KALW in San Francisco
- Seth Rudetsky (1988), radio host, Broadway actor, pianist, writer
- Alix Spiegel (1994), co-host of NPR's Invisibilia; producer for This American Life

==== Print and online ====
- Peter Baker (1988), New York Times senior White House correspondent and author
- John K. Byrne (2003), founder of news website Raw Story
- Wendell Dabney, influential civil rights activist
- Michael Duffy (1980), writer, Washington Bureau Chief and editor of Time magazine
- Kim France (1987), founding editor of Lucky magazine
- Lisa Jervis (1993), creator and editor of Bitch magazine
- Fred Kaplan (1976), journalist and Slate columnist
- James Kim (1992), senior CNET editor and technology analyst
- Michelle Malkin (1992), writer (Los Angeles Daily News, The Seattle Times), author (In Defense of Internment), political commentator
- James McBride (1979), journalist (Boston Globe, The Washington Post), author (The Color of Water), musician
- Willis E. Mollison (1883), newspaper publisher and editor in Vicksburg, Mississippi
- Adam Moss (1979), editor of New York magazine
- Emily Nussbaum (1988), television critic for The New Yorker magazine
- Jane Pratt (1984), creator of Sassy and Jane magazines
- Tim Riley (1983), NPR critic; author (Tell Me Why, Lennon: Man, Myth, Music); Emerson College journalism professor (aka Tim Mikesell)
- Carl T. Rowan (1947), journalist
- David Schlesinger (1982), editor-in-chief, Reuters news, Thomson Reuters
- Sonia Shah (1990), investigative journalist
- Steve Silberman (1982), science writer for Wired
- Sophia Yan (2009), reporter for Bloomberg News

=== Literature ===
- Rumaan Alam, author of Leave The World Behind
- Paolo Bacigalupi, author of The Windup Girl
- Ishmael Beah (2004), author of A Long Way Gone: Memoirs of a Boy Soldier
- Alison Bechdel (1981), cartoonist (Dykes To Watch Out For) and graphic novelist (Fun Home)
- Bill Beverly (1987), novelist, author of Dodgers
- Geoffrey Blodgett (1953), historian and author of Cass Gilbert: The Early Years
- Wendy Brenner (1987), author of Phone Calls From the Dead
- Alice Rowe Burks (1942), author of Who Invented the Computer?: The Legal Battle that Changed Computing History
- Michael Byers (1991), novelist and author of The Coast of Good Intentions, Long for This World, and Percival's Planet
- Gail Carriger (1998), fantasy novelist of Soulless
- Tracy Chevalier (1984), novelist and author of Girl with a Pearl Earring, Falling Angels, and The Lady and the Unicorn
- Anna J. Cooper (1884), author and teacher, fourth African-American woman to receive a PhD
- Alev Lytle Croutier, Turkish-American author
- Charles D'Ambrosio (1982), essayist, short story writer
- Josh Emmons (1995), novelist (The Loss of Leon Meed, Prescription for a Superior Existence)
- Jim Fixx (1957), columnist and editor (Saturday Review, McCalls, Life), author (The Complete Book of Running)
- Darcy Frey (1983), non-fiction writer
- Alan Furst (1962), novelist, author of Blood of Victory
- Rosetta Luce Gilchrist (1870), physician, writer
- Myla Goldberg (1993), novelist (Bee Season, Wickett's Remedy)
- Harriett Ellen Grannis Arey (1819-1901), educator, author, editor, and publisher
- Melissa Fay Greene (1975), author (There Is No Me Without You)
- Linda Gregerson (1971), poet (Waterborne, Magnetic North)
- David Halperin (1973), author (One Hundred Years of Homosexuality)
- Bill Henderson (1965), author of Stark Raving Elvis, I Killed Hemingway, I, Elvis: Confessions of a Counterfeit King
- Joe Hickerson (1957), folklorist
- Donovan Hohn (1972), author of Moby-Duck
- Jonathan Holden (1963), poet (Knowing: New and Selected Poems)
- Michael Hollinger (1984), playwright (Red Herring)
- Cathy Park Hong (1998), poet and writer (Engine Empire, Dance Dance Revolution, Minor Feelings)
- Tim Hurson (1967), speaker, writer, creativity theorist, author of Think Better: An Innovator's Guide to Productive Thinking
- Sophie Kemp, novelist (Paradise Logic)
- Myung Mi Kim (1979), poet
- Kiese Laymon (1997), professor and author of Long Division, How to Slowly Kill Yourself and Others in America, and Heavy, the 2019 Andrew Carnegie Medal for Excellence in Nonfiction
- Jason Little (1993), cartoonist and author of Shutterbug Follies and Motel Art Improvement Service
- David Maine (1985), novelist (The Preservationist)
- Megan McDonald (1981), writer of children's literature (Judy Moody, The Great Pumpkin Switch)
- J. Hillis Miller (1948), literary critic (The Ethics of Reading, On Literature)
- Wayne Miller, poet
- Naeem Mohaiemen (1993), writer and artist whose projects research histories of the 1970s international left
- Martha Moody (1977), author of Best Friends, Office of Desire, and Sometimes Mine
- Thylias Moss (1981), poet, playwright, and 1996 MacArthur Fellow
- Josh Neufeld (1989), cartoonist (A.D.: New Orleans After the Deluge, A Few Perfect Hours, The Influencing Machine)
- Thisbe Nissen (1994), novelist (Out of the Girls' Room and Into the Night, Osprey Island)
- Peggy Orenstein (1983), author (Cinderella Ate My Daughter: Dispatches from the Front Lines of the New Girlie-Girl Culture)
- Rich Orloff (1973), playwright (Big Boys)
- Dzvinia Orlowsky (1975), poet (Except for One Obscene Brush Stroke)
- Jena Osman (1985), poet (The Character)
- Suzanne Paola (1980), memoirist and poet (Lives of the Saints)
- Lia Purpura (1986), poet (Stone Sky Lifting), essayist (Increase, On Looking)
- David Rees (1994), cartoonist (My New Fighting Technique is Unstoppable, Get Your War On)
- S. J. Rozan (1972), novelist (Reflecting the Sky), Edgar Allan Poe Mystery Award Winner, 2003
- John C. Russell (1985), playwright (Stupid Kids)
- Kathy Lou Schultz (1990), poet (Some Vague Wife)
- Elizabeth Searle (1983), novelist (Celebrities in Disgrace)
- Stephen W. Sears (1954), author (Gettysburg)
- Vijay Seshadri (1974), poet (The Long Meadow)
- Matthew Sharpe (1984), novelist (Nothing is Terrible, The Sleeping Father, Jamestown)
- Gary Shteyngart (1995), novelist (The Russian Debutante's Handbook, Absurdistan, Super Sad True Love Story)
- Donald J. Sobol (1948), author of the Encyclopedia Brown series
- Matthew Stadler (1981), novelist (Allan Stein)
- Jon Swan (1950), playwright, poet, librettist, and journalist
- Marcia Talley (1965), novelist, Agatha and Anthony Award winner, 2002, 2003, 2005
- Michael Teig (1990), poet (Big Back Yard)
- Joseph Jeffrey Walters (1893), author of Guanya Pau, the earliest surviving novel written in English by an African
- Geoffrey Ward (1962), author (The West: An Illustrated History and The War: An Intimate History, 1941-1945)
- Bruce Weigl (1973), poet (Archeology of the Circle: New and Selected Poems)
- William Drake Westervelt (1871 and 1874; honorary degree 1926), Hawaiian historical writer
- Christopher Robin "Kit" Woolsey (1964), writer (Matchpoints), bridge internationalist and backgammon expert
- John Wray (1993), novelist (The Right Hand of Sleep, Lowboy)
- Franz Wright (1977), poet, Pulitzer Prize winner (Walking to Martha's Vineyard)

=== Religion ===
- William Ament, controversial missionary to China
- Juanita Breckenridge Bates, Congregationalist minister, her application being the test case to determine the policy of the denomination; first woman to be awarded a Bachelor of Divinity degree from Oberlin (1891)
- Hobart Baumann Amstutz, bishop in The Methodist Church
- Thanissaro Bhikkhu, abbot of a Buddhist monastery in California
- Antoinette Brown (1847), first ordained female minister in the U.S.
- John M. Brown, bishop of the AME Church
- Lewis Sperry Chafer (1891), theologian; one of the prominent proponents of Christian Dispensationalism; founder and first president of Dallas Theological Seminary
- Fanny Jackson Coppin (1865), influential educator and missionary
- Marcus Dale, early African-American preacher in New Orleans
- Susan Topliff Davis (1862-1931), president, Georgia Synodical Auxiliary Presbyterian Church; president, Presbyterian Hospital Association of Georgia
- Vernon Johns (1919), African-American preacher, widely hailed as the father of the civil rights movement
- William Weston Patton, African-American pastor, president of Howard University
- Martha Root (1890s), Hand of the Cause in the Bahá'í Faith
- Lorenzo Snow, fifth president and a prophet of the Church of Jesus Christ of Latter-day Saints
- John Todd, founder of Tabor College
- Henry Benjamin Whipple, Episcopal bishop and advocate for the Native Americans, first bishop of the Diocese of Minnesota

=== Science ===
See also: Nobel laureates

- Arthur L. Benton (1931), neuropsychologist
- Mary Ann Bickerdyke, Civil War nurse and hospital administrator, post-war veteran advocate
- Helen E. Blackwell (1994), organic chemist and chemical biologist, explorer of chemical signaling in bacteria
- Thaddeus Cahill (1889), physicist; inventor of the teleharmonium, the first electromechanical musical instrument
- Stuart Card (1966), pioneer in human-computer interaction
- Patricia Charache, microbiologist and infectious disease specialist
- Kenneth Stewart Cole (1922), biophysicist, best known for creating the concept of the voltage clamp
- Thomas Ebbesen (1966), physical chemist, pioneer in the field of nanoscience for which he received the Kavli Prize
- Joan Feynman (1948), solar astrophysicist at JPL in Pasadena, California; sister of Richard Feynman
- Jim Fixx (1957), author of The Complete Book of Running
- Thomas Frieden (1982), director of the U.S. Centers for Disease Control and Prevention
- Robert Galambos (1914–2010), researcher on bat echolocation
- John Gofman (1939), scientist in the Manhattan Project; activist on issues with nuclear power and radiation danger
- Jerry Gollub (1966), physicist
- Elisha Gray, inventor of the telephone beaten to the patent office by Alexander Graham Bell; credited with invention of the electromechanical oscillator
- Mary E. Green, physician
- Matthew D. Green (1999), co-inventor of ZCash, cryptocurrency
- Philip Hanawalt (1954), scientist, co-discoverer of DNA excision repair
- Robert Aimer Harper (1886), botanist, president of the Botanical Society of America
- Edward Haskell (1929), scientist and educator
- Ellen Hayes (1878), astronomer and mathematician
- Donald Henderson (1928–2016), epidemiologist
- Ralph F. Hirschmann (1922–2009), biochemist who led synthesis of the first enzyme
- James E. Humphreys, mathematician and LGBTQ activist
- Ernest Ingersoll, naturalist
- Richard Lenski (1977), biologist and 1996 MacArthur Fellow
- John E. Mack (1951), psychologist, author (A Prince of Our Disorder)
- Rollo May (1930), psychologist, author
- Catherine McBride-Chang (1989), psychologist, researcher in cross-cultural development of early literacy skills
- George Herbert Mead (1883), philosopher, leading figure of American pragmatism
- Ira Mellman (1973), cell biologist, discoverer of endosomes
- Maynard Mayo Metcalf (1889), biologist and zoologist
- John Wesley Powell (1858), geologist and explorer
- Anita Roberts (1964), molecular biologist who made pioneering observations of TGF beta
- Larry Squire (1963), Distinguished Professor of Neuroscience and Psychology at University of California, San Diego
- Lynne Talley (1976), professor of Physical Oceanography, Scripps Institution of Oceanography
- Paul Wennberg (1985), chemist and 2002 MacArthur Fellow
- Felisa Wolfe-Simon, geomicrobiologist at the U.S. Geological Survey; fellow of the NASA Astrobiology Institute
- Lauren V. Wood, allergist, immunologist, and captain in the US Public Health Service

=== Visual and performing arts ===
==== Film and television ====
- Kelly AuCoin (1989), actor (The Americans, Billions)
- Sarah-Violet Bliss (2006), screenwriter and director (Search Party)
- Eric Bogosian (1976), novelist, playwright (Talk Radio, subUrbia), and actor (Law and Order: Criminal Intent)
- Avery Brooks (1970; honorary degree in 1996), actor in Uncle Tom's Cabin, American History X, Spenser: For Hire, best known as Benjamin Sisko in Star Trek: Deep Space Nine
- Peter Buchman (1989), screenwriter for Jurassic Park III and Che
- John Cazale (class of 1954, transferred to Boston University), actor in The Godfather (portrayed Fredo Corleone) and The Deer Hunter
- Will Chase (1992), Tony-nominated theater and television actor, Dopesick, Sharp Objects, Nashville
- Francois S. Clemmons (1968–1992), actor/singer best known as Officer Clemmons on Mister Rogers' Neighborhood
- Lena Dunham (2008), actor, director, writer, best known for Tiny Furniture and the HBO series Girls
- Su Friedrich (1975), experimental filmmaker
- Nancy Giles (1981), actress in China Beach, commentator on CBS News Sunday Morning
- Sean Gill (2006), writer and film editor
- Ed Helms (1996), actor (The Office, The Hangover), comedian, correspondent on The Daily Show
- Edward Everett Horton (1909; left his junior year; honorary degree 1953), actor (The Front Page, Top Hat, Holiday), voice actor (Rocky & Bullwinkle)
- Maggie Keenan-Bolger (2006), actress and writer, wrote From the Inside, Out; co-founder of 4th Meal Productions; The Will Rogers Follies and The Music Man national tours
- Judy Kuhn (1981), singer, Broadway performer, and singing voice of Disney's Pocahontas
- Rex Lee (1990), actor, best known for his role on Entourage
- Daniel London (1995), actor (Minority Report, Old Joy, Patch Adams)
- Clare McNulty (2007), actress (Search Party)
- Chris Morocco (2003), professional chef and YouTube personality
- Lloyd Morrisett (1951), co-founder of Children's Television Workshop
- Jim Newman (1955), founder of Dilexi Gallery and Other Minds New Music Festival, San Francisco
- Daniel Radosh (1991), journalist, blogger, writing staff of The Daily Show
- Oren Rudavsky (1979), filmmaker (Hiding and Seeking, And Baby Makes Two, The Treatment)
- Lynn Shelton, filmmaker
- Ben Sinclair (2006), actor, writer, director, and producer (High Maintenance)
- Corey Stoll (1998), stage and screen actor (Intimate Apparel, Law & Order: LA, Midnight in Paris, House of Cards, Ant-Man)
- Nick Wauters, television writer, creator of the NBC series The Event
- Jane Wickline (2021), comedian and featured cast member on Saturday Night Live
- Alexander Whybrow (2003), professional wrestler under the name Larry Sweeney

==== Stage theater ====
- John Kander (1951), of the musical theater team Kander and Ebb (Cabaret, Chicago)
- Romulus Linney (1953, honorary degree 1994), playwright
- Albert Marre (1944), Tony Award-winning director and producer
- Julie Atlas Muz, burlesque dancer, actress, stage director
- Richard Tatum (1988), stage and voice actor; Associate Artistic Director of the ARK Theatre Company, Los Angeles
- Mitch Weiss (1974), Broadway manager (A Chorus Line, The Grapes of Wrath, Beauty & the Beast; Disney Theatricals, NY Shakespeare Festival)

==== Music ====
- Benjamin Bagby (1974), vocalist, harpist, scholar, and founder of early music ensemble Sequentia
- MaVynee Betsch, piano and voice
- Rafiq Bhatia (2010), guitarist for Son Lux
- Andrea Bradford (1970), soprano and businesswoman
- Chris Brokaw (1986), rock drummer for Codeine; guitarist for Come, Consonant
- Margaret Brouwer (1962), composer
- Alyson Cambridge (born 1980), operatic soprano and classical music, jazz, and popular song singer
- Brian Chase (2000), drummer for the Yeah Yeah Yeahs
- Claire Chase, flautist
- James David Christie, organist and pedagogue
- John Austin Clark (2005), music director and harpsichordist
- Francois S. Clemmons (1980–2000), conductor, arranger, and founder/director of the Harlem Spiritual Ensemble
- Will Marion Cook, African-American Broadway composer, musical director, violinist
- Stanley Cowell, jazz pianist
- Theo Croker, jazz trumpeter, composer, arranger
- David Daniels, conductor and author
- Corey Dargel, composer and electronic musician
- Dorothy DeLay, violinist
- Jeremy Denk, pianist
- R. Nathaniel Dett, conductor, pianist, composer, arranger
- Allie Luse Dick (1859–1933), music teacher
- Du Yun, Pulitzer Prize-winning composer, performance artist
- Eighth Blackbird (all members), contemporary music sextet
- Peter Evans, trumpeter
- James Feddeck, assistant conductor of the Cleveland Orchestra; music director of the Cleveland Orchestra Youth Orchestra
- John Ferguson, organist and composer
- Sullivan Fortner, jazz pianist
- Rhiannon Giddens (2000), founding member of the Carolina Chocolate Drops
- Judith Gordon, pianist
- Denyce Graves, opera singer
- John Gurney, opera singer
- Al Haig, jazz pianist
- Megan Marie Hart (2006), opera singer
- Dick Hensold (1981), folk musician, piper
- Natalie Hinderas, professor, pianist and composer
- Moses Hogan, conductor, composer, and arranger
- Paul Horn (1952), jazz flautist
- Matt Hubbard, Willie Nelson's producer; member of 7 Walkers
- International Contemporary Ensemble, contemporary music ensemble
- Amy Ippoliti, yoga teacher, chant and mantra recordings
- Steven Isserlis (1980), British cellist, director of the International Musicians' Seminar
- John Kander, composer of the musicals Chicago, Cabaret, and Curtains
- John Kennedy, composer and conductor
- Carla Kihlstedt, violinist, singer
- Alex Klein, oboist
- Jennifer Koh (1997), violinist, 1994 International Tchaikovsky Competition winner
- Judy Kuhn, actress, singer
- Scott Lawton, conductor
- Sylvia Olden Lee, vocal coach and accompanist
- Michael Maguire, actor/singer, best known for playing Enjolras in the original Broadway production of Les Misérables
- David Maslanka (1965), composer
- James McBride, saxophonist, composer, author of New York Times best-seller The Color of Water
- John McEntire (1991), drummer (Tortoise)
- John T. "Jack" Melick, Jr., bandleader, pianist, and arranger
- David Miller, tenor, member of the multi-platinum operatic pop quartet Il Divo
- Jason Molina, singer-songwriter and guitarist
- Amy X. Neuburg (1984), classical and pop singer
- Farnell Newton, composer and jazz trumpeter
- Karen O, singer, Yeah Yeah Yeahs
- Milt Okun (1948), arranger, producer and musical director for popular 1960s singers such as Peter Paul and Mary, the Chad Mitchell Trio, and John Denver
- Bob Ostertag, composer, performer, instrument builder, journalist, activist, historian
- Doe Paoro (2006), singer-songwriter
- James Paul, conductor
- Alexander Perls (1998), songwriter, music producer
- Liz Phair (1990), singer/songwriter
- William Porter, organist and pedagogue
- Nancy Priddy, singer-songwriter, back-up singer on Leonard Cohen's debut album
- Derek Lee Ragin, countertenor
- Josh Ritter (1999), singer/songwriter
- Lucy Wainwright Roche (2003), musician, half-sister of Rufus Wainwright
- Thomas Rosenkranz, pianist
- Ned Rothenberg, woodwind multi-instrumentalist, composer
- Christopher Rouse, Pulitzer Prize–winning composer
- Michael Rudman (1960), theater director
- Greg Saunier (1991), drummer for Deerhoof
- Alex Scally, guitarist for indie-pop band Beach House
- Jenny Scheinman, jazz violinist
- Andrew Shapiro (1998), composer
- Arlene Sierra, composer
- Robert Sims (baritone), opera singer, author, producer
- Robert Spano (1983), music director of the Atlanta Symphony Orchestra
- Damin Spritzer, organist and academic
- William Grant Still, composer
- Dick Sudhalter (1960), jazz musician and critic
- Jon Theodore, drummer, The Mars Volta
- Pyeng Threadgill, blues, soul blues and jazz singer; daughter of Henry Threadgill
- Jen Trynin (1986), rock singer/songwriter
- Sherry Zannoth, soprano
- David Zinman, conductor

==== Visual arts ====
- Cory Arcangel (2000), post-conceptual artist
- Aisha Cousins (2000), artist, performance art score writer/creator
- Flora Crockett (1911), painter
- Aria Dean (2015), visual artist
- Kalan Sherrard (2010), street performer, puppeteer, and activist
- Julia Vogl (2007), sculptor, public art

== Notable faculty ==
=== Humanities ===
==== English and American literature ====
- Pamela Alexander
- Dan Chaon
- Martha Collins
- Angie Estes
- bell hooks
- Toni Morrison
- Heinz Politzer
- Eugene B. Redmond

==== French ====
- John Kneller, English-American professor and fifth president of Brooklyn College

==== History ====
- Geoffrey Blodgett
- Jeffrey F. Hamburger, art historian
- James Hepokoski, music historian
- William Andrew Moffett
- Seymour Slive
- Robert Soucy
- Ronald G. Suny
- Laurence Thomas
- Amasa Walker
- Aaron Wildavsky

==== Philosophy ====
- Frank Ebersole
- John Millott Ellis
- Wilson Carey McWilliams
- Mike Michalson
- Michael Stocker
- Ronald Grigor Suny
- Laurence Thomas

==== Religion ====
- Paula Richman

==== Visual art and performance ====
- Roger Copeland, professor of Theater and Dance
- Pipo Nguyen-duy, professor of Studio Art, Photography
- Sylvia Williams, museum director, scholar of African art

=== Social science ===
==== Anthropology ====
- Ana Cara, scholar of Latin America
- Calvin C. Hernton
- Susan Kane, archaeologist and professor of Art History
- Albert Howe Lybyer, scholar of the Middle East
- Gisela Richter, archaeologist
- W. I. Thomas
- John Milton Yinger

==== Economics ====
- Thomas Nixon Carver, professor 1894–1902
- James Monroe (1846), congressman from Ohio, professor 1883–1896

==== Sociology ====
- W. I. Thomas
- John Milton Yinger

=== Natural science ===
==== Mathematics ====
- Robert A. Bosch, author and recreational mathematician known for domino art and TSP art

==== Physics ====
- Mildred Allen
- Thaddeus Cahill, composer, physicist and inventor of the Telharmonium
- Elisha Gray, inventor of the electromechanical oscillator

==== Geology ====
- George Nelson Allen, first geologist to survey Yellowstone National Park
- Bruce Simonson, leading expert on banded iron formations

==== Environmental science ====
- David W. Orr

==== Zoology ====
- Hope Hibbard

=== Music ===
==== Composition ====
- John Luther Adams
- Leslie Adams
- George Nelson Allen
- Daniel Asia
- Conrad Cummings
- Đặng Thái Sơn
- Herbert Elwell
- Stephen Hartke
- Jonathan Kramer
- David Lang, composer and founder of Bang on a Can
- Tom Lopez
- David Maslanka
- Gary Lee Nelson
- Lewis Nielson
- Elizabeth Ogonek
- Curtis Roads
- Anna Rubin
- Margaret Vardell Sandresky
- Igor Stravinsky, visiting composition professor, 1962–1963
- Gwyneth Van Anden Walker
- John Williams, visiting composer, 1999–2000
- Olly Wilson
- Joseph R. Wood

==== Performance ====
- Ryan Anthony, trumpeter with Canadian Brass
- David Boe, organ
- Stephen Clapp, violin
- Dang Thai Son, piano
- James DeSano, trombone
- Robin Eubanks, trombone
- Diana Gannett
- Stanislav Ioudenitch, piano
- Raymond Premru, trombone
- Hugh Ragin, trumpet
- Peter Slowik, viola
- John Solum
- Robert Spano
- Alexa Still, flute
- Roland and Almita Vamos, viola

==== Music theory ====
- Jeffrey Mumford
- Andrew Pau, 6-time Jeopardy! champion
- Willard Warch

==== Voice ====
- Salvatore Champagne
- Marilyn Horne
- Richard Miller

=== Theology ===
- James Fairchild
- Charles Grandison Finney
- Asa Mahan

== Administration ==
- William Dawes, trustee and fundraiser
- Mildred H. McAfee, dean of Women
- Elizabeth Watson Russell Lord, assistant principal, Women's Department (1884–94); assistant dean, Women's Department (1894–1900)

== Athletics ==
- C. K. Fauver
- Edgar Fauver
- Edward Fauver
- John Heisman, football coach in 1892 and 1894
- Elizabeth Lemley, 2026 Olympics gold medalist in moguls, first Oberlin affiliated athlete to compete at the Winter Olympics, accepted for class of 2029, but deferred enrollment until fall 2026
- T. Nelson Metcalf
- Jack Scott, reformist athletic director, 1971–1974
- Tommie Smith, 1968 Olympics gold medalist in the 200 m sprint; anti-racism activist; track coach and sociology faculty, 1972–78
- Moses Fleetwood Walker, first African-American major league baseball player
