= Elizabeth Lord =

Elizabeth Lord may refer to:

- Elizabeth Lord (architect) (1918–1994), Manitoba-based architect
- Elizabeth Blodget Lord (1887–1974), American landscape architect
- Elizabeth Watson Russell Lord (1819–1908), American educator and philanthropist
