= Catherine McBride =

American psychologist

Catherine Alexandra McBride
- Education: Oberlin College; University of Southern California
- Occupations: Psychologist, educator

Catherine Alexandra McBride (formerly McBride-Chang) is a Professor of Developmental Psychology and the Associate Dean for Research for the College of Health and Human Sciences at Purdue University. She is also an Emeritus Professor of Psychology at the Chinese University of Hong Kong (CUHK), where she previously held the Choh-Ming Li Professorship of Psychology.

McBride specializes in the acquisition of early literacy skills. She received her BA in psychology from Oberlin College, Oberlin, Ohio. She received her MA in 1992 and PhD in developmental psychology in 1994 from the University of Southern California, and completed a post-doctoral fellowship at Florida State University in Tallahassee, Florida. She has written two books (namely, Children's Literacy Development (2004; updated 2016) and Coping with Dyslexia, Dysgraphia and ADHD: A Global Perspective (2019) and co-edited three others. She is currently the Past-President of the Society for the Scientific Study of Reading (SSSR).

McBride has served as an associate editor for four journals and authored or coauthored over 230 journal articles. She has also given talks on her work in China, Korea, India, Hong Kong, Singapore, Switzerland, Germany, Canada, Australia, and the United States. She takes a cross-cultural and developmental approach to literacy learning, having published articles on learning to read and to write in many different cultures, languages, and orthographies, including Spanish, Arabic, Hebrew, Chinese, Korean, and English. She is interested in many constructs believed to be central for learning to read and to write, including segmental and suprasegmental phonological sensitivity, morphological awareness, visual-orthographic skills, visual-motor skills, memory, and fluency. She was the founding president of a new society focused on understanding literacy expertise, development, and impairment in Asia, called the Association for Reading and Writing in Asia.

== Selected bibliography ==
=== Books ===
- McBride-Chang, C. & Chen, H.C. (2003). Reading Development in Chinese Children. Westport, CT: Praeger Publishing, ISBN 0897898095
- McBride-Chang, C. (2004). Children's Literacy Development. London: Routledge, ISBN 0340808004
- McBride, C. (2016). Children's Literacy Development: A Cross-cultural Perspective on Learning to Read and Write. Oxford: Routledge, ISBN 1848722877
- Kucircova, N., Snow, C., Grover, V., & McBride, C. (2016). International companion to early literacy education.. Oxford: Routledge
- McBride, C. (2019). Coping with Dyslexia, Dysgraphia and ADHD: A Global Perspective. New York:Routledge, ISBN 1138069671
- Joshi, R.M. & McBride, C. (2019). Handbook of Literacy in Akshara Orthography. Cham: Springer

=== Journal papers ===
- McBride-Chang, C., Cho, J.-R., Liu, H., Wagner, R. K., Shu, H., Zhou, A., Cheuk, C. S.-M., & Muse, A. (2005). "Changing models across cultures: Associations of phonological and morphological awareness to reading in Beijing, Hong Kong, Korea, and America". Journal of Experimental Child Psychology, 92, 140–160.
- Chow, B. W.-Y., McBride-Chang, C., & Burgess, S. (2005) "Phonological processing skills and early reading abilities in Hong Kong Chinese kindergartners learning to read English as a second language". Journal of Educational Psychology, 97, 81–87.
- Chiu, M. M., Chow, B. W.-Y., & McBride-Chang, C. (2007). "Universals and specifics in learning strategies: Explaining adolescent achievement in mathematics, science, and reading across 34 countries". Learning and Individual Differences, 17, 344–365.
- Ip, H. M., Cheung, S. K., Chang, L., & McBride-Chang, C. (2008). "Associations of parenting styles of Filipina domestic helpers and mothers with Hong Kong kindergarten children's social competence". Early Education and Development, 19, 284–301.
- McBride-Chang, C., Lam, F., Lam, C., Doo, S., Wong, S. W. L., & Chow, Y. Y. Y. (2008). "Word recognition and cognitive profiles of Chinese pre-school children at-risk for dyslexia through language delay or familial history of dyslexia". Journal of Child Psychology and Psychiatry, 49, 211–218.
- Chow, B. W.-Y., McBride-Chang, C., & Cheung, H. (2008). "Dialogic reading and morphology training in Chinese children: Effects on language and literacy". Developmental Psychology, 44, 233–244.
- Cheung, S. K., & McBride, C. (2017). "Effectiveness of parent–child number board game playing in promoting Chinese kindergarteners' numeracy skills and Mathematics interest.". Early Education and Development, 28(5), 572-589.
- Zhou, Y., McBride, C., Leung, J. S. M., Wang, Y., Joshi, M., & Farver, J. (2018). "Chinese and English reading-related skills in L1 and L2 Chinese-speaking children in Hong Kong". Language, Cognition and Neuroscience, 33(3), 300–312.
- Yang, X., Chung, K. K. H., & McBride, C. (2018). "Longitudinal contributions of executive functioning and visual-spatial skills to mathematics learning in young Chinese children". Educational Psychology, 1-27.
- Dulay, K. M., Cheung, S. K., & McBride, C. (2019). "Intergenerational transmission of literacy skills among Filipino families". Developmental Science, 00:e12859. https://doi.org/10.1111/desc.12859.
- Lin, D., Sun, H., & McBride, C. (2019). "Morphological awareness predicts the growth rate of Chinese character reading. Developmental Science.". Developmental Science, 00:e12793. https://doi.org/10.1111/desc.12793
