= RoughRider wheelchair =

Type of wheelchair by Ralf Hotchkiss

The RoughRider wheelchair is a low-cost, durable and appropriate technology wheelchair designed for use in developing countries. The design of the RoughRider originally was open-source and has been revised with input from wheelchair users in over 40 countries since 1980. The RoughRider was created to fill the demand for a reliable wheelchair for over 20 million disabled people in the developing world who need a wheelchair and do not have one.

== History ==
The earliest recorded history of a wheelchair was inscribed in stone on a Chinese Sarcophagus in the 6th century A.D. There have been many variations on the basic design since then but standard features always included rear wheels, front caster wheels, footrests, side frames and seating features. Until recently wheelchairs were designed for relatively smooth surfaces and paved streets and were not designed for rugged environments. Thirty years ago, Ralf Hotchkiss, an engineer with paraplegia and a frequent traveler to developing countries, saw the need for a high quality and rugged chair that could withstand conditions in rough terrain. He began a thirty-year process of collaborative design using locally available parts with a cost low enough to be affordable to disabled persons in developing regions. For many years, Ralf and a team would travel to small machine shops in developing countries to teach the technical skills necessary for local production of the RoughRider model. Several of these shops are developing to scale in parts of Africa, Asia, Latin America and the former Soviet Union.

== Design features ==
RoughRider functional design features include: low armrests to enable easy lateral transfers from chair to other surfaces, Pneumatic rear tires which are replaceable in bicycle shops worldwide, and adjustable rear wheel position which optimizes mechanical stability and performance for riders of different abilities. The design includes a long wheelbase with extra-wide front caster wheels that fit under the footrests and prevents tipping forward and is easier to push than standard wheelchair models. The extra wide "Zimbabwe" caster wheels provide a smooth ride over rough ground surfaces while still being able to "float" over soft surfaces like sand without getting stuck. The foldable X-brace allows for storage and transport and allows the seat width to be adjustable. Additional modifications to shorten or lengthen the seat depth and back height are accomplished by adding foam cushions under or behind the seat cushion. Footrest adjustments are made by loosening one bolt on the footrest arm.

== Problems and future design improvements ==
Due to the 7/8" steel tubing used for the sideframes, chosen for low cost and universal availability, the RoughRider weighs about 40 lbs which may be too heavy for some newly injured riders to navigate up steep hills. The RoughRider does have an optional anti-tip bar which makes the rider safer during a backwards wheelie and has only recently added wheelguards that reduce mud and water splatter on the rider. Both of these features are currently under development. There is also a need for a rugged active chair for disabled children in developing countries and a child's version of the RoughRider is currently being tested in South Africa.
