= Willard Warch =

American cellist and music theorist (1909–2002)

- Born: June 6, 1909
- Died: October 12, 2002 (aged 93); Oberlin, Ohio
- Education: Oberlin College
- Occupations: classical cellist, music theorist; U.S. Army Air Corps Band stationed in England
- Notable work: Our First 100 Years; a brief history of the Oberlin College Conservatory of Music

Willard Franklin Warch (June 6, 1909 – October 12, 2002) was an American classical cellist and music theorist from Chicago. He was schoolmaster at Punahou School in Honolulu, first cello with the Honolulu Symphony and a professor of Music and Theory at Oberlin College for 30 years.

Warch was a member of the Oberlin Orchestra cello section from 1927 to 1931 and a student at Oberlin College. In 1931, he graduated, having earned both the B.Mus. and M.Mus. degrees at Oberlin. From 1942 to 1945, Warch served in the U.S. Army Air Corps as a member of the Army Air Corps Band stationed in England. He authored five music study textbooks as well as Our First 100 Years; a brief history of the Oberlin College Conservatory of Music.

He died in Oberlin, Ohio in 2002, aged 93.
