= JAMA Psychiatry =

- Discipline: Psychiatry
- Language: English
- Edited by: Dost Öngür

Publication details
- Former name(s): Archives of General Psychiatry
- History: 1959–present
- Publisher: American Medical Association (United States)
- Frequency: Monthly
- Impact factor: 25.911 (2021)

Standard abbreviations
- ISO 4: JAMA Psychiatry

Indexing
- ISSN: 2168-622X (print); 2168-6238 (web)

Links
- Journal homepage

JAMA Psychiatry (until 2013: Archives of General Psychiatry) is a monthly peer-reviewed medical journal published by the American Medical Association. It covers research in psychiatry, mental health, behavioral sciences, and related fields. The journal was established as Archives of Neurology and Psychiatry in 1919, and was split into two separate journals in 1959: Archives of Neurology and Archives of General Psychiatry. In 2013, their names changed to JAMA Neurology and JAMA Psychiatry, respectively. The editor-in-chief is Dost Öngür (Harvard University, McLean Hospital).

== Abstracting and indexing ==
The journal is abstracted and indexed in Index Medicus/MEDLINE/PubMed. According to Journal Citation Reports, the journal has a 2021 impact factor of 25.911, ranking it 3rd out of 157 journals in the category "Psychiatry".

== See also ==
- List of American Medical Association journals
- List of psychiatry journals
