= John Millott Ellis =

John Millott Ellis (March 27, 1831 – 1894) was a 19th-century abolitionist minister and intellectual who served as acting President of Oberlin College in 1871. He was a professor of philosophy at Oberlin from 1866 to 1896.

== Early life and education ==
Born in rural New Hampshire, Ellis moved with his family to Oberlin, Ohio, in 1840. There he apprenticed at his father's planing mill until he entered Oberlin College in 1847. A spectacular student, Ellis graduated at the top of a class which included Charles G. Finney Jr., son of Charles Grandison Finney, the father of the Second Great Awakening. Ellis went on to teach at the Academy at Lapeer, Michigan, and at Mississippi College. In 1855 he returned to Oberlin for two more years of theological study. He received a degree from the Oberlin Seminary in 1857. In 1858 he joined the faculty at Oberlin as a professor of Greek. He organized the Second Congregational Church in 1860.

== Career ==
In August 1862, in the midst of the American Civil War, Ellis delivered a speech at the local chapel arguing that the immediate emancipation of Negro slaves across the country was essential to victory in the war. His speech was published in newspapers throughout Ohio and the nation at large. The chapel speech predated President Abraham Lincoln's Emancipation Proclamation by a mere three weeks, leading to speculation at the time that Ellis's speech may have given President Lincoln the confidence he needed that there was popular support for his Proclamation.

In 1865, Ellis was ordained a minister. In 1866 he began teaching Mental philosophy and Rhetoric at Oberlin. He was one of the most popular lecturers in his day. In 1871, Ellis became Oberlin College's 10th President. He served only one year in this capacity as he felt that the administrative obligations the job entailed took too much time away from his academic work.

== Later life and death ==
Ellis was a prominent member of the Oberlin community for his entire life, serving as Chief of the Fire Department for several years. In 1861, Ellis became mayor of the town of Oberlin. He successfully petitioned for the construction of railroads through nearby Lorain. He founded the now-dormant Oberlin Arboricultural Association. In 1875, he delivered the eulogy at the funeral for another Oberlin President, Charles Grandison Finney. One year before his death in 1894, Ellis received the first honorary D.D. given by Oberlin in its history.

== Personal life ==
His home was purchased by the college in 1906 and used as a female dormitory called the Ellis Cottage until 1949. He had 5 children by his wife, Minerva E. Tenney. He is the great-great-great-grandfather of present-day political activist, Theo Ellis.
