= Geoffrey Blodgett =

American historian (1931–2001)

- Born: October 13, 1931
- Died: November 15, 2001 (aged 70); Oberlin, Ohio, U.S.
- Education: Oberlin College; Harvard University (PhD)
- Occupation: Historian

Geoffrey Blodgett (October 13, 1931 – November 15, 2001) was Robert S. Danforth Professor of History at Oberlin College, located in Oberlin, Ohio.

== Career ==
As a student at Oberlin from 1949 to 1953, he was a student of Oberlin history professor Robert Samuel Fletcher He was also a wide receiver on the Yeomen, the college's men's football team. After graduating Phi Beta Kappa from Oberlin in 1953, Blodgett served two years with the United States Navy in the Pacific Fleet. He received a PhD at Harvard University in 1961, and returned to the college a year later to join the History Department. His dissertation focused on a group of political reformers of the late 19th century who left the Republican Party to join the Democratic Party, the Mugwumps.

Throughout his career as a professor he focused on the history of architecture, publishing several books and many articles. He also published many articles on the history of Oberlin College, continuing the work of Fletcher. His articles on Oberlin have been collected in Oberlin History. Essays and Impressions (2006).

== Selected publications ==
- Geoffrey Blodgett (1966). The Gentle Reformers: Massachusetts Democrats in the Cleveland Era. Harvard University Press.
- ---- (1985). Oberlin Architecture, College and Town: A Guide to Its Social History. Kent State University Press. ISBN 0-87338-309-5
- Elizabeth A. Brown and Geoffrey Blodgett (1992). Robert Mangold: The Oberlin Window. Oberlin College. ISBN 99925-53-02-2
- ----(1999). Cass Gilbert: The Early Years. Minnesota Historical Society Press. ISBN 0-87351-410-6
- ---- Oberlin History: Essays and Impressions (Kent, Ohio: Kent State University Press, 2006).

== References and further reading ==
- Clayton Koppes (2002). A Tribute to a Scholar. Oberlin Alumni Magazine. Vol 97, No 4.
- Salsich, Anne Cuyler (13 February 2019), Biographical Sketch, Oberlin College Archives
