= Julia Gridley Severance =

American artist (1877–1972)

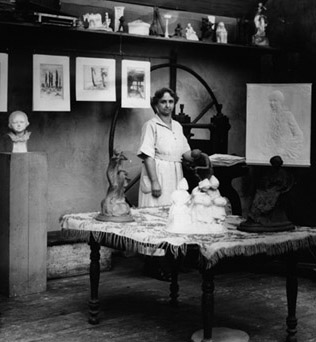
- Julia Gridley Severance, from a 1922 publication
- Born: January 11, 1877; Oberlin, Ohio, U.S.
- Died: March 9, 1972 (aged 95); Chula Vista, California, U.S.
- Occupations: Artist, sculptor, puppeteer

Julia Gridley Severance (January 11, 1877 – March 9, 1972) was an American artist, sculptor and puppeteer. The Julia Severance Faculty Studio at Oberlin College is her former studio, and is named for her.

== Early life and education ==
Severance was born in Oberlin, Ohio, the daughter of James Ralph Severance and Rosa Gridley Severance. Her parents were both Oberlin College alumni; her father was a college administrator. She attended Oberlin College from 1896 to 1900 without completing a degree, and pursued further art studies in Italy, and at the Art Institute of Chicago, the Cleveland Institute of Art, and the Art Students League of New York, where she studied with sculptor James Earle Fraser.

== Career ==
Severance was known for her etchings and as a sculptor for her portrait busts and reliefs. She designed the official seal of Oberlin College in 1911, and her etchings depicting campus buildings were made into postcards and calendars for the college. In 1916 she won a prize for sculpture from the Cleveland Women's Art Club. She spent several winters in Coconut Grove, Florida with her widowed mother, teaching art classes and working in her sculpture studio there. In 1917 Delphine Hanna hosted an exhibit of Severance's sculptures in her Coconut Grove home. She exhibited her works in the home of a friend in Knoxville in 1922, and in 1924 she won first prize for her portrait relief sculptures in a Knoxville fair. She exhibited her works at the Cleveland Museum of Art in 1925.

In 1928 she spent the summer in Italy with her Oberlin friend Parmelia Allen; the pair also had a puppet theatre they built and performed together on regional tours in the 1930s, called the Severance (or Several) Marionettes. They also performed at the Cleveland Museum of Art in 1933.

In 1933 she had a traveling exhibition of her etchings, one of which appeared on the cover of Art News magazine. Severance and Allen moved to San Diego in 1938. She exhibited her work there with the San Diego Art Guild in 1940, and at the La Jolla Art Center in 1942. She took up wood carving in the 1950s, studying with sculptor Donal Hord. In 1962 she traveled to Alaska and British Columbia with another friend, Mrs. Logan Osborn.

== Personal life ==
Severance and Allen lived together in San Diego until Allen died in 1946. Severance died in Chula Vista, California in 1972, aged 95 years. The Julia Severance Faculty Studio at Oberlin College is her former studio, and is named for her. Oberlin College Archives holds a collection of her papers.
