= Flora Crockett =

American painter

- Flora Crockett
- Born: Flora Eva Crockett; April 27, 1892; Grelton, Ohio, US
- Died: July 31, 1979 (aged 87); East Setauket, New York, US
- Spouse: Edmondo Quattrocchi

Flora Crockett (1892–1979) was an American painter whose non-objective abstractions were said by New York Times critic, Roberta Smith, to be "elegant, knowing and at ease, made by a practiced hand." Known for dynamic compositions having layered design elements in exuberant color, she worked independently, without reference to the popular art movements of her time. She did not repeat herself so that, as one critic said, "everything feels discovered." Soon after her marriage in 1918, Crockett traveled to France with her sculptor husband Edmond Quattrocchi. There, she studied at Académie Moderne in Paris and in 1929 was appointed its director. In 1937, newly divorced, she returned from Paris. Three years later she rented an apartment on 14th Street at 8th Avenue in New York where she lived and painted the rest of her life. Throughout her career she supported herself by taking a variety of jobs, including work for the Federal Art Project and in war industries. In her free time both during her working years and after retirement, she produced a body of work which was recognized for its excellence after her death.

== Early life and training ==
Roberta Smith, writing in the New York Times, November 10m 2915

Loosely geometric and modest in size, Ms. Crockett's paintings are elegant, knowing and at ease, made by a practiced hand. They indicate a familiarity with 20th-century abstraction: Mondrian's quietly robust brushwork, and the levitating compositions of Kandinsky, Miró and Léger. They also suggest exposure to American liberators of geometry like the painters Charles Green Shaw and Stuart Davis. But the sharp colors and dynamic compositions feel hip, fresh and very much her own. Ms. Crockett's paintings are in step with their time, a moment after Pop Art and Color Field painting had given color new heat.

Crockett was born and raised on a family farm in northwest Ohio. Intending to become an art teacher, she studied art and mathematics at Oberlin College and, after graduating in 1911, studied art education at the Thomas Training School in Detroit, Michigan. In 1915 she was appointed art supervisor in the Roslyn, New York, public school system. While living in that community she met the Italian-born sculptor, Edmondo Quattrocchi. She and he continued to live there after marrying in 1918, and, in 1924, after he was hired to work on a memorial to the Second Battle of the Marne, they traveled to France. There, Crockett studied at the Sorbonne and the school of the Louvre, while also serving as head of a school for war orphans at Poissy, west of Paris.

== Career ==
A few years later she attended and then became director of a Parisian art school that had been established by Fernand Léger. Called Académie Moderne, the school attracted students from as far away as Japan, South America, and the United States and had as instructors Amédée Ozenfant and Aleksandra Ekster as well as Léger. Crockett left the school in the early 1930s during a turbulent period when, no longer able to tolerate Quattrocchi's drinking and womanizing, she initiated divorce proceedings against him. In 1937, the year the divorce was finally granted in French court, she was given a solo exhibition at Galerie La Fenêtre Ouverte. She was also awarded a bronze medal for a painting she showed at the International Exposition in Paris that year.

At the end of 1937 Crockett returned to the United States. She lived in New York, where, mixing with the city's artists and art dealers, she met Blanche Bonestell, the owner of a gallery on 57th Street, who took some paintings of hers on consignment. In 1938 she taught free art classes at the state normal school in Potsdam, New York as an employee of the Federal Art Project and the following year was given a solo show in Potsdam town library. In 1940 she returned to Manhattan where she rented an apartment at the corner of 14th Street and 8th Avenue where she lived and painted for the rest of her life.

With the entry of the United States in World War II, Crockett supported herself by working a succession of jobs in New York's war industries. Obtaining little income from her painting, she continued to work in engineering and design positions for New York employers until, at age 74, she was able to retire and devote her remaining years to producing art.

In 1946 Crockett was given a solo exhibition at the Bonestell Gallery and during the 1940s and 1950s her work appeared in group shows at both Bonestell and the Provincetown Art Association in Cape Cod. In 1942, as a member of the Bombshell Artists' Group, she showed three paintings in an exhibition held by the group at the Riverside Museum. In 1965, after she retired from the last of the jobs she had used to support herself, she contributed work to a show held at the Overseas Press Club in New York. From that time to 1973 she produced paintings that have been considered to be some of her finest work. Crockett died in 1979. In 2015 and again in 2017 she was given retrospective exhibitions by the Meredith Ward Fine Art gallery in Manhattan's Upper East Side.

=== Artistic style ===
Flora Crockett, Untitled, 1941, oil on canvas board, 30 x 22 inches

Early in her career, Crockett produced work that was somber and, while abstract, not entirely non-objective. An untitled painting of 1941 shows geometric objects in red, gray, and black colors along with what are clearly two smoke stacks, one emitting smoke or steam. This work reminded a critic of paintings by the American surrealist, Kay Sage.

Flora Crockett, untitled, undated (between 1940 and 1960), oil on canvas board, 24 x 20 inches

Crockett's later work was almost entirely non-objective, containing geometric and biomorphic forms in bright colors. Critics considered this work to be characterized by a spirit of independence and tough-mindedness, uniquely her own.

An untitled and undated work, showing a ring-like object at an angle to the ground, is typical. The viewer sees both the inside and the outside of the red ring, a stream of color passes through the ring, and near the top of the ring there is a leaf-shaped object in yellow. In another representative work, "66," painted in 1966, there a band of yellow-orange slinking among red objects, along with blocks of blue and pink and a vertical red on the right edge. One of her last paintings, "1972-3" of 1972, shows the dynamism of her late style.

== Personal life and family ==
Crockett was born on April 27, 1892, in Grelton, Ohio. Her father was Malcolm Crockett, who owned and farmed 160 acres in Grelton, Ohio. Relations of the family to which Davy Crockett belonged, the Crocketts were among the first settlers in northwest Ohio. Malcolm was a prominent member of the local community, working to improve its school and to achieve local infrastructure improvements. He organized, supervised, and taught in the Sunday school of the Methodist church to which he belonged. In 1881 he married Mary E. Wheaton in Barre, Vermont. She had graduated from the Barre Academy (Note: Founded in 1852, the Barre Academy was a non-sectarian private school that provided a rigorous education to students wishing to enter college as well as students interested in careers in teaching or business. It ceased operation in 1885, not long after the death of its founder, Jacob S. Spaulding.) in 1873 and subsequently attended Oberlin College. After leaving Oberlin, and until she married, she taught school in Vermont, Minnesota, and Ohio.

Raised on her family's farm, Crockett attended local schools and then Oberlin College, where she majored in art and mathematics, graduating in 1911. During the next three years she studied art at the Thomas Training School in Detroit, Michigan, and in 1915 became supervisor of art instruction in the public schools of Roslyn, Long Island, New York. While living in Roslyn, she met and in 1918 married the Italian-born sculptor, Edmondo Quattrocchi. The two moved to Paris in 1924, Edmondo to work on a World War I statue, and Crockett to serve as director of a school for war orphans in Poissy called L'École de Champfleury. A few years later she began to study at the Académie Moderne in Paris and a bit later became its director. In 1933, complaining of his drinking and womanizing, Crockett sued Quattrocchi for divorce, and four years later was granted her freedom. She returned to New York in 1937 taking an apartment at 233 West 14th Street where she lived most of the rest of her life. (Note: All but the first sentence of this paragraph has as its source an article written for Arts Nantucket in 2016 by Crockett's great niece, Arlene O'Reilly.)

Until she retired in the mid-1960s, Crockett supported herself in a variety of occupations, including design, sales, engineering, teaching, and art administration. In the late 1930s she worked for the Federal Arts Project of the Works Projects Administration and during World War II and for some time thereafter she worked as an inspector of artillery parts in the Brooklyn Navy Yard.

Crockett died in St. Vincent's hospital on July 31, 1979.
