= Kalan Sherrard =

American anarchist

- Born: Bellevue, WA
- Education: Oberlin College (2010)
- Occupation: Busker
- Known for: Performance Art, Puppeteering
- Notable work: Beat Up Trump

Kalan Sherrard is a street performer, puppeteer, and former Occupy Wall Street protester. New York Magazine describes zz as "NYC’s Most Avant-Garde Nihilist Subway Performer".

In December 2014, Sherrard was arrested in Florida while protesting an Art Basel art show on charges of disorderly conduct and resisting arrest without violence. Sherrard says zz was arrested twice at Art Basel. In January 2015, zz was interviewed by the New York Post about the bank robbery by Joseph Gibbons, with whom zz shared a jail cell.

It was reported in March 2016 that the performance artist dressed up as Republican Presidential Candidate Donald Trump, allowing paying customers to hit, choke, and even urinate on zz.
