= Shawn Decker (sound artist) =

Shawn L. Decker
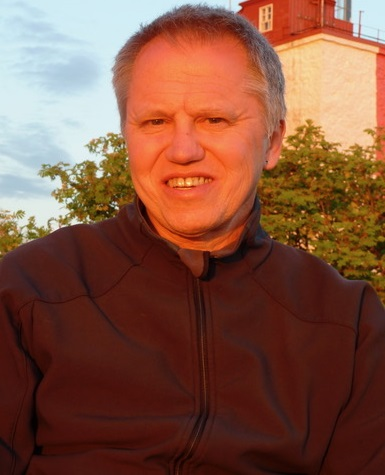
- Occupations: Sound artist, musician, composer, and academic

Academic background
- Education: Bachelor of Music in Music Composition; Master of Music in Music Theory and Composition; Doctor of Music in Music Theory and Composition
- Alma mater: Oberlin College Conservatory of Music; Northwestern University

Academic work
- Institutions: School of the Art Institute of Chicago; Northwestern University; Sketchbook Brewing
- Website: shawndecker.com

Shawn L. Decker is a sound artist, musician, composer, and academic who creates sound and electronic media installations and writes music for live performance, film, and video. He is a professor of Sound and Media Art at the School of the Art Institute of Chicago (SAIC) and is the founder and partner of Sketchbook Brewing.

Decker operates at the intersection of music composition, visual arts, and performance, utilizing both physical and electronic media to explore natural and artificial environments. He incorporates technology and technological processes alongside the study of birdsong, ornithology, and traditional elements like Irish and American folk fiddle traditions. His work merges physical techniques from sculpture with environmental sound and music performance. He has frequently collaborated with artists Jan-Erik Andersson in Turku, Finland, and Anne Wilson in Chicago.

== Education ==
Decker received a Bachelor of Music in music composition from Oberlin College Conservatory of Music in 1981, where he also pursued a minor in mathematics. He continued his studies at Northwestern University, earning a Master of Music in music theory and composition in 1982, followed by a Doctor of Music in the same field in 1987.

== Career ==
From 1982 to 1988, he was the assistant director of operations at the Northwestern University Computer Music Studio. Since 1991, he has been a professor at SAIC, teaching experimental art, sound, and media. He was the chair of the Art and Technology Department for two three-year terms and led the Sound Department from 1988 to 1990 and again from 2006 to 2009. In 1997, he chaired the International Symposium on Electronic Art (ISEA) held in Chicago. Alongside Cesar Marron, he co-founded Sketchbook Brewing in 2013, a community-supported brewery.

== Works ==
Decker's work has been featured in both solo and collaborative exhibitions. These include the Museum of Art and Design in New York, the Kiasma Museum in Helsinki, CAM Houston, the Pritzker Pavilion in Chicago's Millennium Park, the Chicago Cultural Center, the Victoria and Albert Museum in London, the Minnesota Museum of American Art, the Klosterruine in Berlin, the 21st Century Museum in Kanazawa Japan, Waino Aalto Museum in Turku, Finland and the Indianapolis Museum of Art.

Decker's public work Prairie was commissioned by the city of Chicago in 2013 and was exhibited at the Chicago Cultural Center's Sydney Yeats Gallery. This electro-acoustic sound installation utilized over 400 separate loudspeakers within a large-scale kinetic sculpture.

Decker collaborated with Mordine Dance Theatre on the performance Truth Spin, where dancers used light sensors to manipulate sound.

== Sound installations and performances ==
- The Night Sounds (1999)
- Bird's Nest Berlin (2002)
- Bird's Nest Helsinki (2004)
- Errant Behaviors (2004)
- Green (2006)
- Bird's Nest Evanston (2007)
- Train Time (2008)
- Sound Bridge (2009)
- Prairie (2013)
- Sounding Nest Sauna (2016)
- Factory Floor (2019)
- Mare (2020)
- Bird's Nest Upsalla (2022)

== Bibliography ==
- Decker, S. and G. Kendall. 1985. "A Unified Approach to the Editing of Time-ordered Events." In B. Truax, ed. 1985. Proceedings of the 1985 International Computer Music Conference. San Francisco: Computer Music Association. Pp. 69-78
- Decker S. et al. 1986. "A Modular Environment for Sound Synthesis and Composition." Computer Music Journal 10(4): pp. 28-41
- Gary S. Kendall, William L. Martens, and Shawn L. Decker. "Spatial Reverberation: Discussion and Demonstration." In Max Mathews and John Pierce eds. 1989 Current Directions in Computer Music Research. Cambridge, Mass. MIT Press. pp. 65-87
- Decker S., and G. Kendall. 1984. "A Modular Approach to Sound Synthesis Software." In W. Buxton, ed. 1984. Proceedings of the 1984 Computer Music Conference. Toronto: University of Toronto. pp. 243-250.
