= Ralf Hotchkiss =

American inventor

- Occupations: Inventor, designer
- Years active: 1969 - present
- Known for: Founder, Whirlwind Wheelchair International

Ralf Hotchkiss is an inventor and designer whose company, Whirlwind Wheelchair International, designs wheelchairs for use and manufacture in developing countries, involving wheelchair riders in all of its projects and activities. The organization's mission is "To make it possible for every person in the developing world who needs a wheelchair to obtain one that will lead to maximum personal independence and integration into society."

== Career ==
Following a motorcycle accident in his junior year at Oberlin University in 1966, Hotchkiss became a paraplegic. Immediately after leaving rehab, Hotchkiss realized how fragile and difficult his wheelchair was to use after hitting a crack in the pavement with the wheelchair, which damaged it to the point of immobility. The crash kickstarted Hotchkiss’ passion for reinventing the wheelchair. Hotchkiss is a 1969 graduate of Oberlin College. Following graduation from Oberlin, he worked for Ralph Nader in Washington D.C. where he founded the Center for Concerned Engineering.

Hotchkiss published the design of his appropriate technology wheelchair along with a collection of information designed to guide the start of a small business to manufacture the design. The 1985 book, "Independence through Mobility: A Guide Through the Manufacture of the ATI-Hotchkiss Wheelchair," now available in PDF form through the Center for International Rehabilitation, is an early example of open design or open source hardware. Hotchkiss also advocates for disabled people in developing countries after being asked to help a group of disabled mechanics in Nicaragua, where often up to five people would have to share single wheelchair. Since then, Hotchkiss has been working on developing a wheelchair called the RoughRider, which is lightweight, inexpensive, and designed to handle difficult riding conditions. In developing these wheelchairs and open-sourcing his designs, Hotchkiss hopes to create a competitive wheelchair industry around the world.

In 1989, Hotchkiss was awarded a MacArthur Fellowship. In the early 1990's, Ralf taught a wheelchair-building class at SFSU to post graduate students in the RETP program.
