= Elizabeth Lord (architect) =

Canadian architect

Elizabeth Merle Lord (born Elizabeth Merle Crawford in Fort Garry; 1918 – 20 May 1994) was a Manitoba-based architect. Lord graduated from the University of Manitoba's School of Architecture in 1939. In 1944, she became the first woman to register with the Manitoba Association of Architects. That same year, she registered with the Royal Architectural Institute of Canada.

== Career ==
Lord held various positions in her early career, including with the North American Lumber Company, Crawford Painting, and Dominion Government Naval Treasury. Eventually, in the mid-1950s, Lord began her own architectural practice. Working out of her home in St. Norbert, Winnipeg, Lord worked on designs for homes, schools, and commercial buildings. Lord was also the chairman of the Welfare Council committee on housing in the mid-1950s.

Lord retired as a practicing architect in 1976.
