= Aisha Cousins =

American artist (born 1978)

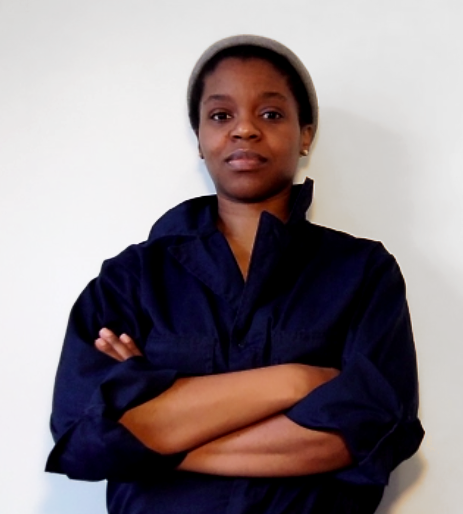
- Born: 1978 (age 47–48); Boston, MA
- Education: Oberlin College
- Known for: Creating performance art scores for Black audiences

Aisha Cousins (born 1978) is New York-based artist. Cousins writes performance art scores that encourage black audiences to explore their parallel histories and diverse aesthetics. Her work has been widely performed at art institutions such as Weeksville Heritage Center, BRIC, Project Row Houses, the Kitchen, the Brooklyn Museum of Art, MoCADA, and MoMA PS1.

== Early life and education ==
Cousins was born in Boston, Massachusetts and is of Afro-American and Caribbean descent.

In 2000, Cousins received a B.A. in Studio Art with coursework in Black Studies and Sociology from Oberlin College.

== Career ==
From 2008 to 2012, Cousins worked as a performance artist, doing private studies and working with Fluxus artists Ben Vautier and Geoff Hendricks. In 2012, she was awarded a grant from the Brooklyn Arts Council to produce a guide for her project designed for black youths whose schools have lost visual arts funding.

=== Artistic practice ===
Aisha Cousins writes performance art scores – do-it-yourself instructions – for live art projects that engage black audiences from different backgrounds. Through her work Cousins encourages audiences and participants to explores ideas around beauty and the changes taking place in black communities. In 2011, Cousins formed Transmission Completed, a non-profit project from her arts studio, to deliver her art to black neighborhoods to engage groups of people that would not normally feel comfortable viewing art in a museum or gallery.

=== "Diva Dutch" series ===
In Diva Dutch, Cousins worked with black women from around the world. She worked with local hairdressers to braid 15-foot-long cornrows, which were used as a double Dutch ropes that were connected to the heads of black women. The braided double Dutch rope connects the two women literally and metaphorically to the social history of double Dutch.

"It's a natural evolution of things that black girls in black urban areas across the country already do", says Cousins.

Cousins performed Diva Dutch on the streets of Bed-Stuy (Brooklyn), Brixton (London) and Barbès-Rochechouart (Paris).

=== "From Here I Saw What Happened and I Could Not Understand" ===
Also known as the "Obama Skirt Project."

In this series, Cousins continues her ongoing engagement with black audiences to explore ideas of beauty and the different realities of modern black life.

"The Obama Skirt Project" sets out to create dialogues between black women using African textiles printed with images of Barack Obama’s face. Cousins was inspired by a trip she took to Senegal when she was 16. She was drawn to the fabrics worn by Senegalese women featuring the faces of presidential candidates. Cousins was taken aback that the faces on the Senegalese skirts were black, which she wasn't used to seeing in the United States.

In 2008, moved by Obama's election, Cousins chose to collect and wear different African fabrics from South Africa, Mali, Senegal and Ghana that were printed with Obama’s image. Cousins used African tailors in her Brooklyn neighborhood, to create skirts and dresses that she wore every day for the first year of his presidency.

The following year, she began recruiting other black women in her community to wear them as well. She used the project as a way to encourage a communal discussion about the significance of Obama’s presidency.

=== "The Soulville Census" ===
The 2015 Soulville Census is the "sister project" to "From Here I Saw What Happened and I Could Not Understand" also known as "The Obama Skirt Project". The 2015 Soulville Census took place from May to October 2015 in Brooklyn, New York. A team of "census workers" roamed Brooklyn's black cultural festivals asking Soulville Census questions to document just how diverse the USA's black population is. Along the way, the "census workers" engaged black Americans from a range of backgrounds in exploring how the terms used to describe blackness can enhance or undermine the understanding of the state of black America. Some of the favorite responses chosen. The Soulville Census is a performance art score (set of written instructions for a live art project). The score reads simply "Create a census that gathers the data the 2010 US Census missed." It was composed by artist Aisha Cousins in response to the Census Bureau's decision to lump black folks of all backgrounds (Afro-American, Caribbean, and African) into a single checkbox.

=== "Beauty Shop Project" ===
In 2014, Cousins spoke at University of Delaware about ideas of beauty and changes taking place in students' worlds. The goal of the "Beauty Shop Project" is to generate research about how community-based black barber and beauty shops can be sources of creativity and ideas directed towards improving quality of life, proactive citizenship and forming stronger communities.

== Selected performances and exhibitions ==
- 2008–2013: "Diva Dutch" performed at:
  - Downstreet Art Festival, North Adams, MA
  - Come Out and Play. Times Square, NY
  - Project Row Houses, Round 31. Houston, TX
  - Tennessee State University. Nashville, TN
- 2011: New Museum. New York, NY, "The Top 4 Reasons the Democrats Lost the Election (Steve Harvey Style)", performed at Alpha's Bet Is Not Over Yet: Steffani Jemison and Friends."
- 2011: MoMA PS1, New York, NY, "How to Listen To Lil Wayne (for Nia, Nya, and Kamaria)" performed by Clifford Owens, Clifford Owens: Anthology
- 2011–2014: Brooklyn Museum. Brooklyn, NY, "Sit"
- 2012: Weeksville Heritage Center, Brooklyn, NY, "The Soulville Census"
- 2013: BRIC Rotunda Gallery. Brooklyn, NY, "Cultural Fluency"
- 2014: Brooklyn Museum. Brooklyn, NY, "Crossing Brooklyn: Art from Bushwick, Bed-Stuy, and Beyond"

== Awards and residencies ==
- 2013: The Laundromat Project's Create Change Public Artist in Residence for BedStuy (Brooklyn, NY)
- 2014–15: Franklin Furnace Fund Recipient, Brooklyn, NY, for "Soulville Census"
- 2014–15: Fireworks Residency Award (collaboration with Greg Tate and Burnt Sugar the Arkestra Chamber), BRIC. Brooklyn, NY.
