= Laurence Thomas =

American philosopher (1949–2025)

- Born: 1949
- Died: December 27, 2025 (aged 76); Jamesville, New York, U.S.

Education
- Education: University of Pittsburgh

Philosophical work
- Era: Contemporary philosophy
- Region: Western philosophy
- School: Analytic
- Institutions: Syracuse University, University of North Carolina at Chapel Hill
- Main interests: Social philosophy, multiculturalism

Laurence Thomas (1949 – December 27, 2025) was an American philosopher. He was Professor Emeritus of Philosophy and Political Science at Syracuse University. Thomas is noted for his work on moral luck, social philosophy and American Blacks and Jews.

== Background ==
Thomas was born in 1949. He died in Jamesville, New York, on December 27, 2025, at the age of 76.

== Works ==
Thomas asserts that we owe special "moral deference" to what he calls "diminished social category" people, that is, to individuals who belong to groups that are unjustly undervalued, we owe a presumption in favor of that person's account of her experiences, for example, if a black woman in a white society claims that she has been subjected to racism, her allegation must be taken especially seriously.

He had held appointments at Syracuse University, University of North Carolina at Chapel Hill, Notre Dame, University of Maryland, and Oberlin College, and in 1994 was a visiting scholar in the Religion Department at the University of Michigan. He was Andrew Mellon Faculty Fellow at Harvard University in 1978–79, received an NEH award to conduct a seminar on "Competing Rights Claims" in the summer of 1981, and was a Fellow of the National Humanities Center in 1982–83. He had given the Lawrence Kohlberg Lecture at the Association of Moral Education (1993) and the fifth Meyer Warren Tenenbaum and Labelle Tenenbaum Lecture at the University of South Carolina.

Thomas's teaching has been widely noted and praised, including feature in the Education Section of The New York Times in 1992. He was named Syracuse University's Scholar-Teacher of the Year in 1993. In July 1997, he presented the Kovler Lectures at the Medical School of the University of Cape Town, South Africa. These lectures will become part of his forthcoming book on moral objectivity and evil. He has been the Lincoln Lecturer (Fall 2002) at Arizona State University and in October 2000, he lectured before Queen Beatrix of the Netherlands.

Laurence Thomas is the author of more than 100 articles. He has written extensively on the topic of friendship. Articles by Thomas not related to friendship include "Forgiving the Unforgivable", which appeared in Moral Philosophy and the Holocaust (edited by Eve Garrard and Geoffrey Scarre) and "Group Autonomy and Narrative Identity" which appeared in Blacks and Jews (edited by Paul Berman) and "Moral Deference" which appeared in Theorizing Multiculturalism (edited by Cynthia Willet).

One of Laurence Thomas's most highly regarded essays is entitled "Being Moral and Handling the Truth". It was published in Social Philosophy and Policy. In this discussion about the morality of lying Thomas gives an example of when a lie can actually be virtuous, such as lying at a friend's wedding that one has just learned that one is terminally ill.

== Books ==
- Living Morally: A Psychology of Moral Character (Temple University Press, 1989)
- Vessels of Evil (Temple University Press, 1993)
- Sexual Orientation and Human Rights (Rowman & Littlefield, 1999)
- The Family and the Political Self (Cambridge University Press, 2005)
- In My Next Life I'll Be White (Speaking Out, 1990)
