= Elaine Hill =

American Health and Environmental Economist

Elaine L. Hill
- Born: Rochester, New York, U.S.

Academic background
- Education: Oberlin College (B.A.); Cornell University (Ph.D.)

Academic work
- Discipline: Health economics, Environmental economics
- Institutions: University of Rochester
- Awards: NIH Director's Early Independence Award (2015); Raymond Vernon Memorial Award (2024)
- Website: www.elainelhill.com

Elaine Lawren Hill is an American health and environmental economist, Dean's Professor of Public Health Sciences, and a professor of Economics and Obstetrics and Gynecology at the University of Rochester. She is a research associate in the Economics of Health, Children and Families, and Environment and Energy Economics programs at the National Bureau of Economic Research (NBER).

== Early life and education ==
Hill studied economics and mathematics at Oberlin College, where she received her B.A. in 2005. While an undergraduate, she received the Albert Rees Assistantship to the President's Council of Economic Advisers in 2003, during the administration of President George W. Bush. She received her Ph.D. from Cornell University in 2014.

== Career and research ==
Hill joined the University of Rochester in 2014. Her research is at the intersection of health economics and environmental economics and examines how environmental exposures and health policy affect health and human capital.

Hill's early research examined the health consequences of hydraulic fracturing and shale gas development. In 2012, while a doctoral student at Cornell University, Hill presented her research on the health effects of hydraulic fracturing at a New York State Senate hearing on fracking. In 2015, she received the NIH Director's Early Independence Award, and in 2016, she was featured by NIH Director Francis Collins in the NIH Director's Blog Creative Minds series. In 2024, she received the Raymond Vernon Memorial Award from the Association for Public Policy Analysis and Management for her work on drinking-water quality and health.

In 2026, Hill was selected for the Hedwig van Ameringen Executive Leadership in Academic Medicine (ELAM) fellowship. Her research has received coverage in The New York Times, The Washington Post, The Atlantic, Scientific American, Newsweek, New Scientist, ABC News, STAT, and Modern Healthcare.

== Personal life ==
Hill was born in Rochester, New York, to Robert L. Hill, a physician who received his M.D. from the University of Rochester, and Sandra B. Hill, who earned a master's degree in mathematics from the university and taught middle school math. Through her father, she is a granddaughter of nuclear physicist David L. Hill, who worked on the Manhattan Project, and Mary Shadow, an educator and former member of the Tennessee House of Representatives. Hill lives in Rochester with her husband and son.

== Selected works ==
- Hill, Elaine L.; Ma, Lala (2017). "Shale Gas Development and Drinking Water Quality." American Economic Review. 107 (5): 522–525. doi:10.1257/aer.p20171133.
- Hill, Elaine L. (2018). "Shale Gas Development and Infant Health: Evidence from Pennsylvania." Journal of Health Economics.
- Hill, Elaine L.; Slusky, David J. G.; Ginther, Donna K. (2019). "Reproductive Health Care in Catholic-Owned Hospitals." Journal of Health Economics.
- Boslett, Andrew; Denham, Alina; Hill, Elaine L.; Adams, Meredith C. B. (2019). "Unclassified Drug Overdose Deaths in the Opioid Crisis: Emerging Patterns of Inequity." Journal of the American Medical Informatics Association.
- Boslett, Andrew; Denham, Alina; Hill, Elaine L. (2020). "Using Contributing Causes of Death Improves Prediction of Opioid Involvement in Unclassified Drug Overdoses in U.S. Death Records." Addiction.
- Hill, Elaine L.; Ma, Lala (2021). "The Fracking Concern with Water Quality." Science.
- Willis, Mary D.; Hill, Elaine L.; Harris, Lena; et al. (2022). "A Population-Based Cohort Study of Traffic Congestion and Infant Growth Using Connected Vehicle Data." Science Advances.
- Hill, Elaine L.; Ma, Lala (2022). "Drinking Water, Fracking and Infant Health." Journal of Health Economics.
- DiSalvo, Richard W.; Hill, Elaine L. (2024). "Drinking Water Contaminant Concentrations and Birth Outcomes." Journal of Policy Analysis and Management.
