= Helen Blackwell =

American chemist and molecular biologist

Helen E. Blackwell (born 1972) is an American organic chemist and chemical biologist. She is a professor at the University of Wisconsin–Madison.

== Education ==
Blackwell is a native of Shaker Heights, Ohio and was educated as an undergraduate at Oberlin College, receiving a Bachelor of Arts degree in chemistry in 1994. She received a Ph.D. in organic chemistry from the California Institute of Technology in 1999 working with Robert Grubbs.

== Career and research ==
Nearing the end of her doctoral education in 1999, Blackwell gained an interest in biology and joined Stuart Schreiber's lab at Harvard University. At the time, the lab was focusing on animal models, but Blackwell decided to work with plants. During her research, Blackwell identified several small-molecule sirtuin inhibitors in Arabidopsis plants.

Blackwell's research utilizes chemical probes—synthesized using solution-phase and solid-phase synthesis, and combinatorial chemistry—to better understand bacterial communication and interactions between a microbe and its host, more specifically, how plants and animals react to microbe invasion, and how bacteria use quorum sensing to determine when to attack their host.

Blackwell is a fellow of the American Association for the Advancement of Science, and has received the Agnes Fay Morgan Research Award.

== Publications ==
Blackwell has written more than 130 academic journal papers, she is the co-author of "Identification of a Class of Small Molecule Inhibitors of the Sirtuin Family of NAD-dependent Deacetylases by Phenotypic Screening". The Journal of Biological Chemistry., Blackwell, Helen E.; O'Leary, Daniel J.; Chatterjee, Arnab K.; Washenfelder, Rebecca A.; Bussmann, D. Andrew; Grubbs, Robert H. (2000). "New Approaches to Olefin Cross-Metathesis". Journal of the American Chemical Society. 122 (1): 58–71. Bibcode:2000JAChS.122...58B. doi:10.1021/ja993063u., and Geske, Grant D.; Wezeman, Rachel J.; Siegel, Adam P.; Blackwell, Helen E. (2005). "Small Molecule Inhibitors of Bacterial Quorum Sensing and Biofilm Formation". Journal of the American Chemical Society. 127 (37): 12762–12763. Bibcode:2005JAChS.12712762G. doi:10.1021/ja0530321. PMID 16159245.
