= Josh Emmons =

American novelist

- Born: 1973 (age 52–53)
- Education: University of California, Santa Cruz; Oberlin College; Iowa Writers' Workshop (MFA)
- Occupation: Novelist

Josh Emmons (born 1973) is an American novelist who was raised in Northern California. He studied at UC Santa Cruz, Oberlin College and the Iowa Writers' Workshop (2002). Emmons has an MFA from University of Iowa, from which he also received a teaching fellowship. Emmons published his first book, The Loss of Leon Meed, in 2005. Set in his native northern California, about the varied responses of ten small-town residents to a stranger's mysterious appearances and disappearances, it was a Book Sense pick and winner of a James Michener-Copernicus Society of America Award, and has been translated into several languages. His second, Prescription for a Superior Existence, which explores the intersections of faith, religion and desire, came out in 2008. His latest book, "A Moral Tale and Other Moral Tales," comes out April 2017 by Dzanc. His fiction and non-fiction have been published in various magazines and newspapers.

Emmons has taught at the University of the Arts, Loyola University Chicago, the University of Iowa, Whitman College, and elsewhere. He has been teaching at University of California, Riverside since at least 2014, having the role of Associate Professor of Creative Writing as of 2023.

One source indicates Emmons lives with his wife in New Orleans, but the date is not clear.

== Works ==
=== Novels ===
- Prescription for a Superior Existence (Scribner, 2008)
- The Loss of Leon Meed (Scribner, 2005)

=== Short stories ===
- Emmons, Josh. "Concord". FiveChapters. Archived from the original on 28 August 2008.

=== Collections ===
- A Moral Tale: And Other Moral Tales

=== Essays ===
- Emmons, Josh (14 January 2008). "You Can't Always Have Acrobatic Sex". Esquire.

== Honors ==
- New York Times Noteworthy Paperback
- PEN Writer's Grant
- James Michener-Copernicus Society of America Award
- Book Sense Pick
