= Anne Eugenia Felicia Morgan =

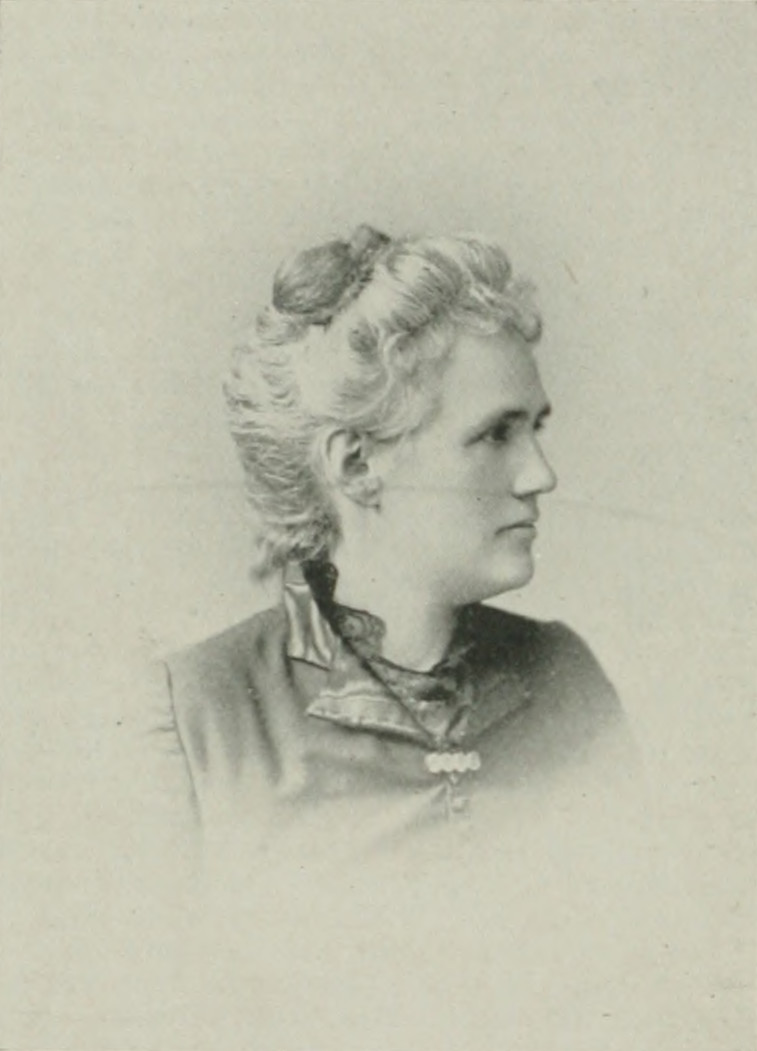
- "A woman of the century"
- Born: October 3, 1845; Oberlin, Ohio, U.S.
- Died: December 23, 1909 (aged 64); Santa Clara County, California
- Education: Oberlin College
- Occupations: professor, philosopher, writer, game inventor
- Writing career
- Language: English

Anne Eugenia Felicia Morgan (October 3, 1845 – December 23, 1909) was an American professor, philosopher, writer, and game inventor from the U.S. state of Ohio. Remembered as a philosopher of rare ability, she united a poet's insight with logic, developing a system of thought marked by originality and power. As an instructor, she led students to do their own thinking, aiming rather to teach philosophizing than to impose any dogma of human opinion.

== Early years and education ==
Anne Eugenia Felicia Morgan was born October 3, 1845, in Oberlin, Ohio. Her father, Rev. John Morgan, D. D., was one of the earliest professors in Oberlin College. Called to the chair of New Testament literature and exegesis upon the opening of the theological seminary, in 1835, he retained his official connection with the college during 45 years, and was always one of the leading spirits in the institution. The mother was of a New Haven family, named Leonard who studied chemistry in Yale College. The Leonard family removed to Oberlin in 1837. The mother studied at Oberlin College, but in her sophomore year she married Prof. John Morgan. Had she completed the academic course, she would have been the first woman in the United States to receive the bachelor's degree. Morgan's three brothers were all musically gifted; all three came to New York City, and all died comparatively young. One of the brothers, William H. Morgan, was principal bass in the Trinity Church choir. John Paul Morgan was an organist and composer.

Morgan studied psychological interpretation of literature, music and art. Throughout her collegiate course she was distinguished for brilliant scholarship, notably in the classics. The appointment to write the Greek oration was assigned to her as an honor in her junior year. She declared that the distinction of being the earliest woman to receive that college honor was due to her mother's choice of preferring to be a homemaker since this prepared her for classical scholarship. Inheriting from her father a mind essentially philosophical, she was always in close sympathy with his thinking and, after graduation, pursued theological studies in his classes. She graduated from Oberlin College in 1866 with a B.A. degree. In 1869, she received the degree of M.A. from this same institution. Morgan studied philosophy in Germany (1872–74) and returned to Europe for further studies during the periods of 1886-87 and 1893–94.

== Career ==
In New York City and Newark, New Jersey, for three years, Morgan conducted classes in philosophy and literature, devoting considerable time to music and the study of harmony with her brother, John Paul, who at that time, was director of music in Trinity Church. In those years there came to her mind many revelations of the philosophy to be discovered through embodiments of human thought and life in literature and music. Her vivid interest in the philosophical aspects of language and art led her to pursue studies in Europe for fifteen months. In 1875, she taught Greek and Latin in Oberlin College. In 1877, she accepted an appointment to teach in the classical department of Vassar College. That work was undertaken in her characteristically philosophical way, always seeking explanations beyond the forms of language in the laws of the mind-effort that formed them. In 1878, she was appointed to the professorship of philosophy in Wellesley College.

In 1887, Morgan published a small volume entitled Scripture Studies in the Origin and Destiny of Man. Her book entitled The White Lady is a study of the ideal conception of human conduct in great records of thought, and is a presentation of lecture outlines and notes on the philosophical interpretation of literature.

== Bellecycle ==
In 1897, Morgan invented and published a game called the "Bellecycle". Its scores served in experimental psychology as records of efficient force of player.

Bellecycle was described as a game suitable for kindergarten or home, under the trees or in the playroom. When properly adjusted, there is attached to wall or tree a target, from whose center extends a rod, and from whose base drops a net held in position by a circle. Seven strong rings of different sizes and colors, together with a set of cues, complete the apparatus. Several different games can be played. Bellecycle itself suggests a combination of grace-hoops and ring-toss. With the cues, the rings are to be tossed thru the circle over the rod. Every muscle was incorporated through non-violent exercise. The game could be used in kindergarten, or for older children or adults. It requires eight people, and can be accompanied by music. Priced at US$3.75, it was made by the Morgan Bellecycle Company of Oberlin, Ohio.

== Selected works ==
- 1886, The White Lady
- 1887, Scripture Studies on the Origin and Destiny of Man
- 1889, Philosophical studies in literature
- 1897, The bellecycle : a drama of aesthetic athletics : being the vacation games and exercises of Anne Eugenia Morgan, interpreted by her Sprite of recreation
