= Martha Moody =

American author (born 1955)

- Born: August 8, 1955 (age 71); Ohio, U.S.
- Education: Oberlin College
- Occupations: Novelist, physician
- Writing career
- Notable works: Best Friends, The Office of Desire

Martha Moody (born August 8, 1955) is an American author. Her first novel, Best Friends, was published by Riverhead Books in 2001 and became a Washington Post national bestseller. Her second novel, The Office of Desire, was published in 2007 and was named one of Kirkus Reviews "Best Books of the Year." Sometimes Mine, Moody's third novel, was published in 2009.

== Life ==
Moody was born and raised in Ohio. She graduated from Oberlin College with a degree in English. During her junior year of college, Moody took a trip with her Spanish professor to South America to interview women poets, and after observing the poor health conditions there, decided to pursue a career in healthcare. She received her MD from the University of Cincinnati College of Medicine. Moody worked as a private practice internist for fifteen years, but quit after Best Friends’ publication. Currently, she volunteers at a clinic for the working poor in Dayton.

Since 2007, Moody has led a volunteer group every summer to teach English in the Arab-Israeli village of Deir al-Assad, in the northern Galilee region of Israel.

In March, 2011, in acknowledgement of her philanthropy, Moody was honored as a 2011 YWCA Woman of Influence.

== Literary career ==
Martha Moody’s short story "Like the Arrival of Angels" was a finalist for The Best American Short Stories of 1985.

Her debut novel, Best Friends, which tracks the long-term relationship between two friends who meet in college, was published in 2001. It became a national bestseller, and was selected in 2002 as a Target Book Club Pick.

Moody’s second novel, The Office of Desire, appeared in 2007. Publishers Weekly described the book as a “sharply observed tale of office relationships gone very wrong at a small Ohio medical practice.” Kirkus Reviews—in a starred review—called Moody “a genuinely original voice,” and the book “a bracingly dark comedy… a provocative, intensely moving novel of ideas and opposing philosophies presented by deeply flawed, deeply human characters,” and later named it one of the Best Books of ’07.

Moody’s most recent novel, Sometimes Mine, was published in 2009, and follows a workaholic cardiologist’s decade-long, one night a week affair with a well-known basketball coach.

In a June, 2010 interview with author interview website Words to Mouth, Moody said that she was “working on a manuscript that deals with two families joined by marriage… I want to explore how families connected by marriage interact and influence each other."

On April 15, 2011, Gawker’s science and technology blog io9 reported that Moody had just sold a new novel, Sharp and Dangerous Virtues, to Ohio University Press. Io9 reports that the book is a “dystopian-sounding novel” about Dayton, Ohio in the 2040s, wracked by “food shortages, foreign invaders and ordinary people having to fend for themselves.”

Moody has also edited the English translations of numerous volumes of Arabic short stories and poetry by Palestinian writers—all edited and translated by Jamal Assadi—including the collections: A Rose to Hafeeza’s Eyes (Peter Lang, 2008), Three Voices from the Galilee (Peter Lang, 2009), Mustafa Murrar: The Internal Pages and Other Stories (Peter Lang, 2010), and Loud Sounds from the Holy Land (Peter Lang, 2011).
