= Sarah Cowles Little =

American educator

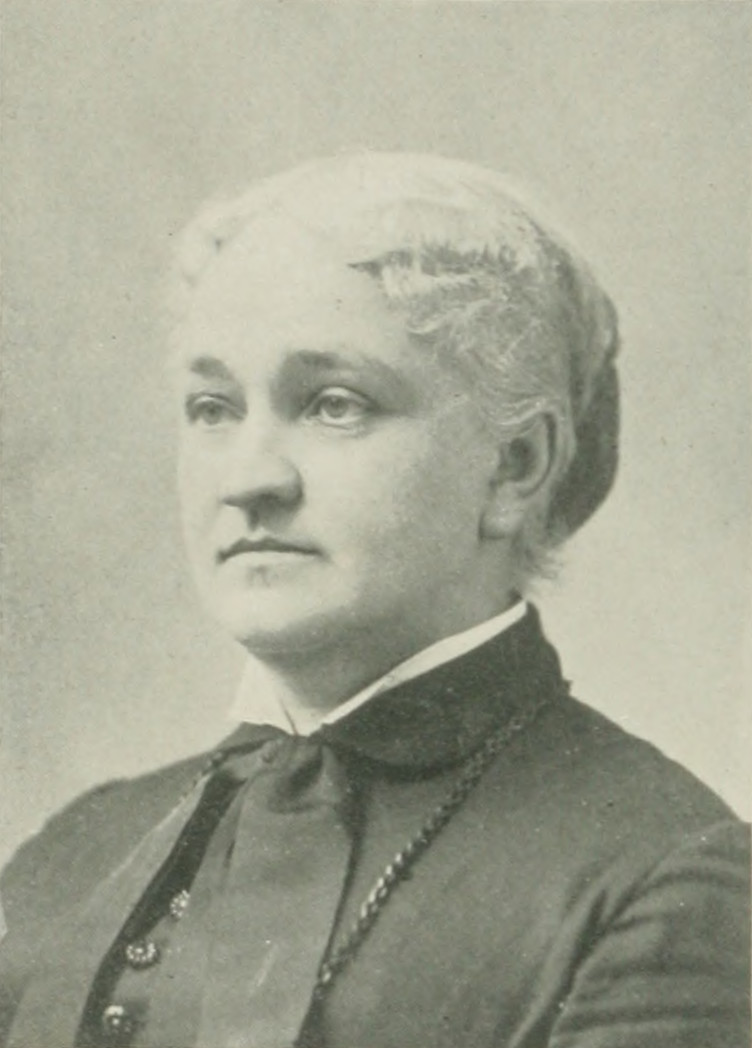
Sarah F. Cowles Little

Sarah F. Cowles Little (March 6, 1838 – January 16, 1912) was an American educator from the U.S. state of Ohio. She served as Superintendent of the Wisconsin School for the Blind and Visually Impaired in Janesville, Wisconsin.

== Early years and education ==
Sarah Cowles Little was born in Oberlin, Ohio, March 6, 1838. Her father was Rev. Henry Cowles, D. D., a professor in Oberlin Theological Seminary, and an eminent scholar, author and divine. He was born in Litchfield County, Connecticut, and was descended from an old New England family of English origin. Her mother, Alice Welch (died Oberlin, October, 1848), was for several years the principal of the "ladies' department" of Oberlin College. She was the daughter of Dr. Benjamin Welch, of Norfolk, Connecticut. Her five brothers were physicians, widely known throughout western New England. One of the brothers, Benjamin, was a noted surgeon who devised surgical appliances. Little was the second daughter and fourth child in the family. One of her sisters was Mary Louisa Cowles (1839-1859).

As her home was in proximity of Oberlin College, her opportunities for education were readily available. She was graduated in the classical course in 1859, with the degree of B. A., followed by that of M. A. within a few years. Little commenced teaching at the age of 15 years in a district school near her home. She taught during several college vacations, and was also employed as a teacher in the preparatory department of Oberlin College during the later years of her education.

== Career ==
After graduation, Little taught for two years in the public schools of Columbus, Ohio, and in the fall of 1861, went to Janesville, Wisconsin, to serve as principal teacher in the Wisconsin School for the Blind and Visually Impaired, of which Thomas H. Little was the superintendent. They married on July 14, 1862. Little continued to teach regularly for a time after her marriage, and at intervals thereafter. In her husband's absence or illness, his duties were delegated to her.

Her husband died on February 4, 1875, and Little was at chosen by the board of trustees as his successor. One of her challenges concerned the main building of the institution, which had been destroyed by fire in 1874. To the difficulty of carrying on the school work in small and inconvenient quarters was added the supervision of the erection of the enlarged new building. During the time of her superintendency, the Wisconsin School for the Blind was one of the best managed institutions of the kind in the country, and she was recognized as a leader in educational circles. She continued at the head of the school until August 1891, leaving it at the close of 30 years of active service, more than 16 of them as superintendent.

Besides her interest in education, Little took an active part in Christian work of various types. She was for years a successful teacher of a large Bible class for adults. One of her own four daughters was doing missionary work, and thus Little developed a deep interest in the Oberlin Home for Missionary Children, from the very beginning of the plans for its establishment, and at the opening, in 1892, she headed it.

She died at her home in Oberlin on January 16, 1912.
