= Dost Öngür =

Turkish-American psychiatrist

Dost Öngür is a Turkish-American psychiatrist and researcher born in Istanbul, Turkey. He is Chief of the Psychotic Disorders Division at McLean Hospital, and the William P. and Henry B. Test Professor of Psychiatry at Harvard Medical School.

He serves as Editor in Chief of JAMA Psychiatry, a leading journal in the field, and on the NARSAD/Brain & Behavior Research Foundation Scientific Council. He is currently President-elect of the Society of Biological Psychiatry. His work focuses on recognizing brain abnormalities in people with psychotic disorders and developing novel treatments to address these abnormalities, particularly through the use of brain imaging. He is the author of more than 300 articles on bipolar disorder, schizophrenia, and related conditions. As of July 2025, his work has been cited over 26,000 times.

He has featured on numerous public media programs, such as ABC News, USA Today, Time, a WBUR special, as well on Oprah's Book Club 2.0, discussing Schizophrenia in 2020.

== Education ==
- 1989 High School Diploma, Robert College of Istanbul
- 1992 BA in Biochemistry, Oberlin College
- 1994 MSc in Neuroscience, Yale University
- 2000 M.D./Ph.D. in Medicine/Neurobiology, Washington University in St. Louis

== Honors and awards ==
- Alfred Pope Award for research, McLean Hospital, 2008
- Harvard Medical School Young Mentoring award, 2010
- Harry Stack Sullivan award, Sheppard and Enoch Pratt Hospital, 2018
- Kempf Award, American Psychiatric Association, 2019
- Hamilton Award, American Psychopathological Association, 2023
- Stuart T. Hauser Mentorship Award, Harvard Medical School Department of Psychiatry, 2023
- Alexander Gralnick Award, American Psychiatric Association, 2024
