= Louisa Lydia Alexander =

American educator

Louisa Lydia Alexander (November 2, 1836 - August 18, 1911) was an American educator and one of the first African American women to attend Oberlin College. Oberlin was the first American institution to admit female students, and one of the first to admit black students.

== Biography ==
Alexander was born at Mays Lick, Kentucky on November 2, 1836, to Henry Alexander (b. 1802) and Lucy Alexander (b. 1803). Henry was born into slavery, but successfully purchased his freedom when he was 21 years old. He became a merchant and was listed in the 1840 U.S. Federal Census as a free man. At some point, Henry may have purchased his wife's freedom. Lucy Alexander was listed in the 1850 U.S. Federal Census as a free woman. The couple had five daughters: Louisa Lydia; Lucy; Lemira (attended Oberlin 1853–1854); Rachel (attended Oberlin 1862–1864); and Maria Ann (1826–1905) (educator, attended Oberlin 1852–1854, married to Mifflin Wistar Gibbs, an African-American attorney, judge, diplomat and banker).

Alexander entered Oberlin College in 1850. Oberlin was one of the first institutions of higher education to admit women, as well as one of the first to admit Black students. After six years of study, Alexander completed requirements for the Ladies Teaching course. After graduation, she taught school in several Southern towns including: Charleston, South Carolina; Marietta, Georgia; Henderson, Kentucky; Cumberland, Mississippi; Red Banks, Mississippi; Mays Lick, Kentucky; St. Mark, Alabama; and Giles Plantation, Mississippi.

Alexander died in Washington, DC, on August 18, 1911, and was buried in Oberlin Westwood Cemetery.
