= Elizabeth Watson Russell Lord =

American educator and philanthropist

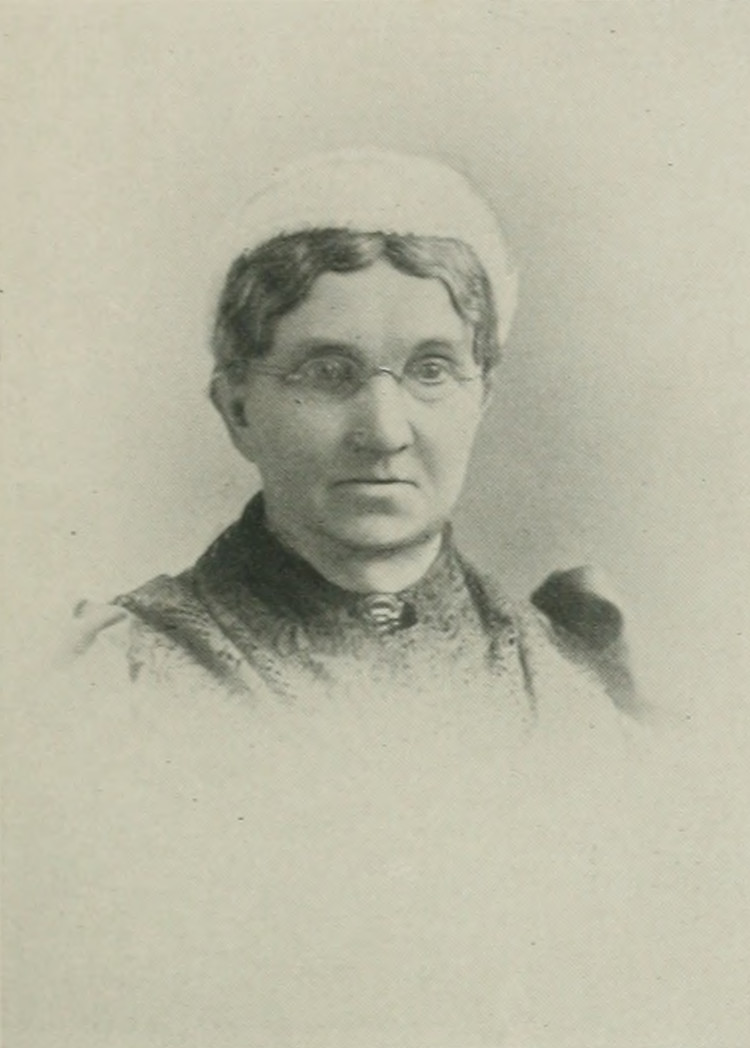
Portrait photo from A Woman of the Century

Elizabeth Watson Russell Lord (April 28, 1819 – May 24, 1908) was an American educator and philanthropist from the U.S. state of Ohio. For two years, she was superintendent of the state institution for the blind at Batavia. She received her master's degree from Oberlin College in 1901; and served there as Assistant Principal, Women's Department, 1884–94, as well as Assistant Dean, Women's Department, 1894–1900. She was the Chief Donor of the school's Lord Cottage.

== Early life and education ==
Elizabeth Watson Russell was born in Kirtland, Ohio on April 28, 1819. She was the oldest child of Alpheus C. and Elizabeth Conant Russell. Her parents, natives of Massachusetts, were among the early settlers of the Western Reserve. Both had been teachers in New England, and the father continued for some years to teach school in the winters, carrying on his farm at the same time.

After some terms in the district school, Lord was for several years a pupil of Rev. Truman Coe, pastor of the Congregational church in Kirtland. In the spring of 1838, the father sent Lord to Oberlin College. About that time, the Western Reserve Teachers' Seminary was established in Kirtland, with her father as one of its board of trustees. During the succeeding years, Lord divided her time between that seminary and Oberlin College, until 21 July 1842, when in Oberlin she married Dr. Asa D. Lord, M.D., and with him returned to Kirtland to share his work as teacher in the seminary.

== Career ==
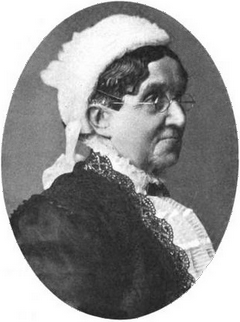
E. W. R. Lord

In 1847, Dr. Lord was induced to go to Columbus, Ohio, there to establish a system of graded schools, the first of the kind in the State. When the high school was opened, a little later, Mrs. Lord was its first principal. In the summer of 1856, Dr. Lord assumed charge of the Ohio Institution for the Education of the Blind, remaining there until 1868, when he went to Batavia, New York, to organize the new State Institution for the Blind. During the 19 years, Dr. Lord was superintendent of the institutions for the blind in Ohio and New York, Mrs. Lord assisted as a teacher of the blind. She has probably taught more blind persons to read than any other one teacher in this country, and probably more than any other in the world.

In March 1875, after a very brief illness, Dr. Lord died, and the board of trustees unanimously elected Mrs. Lord to succeed her husband as superintendent in the institution. Mrs. Lord performed the duties of that important office until the fall of 1877 when she no longer deemed it best to act as superintendent. Her resignation was reluctantly accepted, on condition that she remain in the institution. After a few months spent in the home of her only child, Mrs. Henry Fisk Tarbox, of Batavia, Mrs. Lord returned to the institution and spent five more years there. She also served as assistant principal of the woman's department of Oberlin College. She entered upon the duties of that office, which she now holds, in the summer of 1884. She donated to charitable and educational institutions. Her largest gift was that of US$10,000 to Oberlin College in 1890, which, with additions from other sources, built "Lord Cottage" for the accommodation of young women.

She died May 24, 1908, aged 89 years.
