= Oberlin, Ohio =

City in Lorain County, Ohio, US

- City
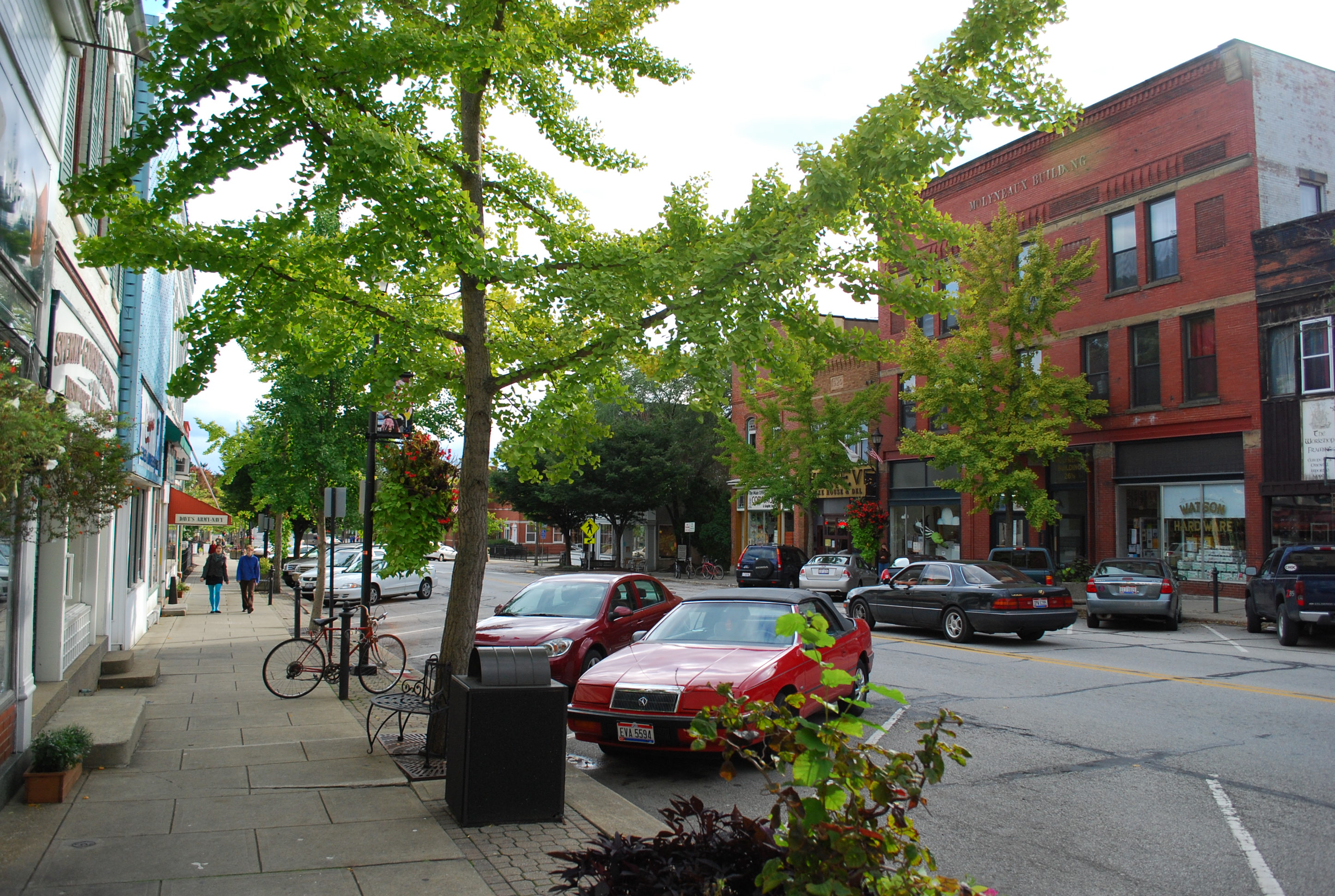
- Downtown Oberlin
- Motto: "Live. Learn. Lead."
- Interactive map of Oberlin, Ohio
- Location within Ohio Location within the United States
- Coordinates: 41°17′00″N 82°14′00″W
- Country: United States
- State: Ohio
- County: Lorain
- Founded: 1833
- Named for: J. F. Oberlin

Government
  - Type: Council–manager

Area
  - Total: 4.96 sq mi (12.85 km^{2})
  - Land: 4.92 sq mi (12.75 km^{2})
  - Water: 0.039 sq mi (0.10 km^{2})
- Elevation: 807 ft (246 m)

Population (2020)
  - Total: 8,555
  - Density: 1,737.2/sq mi (670.75/km^{2})
- Time zone: UTC-5 (Eastern (EST))
  - Summer (DST): UTC-4 (EDT)
- ZIP code: 44074
- Area code: 440
- FIPS code: 39-57834
- GNIS feature ID: 2395295
- Website: www.cityofoberlin.com

Oberlin (/ˈoʊbərlɪn/) is a city in Lorain County, Ohio, United States. It is located about 31 miles (50 km) southwest of Cleveland within the Cleveland metropolitan area. The population was 8,555 at the 2020 census. Oberlin is the home of Oberlin College, a liberal arts college and music conservatory with approximately 3,000 students.

The town is the birthplace of the Anti-Saloon League and the Hall–Héroult process, the process of reducing aluminum from its fluoride salts by electrolysis, which made industrial production of aluminum possible.

== History ==
Oberlin was founded in 1833 by two Presbyterian ministers, John Jay Shipherd and Philo P. Stewart. The pair had become friends while spending the summer of 1832 together in nearby Elyria and discovered a shared dissatisfaction with what they saw as the lack of strong Christian morals among the settlers of the American West. Their proposed solution was to create a religious community that would more closely adhere to Biblical commandments, along with a school for training Christian missionaries who would eventually spread throughout the American frontier. The two decided to name their community after J. F. Oberlin (1740–1826), an Alsatian minister whose pedagogical achievements in a poor and remote area had greatly impressed and inspired them.

Shipherd and Stewart rode south from Elyria into the forests that then covered the northern part of Ohio in search of a suitable location for their community. After a journey of approximately eight miles, they stopped to rest and pray in the shade of an elm tree along the forest, and agreed that this would be a good place to start their community.

Shipherd traveled back east and convinced the owner of the land to donate 500 acres (2.0 km^{2}) of land for the school, and he purchased an additional 5,000 acres (20 km^{2}) for the town, at the cost of $1.50 per acre ($371/km^{2}).

In 1834 a charter for the new Oberlin Collegiate Institute was obtained from the legislature of Ohio, and the institute adopted as its motto "Learning and Labor." The same year saw a freshman class of four students. In those days the words were taken quite literally: tuition at Oberlin was free, but students were expected to contribute by helping to build and sustain the community. This attracted a number of bright young people who would otherwise not have been able to afford tuition. The motto remains to this day.

During the mid-1800s African Americans, predominantly free people of color and runaway slaves, settled in the area.

In Oberlin's earliest years, transportation (especially for students) depended heavily on weather-dependent Lake Erie transportation routes; the nearest railroad passed through Wellington, and travellers were forced to rely on stagecoaches between that village and Oberlin. This situation changed in 1852 when the Toledo, Norwalk, and Cleveland Railroad opened a stop in Oberlin along its Grafton line. Fifteen years later, the Lake Shore and Michigan Southern Railway opened a new rail station along this line; no longer used for rail transportation, the depot has been converted for community use and sits at the center of a park.

On June 28, 1924, the worst flood in Oberlin history occurred on the same day that a tornado killed 62 people in Lorain. Afterward, the water was so deep that children swam in Tappan Square. Damage was caused to all of downtown Oberlin.

One of Oberlin's largest employers was the Federal Aviation Administration, which houses the Cleveland Air Route Traffic Control Center overseeing the airspace of six states and a small part of Canada.

=== Abolitionism ===
Oberlin was not founded as an abolitionist town. Its status changed with the enrollment in 1835 of the Lane Rebels, a loose group of several dozen students coordinated by abolitionist Theodore Weld. They had withdrawn en masse from the new Lane Theological Seminary of Cincinnati because of its treatment of the Black community and opposition to abolition of slavery. Cincinnati, on the Ohio River, was not a city where free blacks were safe, nor did Cincinnati welcome fugitives.

By chance, this group encountered Shipherd, who was travelling around Ohio looking for students for his new Collegiate Institute. The group agreed to come to Oberlin, but on condition that Asa Mahan, who had resigned as a Lane trustee, come as president, and that Oberlin treat Black and white students equally, something no college in the United States did at the time. The trustees, although reluctantly, agreed to these conditions. The first Black enrolees, James Bradley and the brothers Gideon Quarles and Charles Henry Langston, did not enroll in Oberlin but in an affiliated school, the Sheffield Manual Labor Institute. (Their younger brother John Mercer Langston, who in 1888 became the first black elected to the United States Congress from Virginia, also studied at Oberlin.)

By the middle of the 19th century, Oberlin had become a major focus of the abolitionist movement in the United States. Escaped enslaved people were relatively safe there. Thousands of escaped enslaved people crossing the Ohio River from Kentucky came through Oberlin—some to stay in the area, but most as a way-station to recover on their way to Lake Erie, where they found transportation across the lake to the safety of Canada West (Ontario).

The town of Oberlin, then, was an active "station" on the Underground Railroad. Fugitive enslaved people were assisted by a new Ohio law that allowed them to apply for a writ of habeas corpus, which protected them from extradition back to the Southern states from which they had escaped. In 1858, a newly elected Democratic state legislature repealed this law, making fugitives around Oberlin vulnerable to enforcement of the Federal Fugitive Slave Law, which allowed Southern slave-catchers to target and extradite them back to the South.

This situation came to a head with the Oberlin-Wellington Rescue, a pivotal event described in Nat Brandt's book The Town That Started the Civil War. On September 13, 1858, a fugitive named John Price was captured by federal officials and held in neighboring Wellington, Ohio. A large group of Oberlin residents, consisting of both white and black townspeople, students, and faculty, set out for Wellington to release Price from captivity.

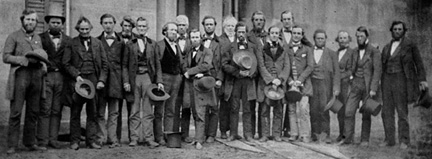
Oberlin "Rescuers" outside the Cuyahoga County jail. C.H. Langston is seventh from right in front row, with hat over his chest.

The men took Price back from the arresting US Marshal, and eventually smuggled him to Canada, but the authorities were not content to let the matter rest. United States President James Buchanan personally requested prosecution of the group (now referred to by sympathetic parties as "the Rescuers"), and 37 of them were indicted. Twelve of those were formerly enslaved people, including Charles H. Langston. State authorities arrested the US Marshal who had captured Price. In negotiation, the state agreed to free the arresters, and the federal officials agreed to free all but two of those indicted. Simeon M. Bushnell, a white man, and Charles H. Langston were both tried and convicted by an all-Democrat jury. Langston's eloquent speech against slavery and injustice persuaded the judge to give them light sentences, with Langston receiving 20 days in jail and a fine of $100. They appealed to the Ohio Supreme Court for a writ of habeas corpus, but on May 30, 1859, their petition was denied.

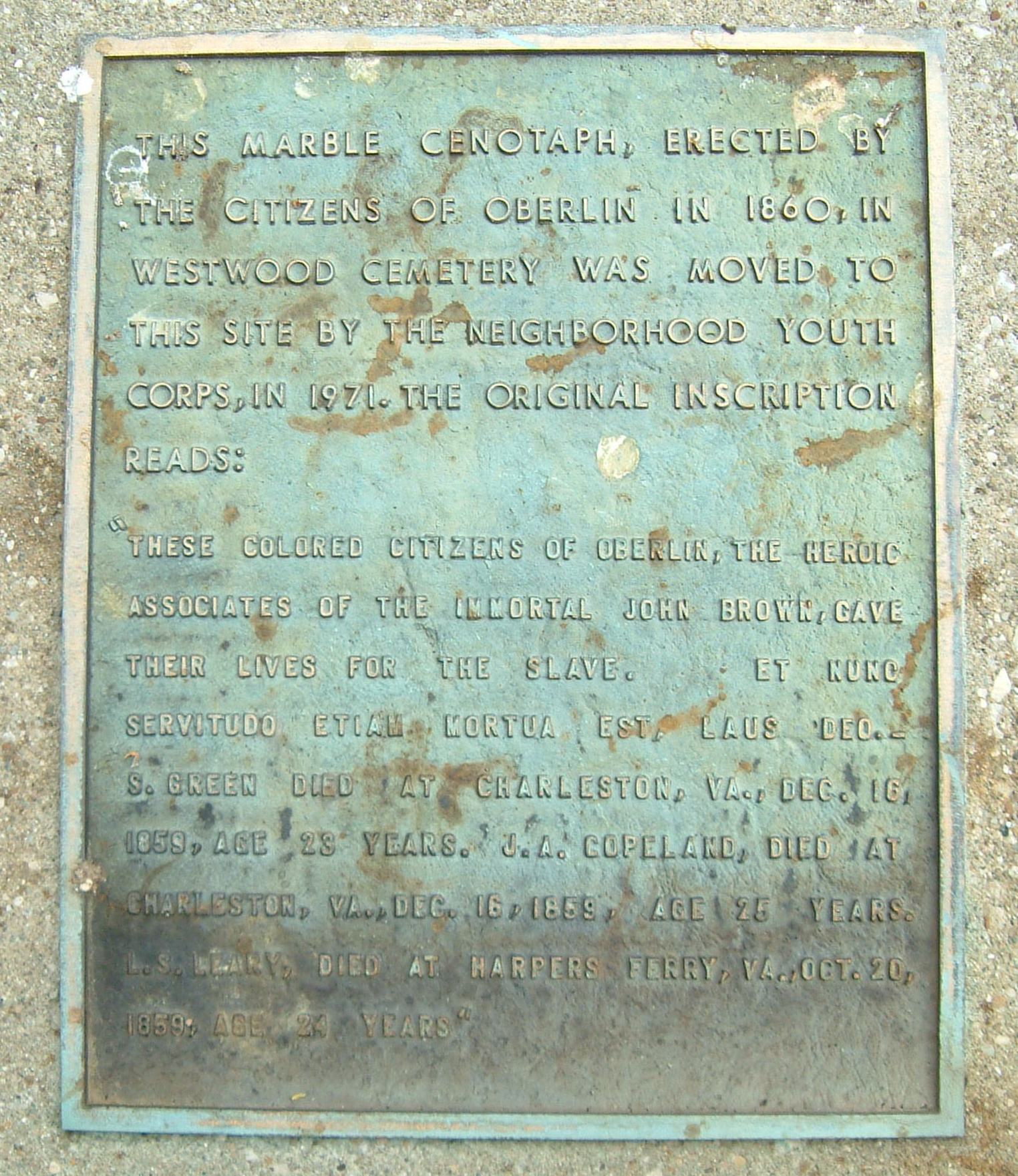
Cenotaph in Oberlin with names of Green, Copeland, and Leary, erected 1860: "These colored citizens of Oberlin, the heroic associates of the immortal John Brown, gave their lives for the slave."

Three formerly enslaved people—Lewis Sheridan Leary, Shields Green, and John Anthony Copeland, Jr.—participated in John Brown's famous 1859 raid on Harpers Ferry. Leary died during the raid, and Green and Copeland were hanged after arrest and conviction. The bodies of Green and Copeland were used for dissection and anatomical study at the Winchester Medical College; the remains were discarded. Leary's body was first thrown in an unmarked pit, along with the 7 of the 9 others killed during the raid; much later the bodies were disinterred and reburied at the John Brown Farm, next to his grave. (See John Brown's raiders.)

The political ferment resulting from the Oberlin-Wellington Rescue led to a number of major protests throughout the northern part of Ohio, and an unprecedented boost to the anti-slavery Republican party in the 1860 state elections. The governor of Ohio wrote to the new Republican President Abraham Lincoln urging him to repeal the Fugitive Slave Law. Though in point of fact Lincoln declined this request, this decision did not prevent Southern states from seceding, and America was soon embroiled in the Civil War.

== Geography ==
According to the United States Census Bureau, the city has a total area of 5.11 square miles (13.23 km^{2}), of which, 5.07 square miles (13.13 km^{2}) is land and 0.04 square miles (0.10 km^{2}) is water.

=== Climate ===
Oberlin experiences a humid continental (Köppen Dfa) climate. Winters are cold, dry and often snowy (up to 26 cm (10 in)). Summers are warm to very warm and sometimes hot (up to 27 °C). The city rests within the northern snowbelt of Ohio and is tempered by the Great Lakes.

Climate data for Oberlin, Ohio
| Month | Jan | Feb | Mar | Apr | May | Jun | Jul | Aug | Sep | Oct | Nov | Dec | Year |
|---|---|---|---|---|---|---|---|---|---|---|---|---|---|
| Record high °F (°C) | 74 (23) | 76 (24) | 83 (28) | 89 (32) | 93 (34) | 104 (40) | 102 (39) | 100 (38) | 100 (38) | 92 (33) | 80 (27) | 77 (25) | 104 (40) |
| Mean daily maximum °F (°C) | 32.0 (0.0) | 35.7 (2.1) | 45.8 (7.7) | 58.0 (14.4) | 69.7 (20.9) | 78.6 (25.9) | 82.7 (28.2) | 80.8 (27.1) | 74.2 (23.4) | 62.6 (17.0) | 49.1 (9.5) | 37.1 (2.8) | 58.9 (14.9) |
| Mean daily minimum °F (°C) | 15.6 (−9.1) | 18.1 (−7.7) | 26.7 (−2.9) | 36.2 (2.3) | 46.9 (8.3) | 56.1 (13.4) | 60.3 (15.7) | 58.2 (14.6) | 50.9 (10.5) | 40.1 (4.5) | 31.9 (−0.1) | 21.7 (−5.7) | 38.6 (3.7) |
| Record low °F (°C) | −23 (−31) | −18 (−28) | −15 (−26) | 6 (−14) | 19 (−7) | 30 (−1) | 38 (3) | 32 (0) | 25 (−4) | 16 (−9) | 2 (−17) | −18 (−28) | −23 (−31) |
| Average precipitation inches (mm) | 2.25 (57) | 2.02 (51) | 2.65 (67) | 3.22 (82) | 3.60 (91) | 3.85 (98) | 3.75 (95) | 3.49 (89) | 3.25 (83) | 2.37 (60) | 3.05 (77) | 2.73 (69) | 36.23 (920) |
| Average snowfall inches (cm) | 10.1 (26) | 9.4 (24) | 7.0 (18) | 1.5 (3.8) | 0 (0) | 0 (0) | 0 (0) | 0 (0) | 0 (0) | 0 (0) | 2.6 (6.6) | 8.6 (22) | 39.2 (100) |
| Average precipitation days (≥ 0.01 in) | 12.3 | 10.1 | 11.6 | 12.6 | 11.8 | 11.0 | 9.5 | 9.6 | 9.7 | 10.3 | 11.7 | 12.8 | 133 |
| Average snowy days (≥ 0.1 in) | 6.0 | 4.8 | 3.1 | 0.8 | 0 | 0 | 0 | 0 | 0 | 0 | 1.6 | 5 | 21.3 |
Source: NOAA (normals, 1971–2000)

== Demographics ==
Historical population
| Census | Pop. | Note | %± |
|---|---|---|---|
| 1860 | 2,115 | | — |
| 1870 | 2,888 | | 36.5% |
| 1880 | 3,242 | | 12.3% |
| 1890 | 4,376 | | 35.0% |
| 1900 | 4,082 | | −6.7% |
| 1910 | 4,365 | | 6.9% |
| 1920 | 4,286 | | −1.8% |
| 1930 | 4,292 | | 0.1% |
| 1940 | 4,305 | | 0.3% |
| 1950 | 7,062 | | 64.0% |
| 1960 | 8,198 | | 16.1% |
| 1970 | 8,761 | | 6.9% |
| 1980 | 8,660 | | −1.2% |
| 1990 | 8,191 | | −5.4% |
| 2000 | 8,195 | | 0.0% |
| 2010 | 8,286 | | 1.1% |
| 2020 | 8,555 | | 3.2% |
| 2025 (est.) | 8,603 | | 0.6% |

=== 2020 census ===
As of the 2020 census, Oberlin had a population of 8,555. The median age was 28.0 years. 12.3% of residents were under the age of 18 and 22.4% of residents were 65 years of age or older.

For every 100 females there were 79.9 males, and for every 100 females age 18 and over there were 75.7 males age 18 and over.

95.1% of residents lived in urban areas, while 4.9% lived in rural areas.

There were 2,654 households in Oberlin, of which 20.8% had children under the age of 18 living in them. Of all households, 36.8% were married-couple households, 21.1% were households with a male householder and no spouse or partner present, and 36.2% were households with a female householder and no spouse or partner present. About 39.4% of all households were made up of individuals and 18.4% had someone living alone who was 65 years of age or older.

There were 3,031 housing units, of which 12.4% were vacant. The homeowner vacancy rate was 1.4% and the rental vacancy rate was 13.5%.

Racial composition as of the 2020 census
| Race | Number | Percent |
|---|---|---|
| White | 6,368 | 74.4% |
| Black or African American | 1,067 | 12.5% |
| American Indian and Alaska Native | 23 | 0.3% |
| Asian | 212 | 2.5% |
| Native Hawaiian and Other Pacific Islander | 1 | 0.0% |
| Some other race | 224 | 2.6% |
| Two or more races | 660 | 7.7% |
| Hispanic or Latino (of any race) | 449 | 5.2% |

=== 2010 census ===
As of the census of 2010, there were 8,286 people, 2,730 households, and 1,381 families residing in the city. The population density was 1,684.1 inhabitants per square mile (650.2/km^{2}). There were 2,984 housing units at an average density of 606.5 per square mile (234.2/km^{2}). The racial makeup of the city was 73.0% White, 14.8% African American, 0.2% Native American, 4.0% Asian, 1.4% from other races, and 6.5% from two or more races. Hispanic or Latino of any race were 5.1% of the population.

There were 2,730 households, of which 24.0% had children under the age of 18 living with them, 35.9% were married couples living together, 11.2% had a female householder with no husband present, 3.4% had a male householder with no wife present, and 49.4% were non-families. 38.3% of all households were made up of individuals, and 16.8% had someone living alone who was 65 years of age or older. The average household size was 2.19 and the average family size was 2.86.

The median age in the city was 23.3 years. 14.8% of residents were under the age of 18; 37.4% were between the ages of 18 and 24; 14.5% were from 25 to 44; 18.5% were from 45 to 64; and 14.7% were 65 years of age or older. The gender makeup of the city was 46.0% male and 54.0% female.

Of the city's population over the age of 25, 41.1% hold a bachelor's degree or higher.

=== 2000 census ===
As of the census of 2000, there were 8,195 people, 2,678 households, and 1,395 families residing in the city. The population density was 1,871.5 inhabitants per square mile (722.6/km^{2}). There were 2,836 housing units at an average density of 647.7 per square mile (250.1/km^{2}). The racial makeup of the city was 71.92% White, 18.55% African American, 0.49% Native American, 3.40% Asian, 0.17% Pacific Islander, 1.21% from other races, and 4.26% from two or more races. Hispanic or Latino of any race were 3.04% of the population.

There were 2,678 households, out of which 21.4% had children under the age of 18 living with them, 38.5% were married couples living together, 11.5% had a female householder with no husband present, and 47.9% were non-families. 35.7% of all households were made up of individuals, and 16.6% had someone living alone who was 65 years of age or older. The average household size was 2.31 and the average family size was 2.89.

In the city the population was spread out, with 14.7% under the age of 18, 36.9% from 18 to 24, 16.4% from 25 to 44, 17.0% from 45 to 64, and 15.0% who were 65 years of age or older. The median age was 24 years. For every 100 females, there were 77.7 males. For every 100 females age 18 and over, there were 73.2 males.

The median income for a household in the city was $41,094, and the median income for a family was $59,358. Males had a median income of $42,170 versus $27,308 for females. The per capita income for the city was $20,704. About 6.7% of families and 19.4% of the population were below the poverty line, including 11.6% of those under age 18 and 7.5% of those age 65 or over.

== Government ==
The City of Oberlin's motto is "live, learn, lead." It is governed by a city manager and a seven-member council which is elected to two-year terms in a non-partisan election.

The city of Oberlin runs an online dashboard that displays the city's use of resources in real time. Effective from July 2013, the dashboard shows outputs of infrastructure, such as Oberlin's power plant and water treatment plant.

== Transportation ==
Oberlin lies at the intersection of state routes 58 and 511. Its municipal limits extend south to include parts of U.S. Highway 20. Oberlin also lies on a paved bicycle and pedestrian path, the North Coast Inland Trail, which travels southwest to Kipton and northeast to Elyria. The path is built on the former railroad right-of-way of the Lake Shore and Michigan Southern Railway Southern Branch. Like many smaller municipalities across Ohio, Oberlin was once served by railroads but currently has no railroad service. An old station is visible along the bike path.

The Cleveland & Southwestern interurban line from Elyria served Oberlin from approximately 1903 to its demise in 1928. Its rails basically followed Oberlin/Elyria Rd / Rt 231 from the east, entering town on E. College St, then turned South and followed Rt 58 to Wellington. There was a wye at S. Main and the line continued west to Norwalk, competing with the Lake Shore Electric into the city.

Lorain County Transit (LCT) formerly offered two bus routes in Oberlin, which operated on the 33 and 21 state routes. The 33 route was an express route between Elyria and Cleveland Hopkins Airport, while the 21 route operated with limited service between Elyria and Wellington. The routes were shut down due to funding shortfalls. LCT currently operates a door-to-door "Oberlin Connector" bus service, with trips required to begin or end in within Oberlin. Since 2024, Oberlin is served by the EBus, a fare-free public transit bus route operating under contract by Transdev and support from LCT using electric vehicles making several stops across the city on a loop.

== Notable people ==
- Frederic de Forest Allen, (1844–1897), born in Oberlin, classical scholar
- Sweet Pea Atkinson (1945-2020), Singer Was (Not Was)
- Roger Bacon (1926-2007), inventor of graphite fiber
- Antoinette Brown Blackwell, suffragist, women's rights activist, Protestant minister
- John Anthony Copeland, Jr. (1834–1859), Black, executed by hanging after participating in John Brown's raid on Harpers Ferry
- Aaron Dilloway, (1976-), experimental musician, owner of Hanson Records
- Linda Eastman, librarian
- Charles Grandison Finney, (1792–1875), minister, professor and president of the Oberlin College (1851–1866)
- Shields Green (1836?–1859), Black, killed during John Brown's raid on Harpers Ferry
- Charles Martin Hall, (1863−1914), lived in Oberlin 1873–1914, co-discoverer of Hall-Héroult process, founder of Alcoa
- Oszkár Jászi, Hungarian social scientist, historian, and politician
- Isaac Jennings (1788–1874), medical reformer and mayor of Oberlin, orthopath.
- Albert Mussey Johnson, (1872−1948), born in Oberlin, eccentric multi-millionaire industrialist
- Charles Henry Langston (1817–1892), one of two tried and convicted after Oberlin-Wellington Rescue, abolitionist and political activist in Ohio and Kansas.
- John Mercer Langston (1829–1899), abolitionist, activist, educator and politician
- Lewis Sheridan Leary (1835–1859), Black, killed during John Brown's raid on Harpers Ferry.
- David Lewis (1941–2001), philosopher
- Sarah Cowles Little, educator
- John Miller, American football player
- Jason Molina (1973-2013), born in Oberlin, musician and singer-songwriter
- Jason Moore, born in Oberlin, football player for the Los Angeles Chargers
- Anne Eugenia Felicia Morgan (1845-1909), professor, philosopher, writer, and game inventor
- Toni Morrison, novelist and professor emeritus at Princeton University
- Nettie Langston Napier, advocate for African-American women's rights
- Dwight Peabody, American football player
- Dirk Powell, traditional musician
- Linda Pritzker, member of the Pritzker family
- Dan Ramos, Ohio state legislator
- Julia Gridley Severance (1877–1972), artist, sculptor, puppeteer
- Lucy Stone, suffragist, activist, women's rights advocate
- Cliff Stoudt, quarterback with the Pittsburgh Steelers from 1977 to 1983
- Mary Burnett Talbert, orator, activist, suffragist and reformer
- Hugh Thornton, professional football player
- Charles Henry Tyler Townsend, entomologist and biologist
- Don Treadwell, football coach
- Frankie E. Harris Wassom, educator and poet
- Dale Willman, journalist
- Matt Wilhelm, born in Oberlin, professional football player
- Steve Gibson of Signals Midwest, musician

== Sister cities ==
Oberlin's sister cities are:

- Ifẹ, Nigeria

== See also ==
- Oberlin High School
- Oberlin Heritage Center
- Apollo Theater (Oberlin, Ohio)
- Oberlin College

== Bibliography ==
- Burroughs, Wilbur Greeley (1886–1974): Oberlin's Part in the Slavery Conflict, Ohio Archæological and Historical Society Publications: Volume 20 [1911], pp. 269–334.
