= Fairchild (name) =

Other names
- Variant form: Fairbairn

Fairchild is a common surname derived from the Old English words for fair or beautiful and the word child. Originally a given name, early records of its use as a surname are found in Oxfordshire, Surrey and Sussex.

== List of persons with the surname ==
- Fairchild family, descendants of Thomas Fairchild (1610–1670), son of William Fairchild (b.1577 in Essex England)

=== A ===
- Alexa Fairchild (born 1994), Belgian equestrian athlete
- Amy Fairchild, American historian

=== B ===
- Barbara Fairchild, American country and gospel singer/songwriter
- Benjamin L. Fairchild (1863–1946), New York State Republican congressman

=== C ===
- Cassius Fairchild (1829–1868), Wisconsin Democratic Party Leader and Union Army colonel, U.S. Civil War
- Charles S. Fairchild (1842–1924), New York State Attorney General, 38th United States Secretary of Treasury

=== D ===
- David Fairchild (1869–1954), industrial botanist, plant explorer, son-in-law of Alexander Graham Bell
- David Fairchild (California politician) (1791–1866)
- Dylan Fairchild (born 2003), American football player

=== E ===
- Edward Henry Fairchild (1815–1889), abolishionist educator, first President of Berea College
- Edward T. Fairchild (Wisconsin associate justice) (1872–1965), jurist, Wisconsin Supreme Court
- Edward Thomson Fairchild (1854–1917), New Hampshire College of Agriculture and Mechanical Arts (U. of New Hampshire) president
- Edwin C. Fairchild (1874–1955), British socialist activist

=== F ===
- Frank Fairchild Wesbrook (1868–1918), first University of British Columbia president
- Fred Rogers Fairchild (1877–1966), American educator and economist

=== G ===
- George Thompson Fairchild (1838–1901), college educator, president of Michigan State University and Kansas State University
- George Winthrop Fairchild (1854–1924), American politician, and co-founder of IBM
- Graham Fairchild (1906–1994), entomologist, grandson of Alexander Graham Bell

=== H ===
- Henry Pratt Fairchild (1880–1956), American sociologist, co-founder of Planned Parenthood
- Herman LeRoy Fairchild (1850–1943), American geologist and college educator, early proponent of theorizing meteorite impact
- Hiram Orlando Fairchild (1845–1925), speaker of the Wisconsin State Assembly

=== J ===
- James Fairchild (1817–1902), president of Oberlin College
- Jim Fairchild American singer/songwriter guitarist, Band member of Modest Mouse
- Jairus C. Fairchild (1801–1862), first Wisconsin State Treasurer, and first mayor of Madison, Wisconsin
- John Fairchild, American basketball player

=== K ===
- Karen Fairchild, singer in American Country band, Little Big Town
- Kelly Fairchild, American ice hockey player

=== L ===
- LeRoy Fairchild, founded the Masonic order, the Mystic Order of Veiled Prophets of the Enchanted Realm in 1889
- Lucius Fairchild (1831–1896), Civil War Brigadier General, three-term Governor of Wisconsin, U.S. Minister to Spain, Commander-in-Chief of the Grand Army of the Republic
- Lydia Fairchild, one of only 30 known worldwide cases of chimerism

=== M ===
- Megan Fairchild, American ballet dancer
- Morgan Fairchild, American actress
- Muir S. Fairchild (1894–1950), Four-star General, Vice Chief of Staff of the United States Air Force

=== R ===
- Robert Fairchild, American ballet dancer

=== S ===
- Sherman Fairchild (1896–1971), industrialist inventor, founder of Fairchild Aviation, Fairchild-Strato, Fairchild-Hiller, Fairchild Recording, and Fairchild Camera and Instrument
- Stuart Fairchild (born 1996), American baseball player

=== T ===
- Thomas E. Fairchild (1912–2007), Wisconsin Attorney General, appointed to Wisconsin Supreme Court and U.S. 7th Circuit Court of Appeals
