= Fairchild family =

North American family

The Fairchild family has long roots in New England, United States. They descend from Thomas Fairchild who came from England in 1639 and settled in Stratford, Connecticut, a part of the fledgling New Haven Colony.

== Notable members ==
Among the notable members of the family are:

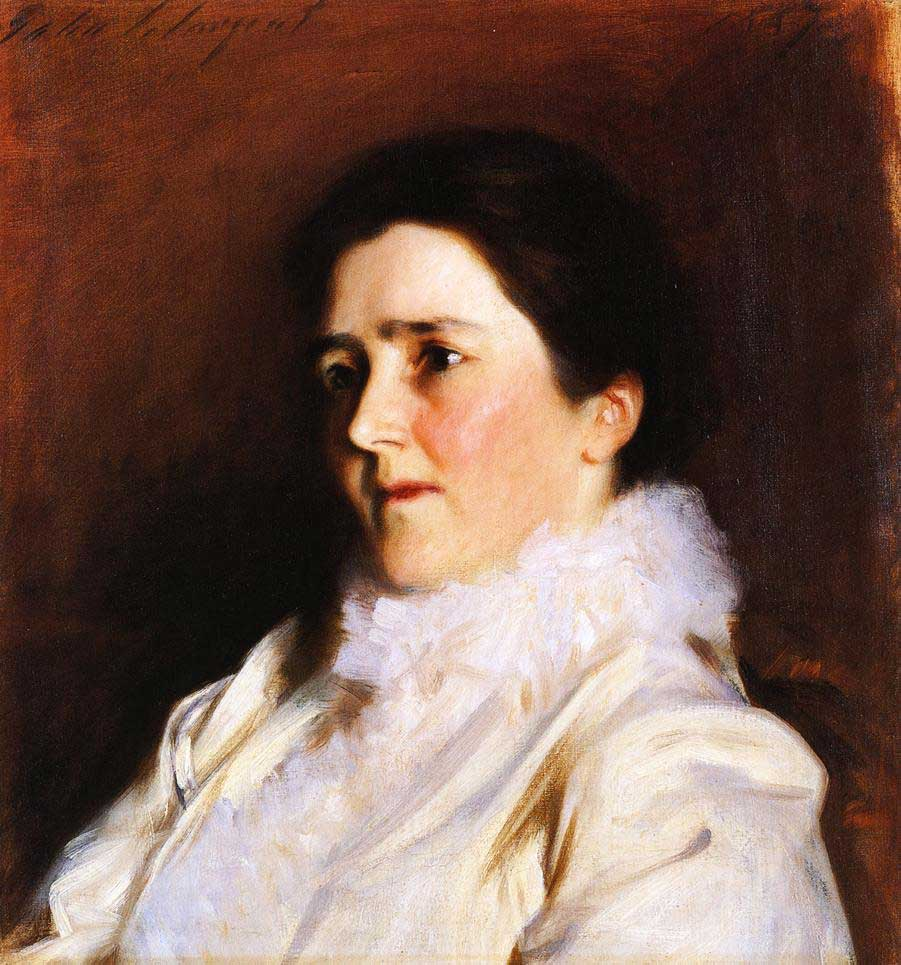
Portrait of Elizabeth Nelson Fairchild, John Singer Sargent, 1887

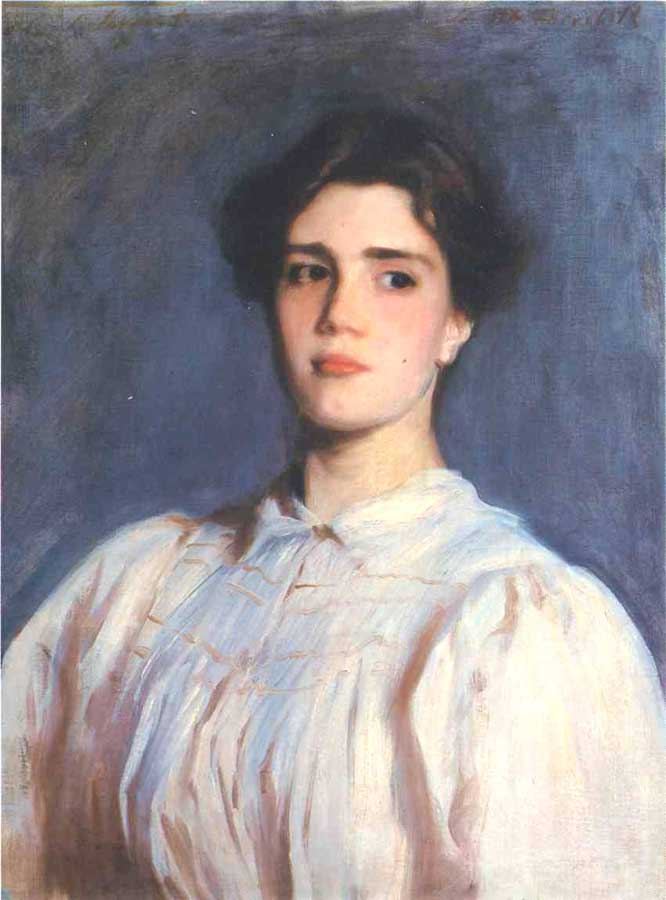
Portrait of Sally Fairchild, John Singer Sargent, c. 1885-1887

- Blair Fairchild (1877–1933), a composer
- Cassius Fairchild (1829–1868), who served in the Wisconsin State Assembly and died of wounds received in the American Civil War.
- Charles Grandison Fairchild, who was President of Rollins College. Charles married Adelaide Frances Dean.
- David Fairchild, who was a distinguished American botanist. David married Marian Hubbard Bell, a daughter of Alexander Graham Bell
- Edward Henry Fairchild
- Edward T. Fairchild, 15th chief justice of the Wisconsin Supreme Court
- Fred Rogers Fairchild
- George Fairchild, who was President of Kansas State University. George was married to Charlotte Pearl Halsted
- Alexander Graham Fairchild, who was known as Graham or Sandy. Graham married Elva Whitman
- Grandison Fairchild (1792–1890), who married Nancy Harris in 1813
- Henry Fairchild, who was President of Berea College. Henry was married to Maria Ball Babbitt
- Henry Pratt Fairchild
- Jairus C. Fairchild (1801–1862), who was the first mayor of Madison, Wisconsin, and married Sally Blair
- James Fairchild, who was President of Oberlin College
- Lucia Fairchild Fuller (1872-1924), a painter, married Henry Brown Fuller
- Lucius Fairchild (1831–1896), Governor of Wisconsin, He married Frances Bull (b. 1846)
- Thomas E. Fairchild, Wisconsin Supreme Court justice and later chief judge of the United States Court of Appeals for the Seventh Circuit

== Other descendants ==
Other descendants of Thomas Fairchild include:

- Muir Stephen Fairchild

== Sources ==
- Fairchild Family History
- Fairchild, T. M.; Fairchild Filter, Sarah Ellen (1944). The Name and Family of Fairchild. Iowa City, Iowa: The Mercer Printing Company – via Internet Archive.
