= Fairchild =

Fairchild may refer to:

== Organizations ==
- Fairchild Aerial Surveys, operated in cooperation with a subsidiary of Fairey Aviation Company
- Fairchild Camera and Instrument
- List of Sherman Fairchild companies, "Fairchild" companies
- Fairchild Fashion Media
- Fairchild Group, a Chinese-language media company in Canada
  - Fairchild TV, a Cantonese-language television channel in Canada owned by the Fairchild Group
- Fairchild-Hiller Corporation, U.S. aviation company
  - Fairchild Aircraft, an aircraft manufacturer, division of Fairchild, also variously known as Fairchild-Hiller, Fairchild-Republic and Fairchild-Dornier
  - Fairchild Aircraft Ltd. (Canada), a Canadian aircraft manufacturer
  - Fairchild Industries, Inc., U.S. aviation company, successor to Fairchild Hiller Corporation
  - Fairchild Corporation, U.S. aviation company, successor to Fairchild Industries
- Fairchild Publications, Inc.
- Fairchild Recording Equipment Corporation
- Fairchild Semiconductor, an American semiconductor company
- Fairchild Systems, U.S. defense contractor
- Sherman Fairchild Foundation

== People ==
- Fairchild (name), including list of persons with the name
- Fairchild family, descendants of Thomas Fairchild (1610–1670), English nurseryman

== Places ==
- Fairchild, Georgia
- Fairchild, Wisconsin, a village located within the town of Fairchild
- Fairchild (town), Wisconsin, a town that contains the village of Fairchild
- Fairchild Air Force Base, Washington state, USA
- Fairchild Beach, Heard Island, subantarctic waters
- Fairchild Glacier, Washington state, USA
- Fairchild Mountain, Colorado, USA
- Fairchild Peak, Antarctica
- Fairchild Tropical Botanic Garden, Coral Gables
- Fairchilds, Texas
- William R. Fairchild International Airport, Port Angeles, Washington state, USA

== Entertainment ==
- FairChild (2007 videogame), a Japanese visual novel
- The Fairchild Channel F, an early video game console

== Food ==
- Fairchild (mango), a commercial mango cultivar originating in Panama
- Fairchild tangerine

== Other ==
- Fairchild Memorial Hall, Maxwell Air Force Base, Alabama, USA

== See also ==
- Fairchildren, semiconductor companies founded by people who left the Shockley Semiconductor Laboratory
- Fairchildren (album), a 2015 album
- Fairbairn
- Fairchild House (disambiguation)
- Fairchild and North-Eastern Railway
- The Fairchild Challenge, environmental outreach program
- Justice Fairchild (disambiguation)
