= Henry Pratt Fairchild =

American sociologist (1880–1956)

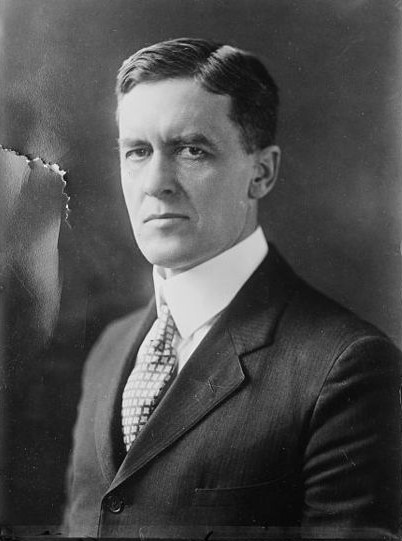
- Born: August 18, 1880; Dundee, Illinois
- Died: October 2, 1956 (aged 76); North Hollywood, California
- Occupation: Professor of Sociology
- Spouse: Mary Eleanor Townsend
- Parent(s): Arthur Babbitt Fairchild and Isabel Amanda Pratt

Henry Pratt Fairchild (August 18, 1880 – October 2, 1956) was an American sociologist who was Professor of Sociology at New York University and actively involved in many of the controversial issues of his time. He wrote about race relations, abortion and contraception, and immigration. He was involved with the founding of Planned Parenthood and served as president to the American Eugenics Society (1929–1931).

== Early life ==
Fairchild was born in Dundee, Illinois. His father was Arthur Babbitt Fairchild, a descendant of Thomas Fairchild, who settled in New England in 1639. His mother a member of the Pratt industrialist family. Henry Fairchild was his grandfather. Fred Rogers Fairchild, a professor of Political Economy at Yale University, was his brother.

Fairchild grew up in Crete, Nebraska, where his father was professor at Doane College. Fairchild attended Doane (AB, 1900). He was an instructor at the Ionian University of Smyrna after leaving Doane in 1900.

He graduated from Yale University with a PhD in 1909. He also received an honorary LL.D. from Doane in 1930.

During World War I, he worked in the War Camp Community Service.

== Organizer and professor ==
Fairchild was president of the Population Association of America from 1921 to 1925. He was president of the American Sociological Society in 1936.

He was active with Margaret Sanger in founding Planned Parenthood.

Fairchild was a professor of economics and sociology at Bowdoin College. After serving with the War Camp Community Service in World War I, he became a professor at New York University in 1919. He retired in 1945, and became chairman of the Department of Sociology in the Graduate School. Much of his work focused on race, nationalism, immigration, and ethnic conflict. He authored the 1934 textbook General Sociology.

Fairchild was fearful of overpopulation, citing Malthus. He argued that birth control was a solution to overpopulation. He was a critic of immigration to the United States, authoring the 1926 book The Melting Pot Mistake, which argued that the United States could not assimilate the vast number of immigrants that it had accepted in the previous fifty years. He also authored the 1913 book Immigration: A World Movement and Its American Significance.

He was a critic of capitalism. In 1942, he played a leading role in advocating for Earl Browder, former Communist Party secretary, to be released from jail. In 1953, he called for clemency for the Rosenbergs, Soviet spies who had been sentenced to execution.

He lived at 230 East 48th St in New York City.

== See also ==
- Eugenics in the United States
- Fairchild family
