= Edwin Fairchild =

Edwin Fairchild may refer to:

- Edwin C. Fairchild (1874–1955), socialist activist and conscientious objector during the First World War
- Edwin M. Fairchild (1865–1939), Unitarian minister and lecturer
