= Robert Wilson Crawford =

Robert Crawford
- Born: Robert Wilson Crawford; April 11, 1906; Maryland, U.S.
- Died: April 11, 1995 (aged 89); Walnut Creek, California, U.S.
- Education: Des Moines University (BS); New York University (MS)

Robert Wilson Crawford (April 11, 1906 – April 11, 1995) was an American pioneer of public park policy and served in the park and recreation field for over forty years. As the "Commissioner of Recreation" in Philadelphia, he established a national model for the local government’s provision of recreational services for all citizens, and his methods have been copied in cities nationwide.

Crawford was instrumental in establishing them as recreational areas for beneficial activities for the community. Crawford was President of the National Recreation and Park Association and a life member of its trustees' board. He was the co-founder and former executive director of the National Recreation Foundation. Philadelphia's recreational facilities grew from 94 to 815 under Crawford's leadership. He is credited with developing programs for the elderly, preschoolers, and the handicapped.

== Early life and education ==
Crawford was born in Maryland on April 11, 1906, and raised in Iowa. Crawford graduated from Des Moines University with a Bachelor of Science degree in 1929. He also attended New York University, where he received his master's degree. He graduated from the National Recreation School in New York City.

== Career ==
In 1934, Crawford began his career with a job as Director of Recreation for Hastings-on-Hudson, New York. In 1946, Crawford became superintendent of recreation in Oakland, California, for five years before moving to Philadelphia, Pennsylvania, in 1952. His first position there was recreation administrator, and later, he served as Commissioner of Recreation from 1952 until 1981. He was also the President of the Fairmount Park Commission.

As the Commissioner of Recreation, Crawford established a national model for the local government’s provision of recreational services for all citizens. Under his leadership, parks in the city added trails for hikers, basketball courts for people who used wheelchairs, and exercise programs based in community centers for the elderly. He also set up advisory groups to identify the recreational needs in specific neighborhoods. When he first came to Philadelphia in 1952, the city had 95 recreational areas. By the time he left, it had 815, including parks, playgrounds, swimming pools, and community centers. Crawford worked in Philadelphia for 29 years.

Much of Crawford's career was spent lobbying government officials to increase the number of parks and recreational programs.

As Executive Director, he played a key role in the development and growth of the National Recreation Foundation. Crawford conceived the Recreation and Park Hall of Fame in 1987, while serving as Executive Director of the National Recreation Foundation.

Crawford retired on July 1, 1981. Philadelphia Mayor William Green praised him, saying, "If recreation were baseball, he would be a Babe Ruth or a Hank Aaron. If recreation were boxing, he would be a Joe Louis or Jack Dempsey." He stated that no one would be able to take Crawford's place after he left.

Temple University Libraries holds a collection of his professional papers where he held an Honorary Degree of Doctor of Public Service. He also held an Honorary Degree of Doctor of Law from Grinnell College. The Robert W. Crawford Achievement Prize is named in his honor.

In 1993, Crawford published his autobiography, Reflections of a Recreational Professional (ISBN 0-929581-76-8/ISBN 978-0-929581-76-7). All financial proceeds were donated to the National Recreation and Park Association.

== Personal life ==
He was married to Dorothy Mollenhoff Crawford, who died in 1992. They had one son.

Crawford died on April 11, 1995, on his 89th birthday, in Walnut Creek, California, from heart failure.
