= Fairchild House =

Fairchild House may refer to:

in the United Kingdom

- Fairchild House, Hoxton, apartment block in London
- Fairchild House, Pimlico, apartment block in London

in the United States

(by state)

- Fairchild House (Monticello, Kentucky), listed on the National Register of Historic Places in Kentucky
- Fairchild Mansion, Oneonta, New York, listed on the NRHP in New York
- Fairchild House (Syracuse, New York), listed on the NRHP in New York

== See also ==
- Fairchild (disambiguation)
