= National Recreation Foundation =

The National Recreation Foundation (NRF) is a non-profit organization that provides and encourages youth with recreational activities to improve their quality of life. The Foundation promotes healthy lifestyles in communities across the United States by partnering with local, state and national agencies. The Foundation was begun during World War I as a way to provide men in the military with recreational activities while on leave. The NRF provides grant money to projects that are in line with its mission. This organization has awarded the Robert W. Crawford Achievement Prize annually since 2002. It goes to those who have made significant contributions to the recreation field by helping at-risk youth.

== History ==
The National Recreation Foundation began as the War Camp Community Service (WCCS), during World War I in 1917. Its goal was to provide military men on the homefront with recreational activities. After the war, the WCCS focused on supporting recreational development at home. It was reorganized into the NRF in 1965. Its mission is to promote healthy lifestyles for at-risk youth.

== Mission ==
The NRF is a non-profit organization concerned with the overall health at-risk youth. The Foundation works at improving mental, physical, and social health through recreational activities. It also promotes healthy lifestyles in communities across the United States by partnering with local, state and national agencies. For instance, by supporting the building of more city parks and playgrounds for the improvement of one's physical and mental well-being.

It provides grant money to projects that are in line with its mission. The NRF has been giving grants since 1965. Its board of trustees searches for grant recipients, which is an unusual feature. The National Recreation Foundation donates to charities that support its mission.

They also award the Robert W. Crawford Achievement Prize to people who make significant contributions to the recreation field by helping at-risk youth. Crawford (1906–1995) was a dedicated and innovative executive for decades.

The NRF is associated with the National Recreation and Park Association. Its newsletter covers a variety of related topics.
