= Mystic Order of Veiled Prophets of the Enchanted Realm =

Masonic organization in the United States

MOVPER logo

The Mystic Order of Veiled Prophets of the Enchanted Realm (MOVPER), often known as the Grotto, is a Masonic body founded in 1889 by Herman LeRoy Fairchild and the members of Hamilton Lodge in Hamilton, New York. MOVPER describes itself as a "social organisation for the Master Mason". Although its members must be Master Masons, MOVPER "is not and makes no claim to be a part of Symbolic Craft Masonry".

== History ==
On September 10, 1889, Fairchild, along with other members of Hamilton Lodge #120 in Hamilton, New York, formed a group known as the Fairchild Deviltry Committee. Membership was limited to Master Masons in good standing. The group's popularity grew, leading to the formal establishment of the Supreme Council, the Mystic Order of Veiled Prophets of the Enchanted Realm (MOVPER), on June 13, 1890.

The first "Grand Monarch" (the leader of the order) was Thomas Lemuel James, ex-Postmaster General of the United States. Other founders included Professor Oren Root of Hamilton College, Joseph Frank McGregory of Madison University, General William M. Nest and Fairchild, both of Hamilton, New York, as well as Naval Officer William Colgate Eaton. George Beal wrote the order's original ritual with help from Adon N. Smith and Rudolph R. Riddell, who later revised the ritual to include mythological elements and Persian imagery.

== The Veiled Prophet ==
MOVPER's emblem features a depiction of Mokanna, symbolising the veil of secrecy, which represents the mysterious nature of the Order, reflecting the lessons that members of the Grotto are encouraged to explore.

While the emblem and ritual of the Grotto are often believed to be inspired by Thomas Moore's poem, Lalla Rookh, which tells the story of the "Veiled Prophet of Khorasan," the modern ritual of the Grotto organisation actually draws inspiration from Masonic traditions and incorporates elements that allude to Moore's themes. Each Grotto branch is allowed to add its own interpretation of the story.

== Philosophy and attire ==
MOVPER is guided by a philosophy that is deeply rooted in the concept of "Good Fellowship", which, according to The Grotto, represents a "spirit of wholesome fun". Different fezzes are worn to signify various ranks within the organisation.

== Female auxiliaries ==
=== Daughters of Mokanna ===
The Daughters of Mokanna, a women's auxiliary organisation, was founded in 1919. Four original subchapters, Daughters of Mokanna, were also opened.

To be eligible for membership, candidates must be adult women, relatives of a Veiled Prophet, and in good standing within their community.

As with MOVPER, different fezzes are worn to signify various ranks within the organisation.

=== Mysterious Order Witches of Salem ===
Sometime before 1917, the Mysterious Order Witches of Salem (MOWOS) was founded as another female auxiliary to The Grotto. They named their Chicago chapter the "Aryan Cauldron No.1."

Like its counterpart, the group's stated purpose is fun, fellowship, and charity activities. The MOWOS has rituals only known to members. Membership requirements are identical to the Daughters of Mokanna.
