= Mary Salome Cutler Fairchild =

American librarian and library educator (1855–1921)

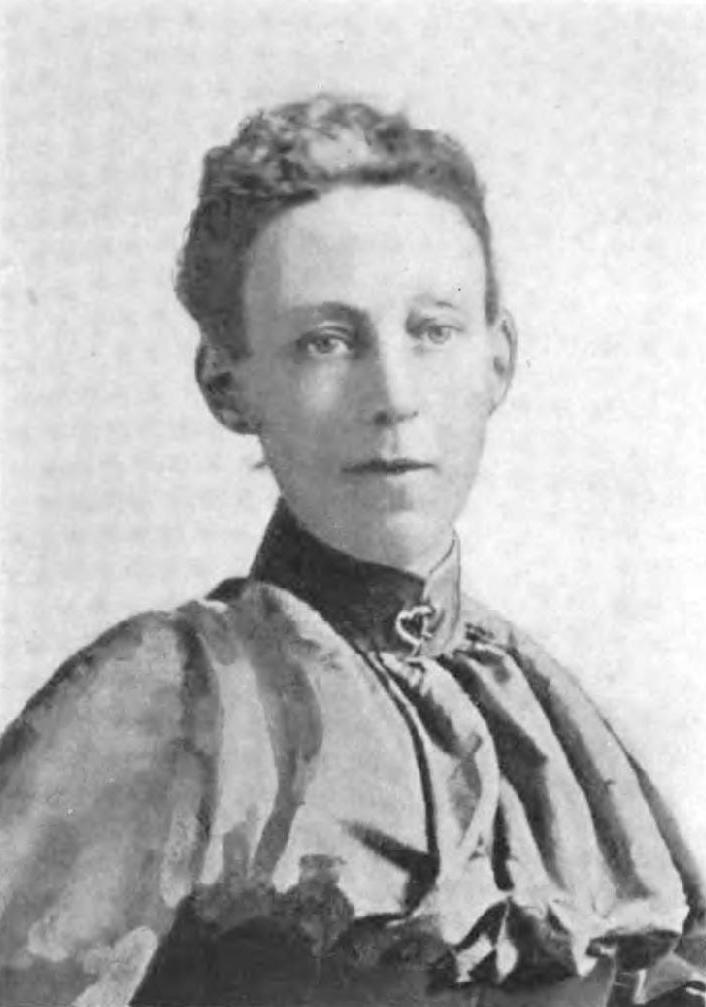
- Born: June 21, 1855; Dalton, Massachusetts
- Died: December 20, 1921 (aged 66); Takoma Park, Maryland
- Other names: Mary Salome Cutler; Salome Cutler; Salome Cutler Fairchild
- Education: Mount Holyoke College University of the State of New York
- Occupations: Librarian; educator; administrator
- Organization: American Library Association
- Spouse: Edwin M. Fairchild

Mary Salome Cutler Fairchild (née Mary Salome Cutler; June 21, 1855 – December 20, 1921) was a pioneering American librarian, educator, and school administrator. She is known for her contributions to the establishment of library science in the United States through her work at the Columbia College library and New York State Library School, as well as her service in the American Library Association.

== Life and career ==
Mary Salome Cutler was born in Dalton, Massachusetts, to Lydia Wakefield and Artemas Hubbard Cutler, a papermaker. She graduated from Mount Holyoke Female Seminary (now Mount Holyoke College) in 1875, then taught Latin at her alma mater from 1876 to 1878.

After ill health forced her to stop teaching, she began to pursue librarianship, as she was intrigued by the work of the newly-organized American Library Association (founded in 1876). In 1884, she worked at a small country library, after which she contacted Melvil Dewey, then-librarian of Columbia College, about library-related employment. Dewey hired her as a cataloger, and she became head cataloger of the Columbia library in 1885. In 1887, Dewey opened the Columbia College School of Library Economy, the first librarian training institution in the United States, and hand-selected Cutler as a cataloging instructor. Two years later, Dewey resigned from Columbia to work as the director of the New York State Library, and he moved the School of Library Economy to Albany, New York, as officials at the all-male Columbia chafed at the admission of women to the library school. Cutler "sympathized with Dewey's vision of librarianship" and moved with him and the school. In Albany, the School of Library Economy was reorganized and renamed the New York State Library School, and Cutler was appointed vice director in 1889. Under her direction, an exam and a Bachelor's degree were added to the entrance requirements. She also oversaw the expansion of the scope of library training to better suit public service as professional educators, her ideal of the librarian. Additionally, she pioneered library services for the blind, in memory of her blind father, by organizing the New York State Library for the Blind. In 1891, Cutler was awarded a bachelor's degree in library science by the University of the State of New York.

[S]he brought Dewey's dream to reality. She made the library school a model which was imitated by other merging library schools in the country. She set standards within the profession, instituted rigorous entrance examinations for students, and trained students actively to promote reading and the public library movement.

— Janet Butler Munch, Encyclopedia USA: The encyclopedia of the United States of America, Past and Present, "Mary Salome Cutler Fairchild (librarian)"

She was the Executive Director of the American Library Association (ALA) in 1891, a member of the ALA's Council from 1892 to 1898 and from 1909 to 1914, and ALA vice president from 1894 to 1895 and from 1900 to 1901. As an exhibit committee chair for the World's Columbian Exposition in 1893, she established and compiled a catalog for a model library with 5,000 volumes. Cutler married Edwin M. Fairchild, a Unitarian Minister, in 1897. By the early 1900s, she was going by the name Salome Cutler Fairchild.

After falling ill in 1905, Cutler Fairchild had to retire from the library for the blind and the library school. By the time of her retirement, she had trained around 500 students in librarianship. Though her professional activities after 1905 were limited, she continued to contribute to the field through articles she wrote and submitted to journals, as well as through lectures and presentations she gave on book selection and the history of libraries. Upon the death of Alice B. Kroeger, another of Dewey's students and the founder of library science program at Drexel University, Cutler Fairchild served as interim director of the Drexel Library School for four months from 1909 to 1910.

Cutler Fairchild died December 20, 1921, in Takoma Park, Maryland. Her and her husband's papers are kept in the Edwin Milton Fairchild Collection at Duke University, while some of her letters are kept in the Melvil Dewey Papers at Columbia University. In 1951, she was listed in "A Library Hall of Fame" as one of forty "accomplished leaders of the American library movement" by Library Journal.

== Work on women in libraries ==
In 1904, Cutler Fairchild was asked by the President of the American Library Association to prepare a statistical statement on "Women in American Libraries" which was published in the December 1904 issue of the Library Journal. She opened the article by showing the growing prominence of women in American libraries through comparison of three conferences of the American Library Association. "At the first meeting of the Association in Philadelphia, 1876, only 12 of the 103 members present were women; at the Chicago meeting in 1893, 166 of the 305 members present were women; at Magnolia in 1902, the largest conference yet held, 736 out of 1018 members present were women". To further illustrate her opinion that there was no discrimination in regard to sex in the American Library Association, she refers to Miss Caroline M. Hewins, librarian of the Hartford Public Library, who was the first woman to ask a question before a meeting of the American Library Association in 1877, the association's second meeting, and Miss Mary A. Bean, the librarian of the Brookline Public Library, who was the first woman to appear on a library program, by reading a paper on "The evil of unlimited freedom in the use of juvenile fiction" in the 1879 meeting in Boston. Cutler Fairchild credits the open-minded attitude of the men in the library movement for contributing to the lack of self-consciousness displayed by women in association meetings by taking what women said or wrote at its actual value. However, she noted that participation by women in American Library Association meetings was disproportionate to their attendance. Cutler Fairchild continued her evaluation of women in libraries by surveying 100 representative libraries to access the number of professional and non-professional positions and their salaries held by women as compared to those held by men. The results of her inquiries proved that women greatly outnumbered men in the libraries selected, holding a large proportion of administrative positions but with little administrative responsibility, and outnumbered men in non-administrative responsible positions, but seldom held positions with the most responsibility. In addition, women did not hold positions offering the highest salaries, but rather appeared to perform the same level of work for less compensation. The following reasons were given for this discrepancy:

1. She [that is, women in general] has not the temperamental fitness for the exercise of large authoritative control over a mixed staff.
2. She is not in touch with the world of affairs.
3. She is distinctly unbusinesslike.
4. She shuns rather than courts responsibility.
5. She is conservative and afraid of legitimate experiments.
6. She lacks originality.
7. She lacks a sense of proportion and the power of taking a large, imperative view of things.

Despite these criticisms of women's ability to hold responsible library positions, women continued to push men out of the library field, just as in the teaching field, because they could be paid less than men, as was legal at the time.

Cutler Fairchild did find agreement among the criticizers that positions requiring "gracious hospitality" were held more successfully by women including the head of small or medium-sized libraries and all work with children. "'Her broad sympathies, her quick wits, her intuitions and her delight in self-sacrifice' give her an undoubted advantage."
