= Rudolph R. Riddell =

American Civil War Medal of Honor recipient (1847–1913)

Lieutenant Rudolph Romeo Riddell
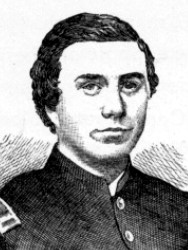
- Riddell in 1864
- Born: 11 February 1847; Hamilton, New York, US
- Died: 8 September 1913 (aged 66); Hamilton, New York, US
- Burial place: Madison Street Cemetery, Hamilton, New York
- Military career
- Allegiance: United States (Union)
- Branch: Army
- Service years: 1862-1865
- Rank: Lieutenant
- Units: Company I, 61st New York Volunteer Infantry
- Commands: Company I, 61st New York Volunteer Infantry
- Conflicts: Battle of Sailor's Creek
- Awards: Medal of Honor

Rudolph Romeo Riddell (11 February 1847 – 8 September 1913) was a Lieutenant in the United States Army who was awarded the Medal of Honor for gallantry during the American Civil War. On 6 April 1865, Riddell captured the flag of the 6th Alabama Cavalry of the Confederate Army. For this action, he was awarded the Medal of Honor on 10 May 1865. After the war, he lectured and wrote on various subjects and served as the Chief of the Bureau of Information and Statistics for the New York State Department of Agriculture.

== Personal life ==
Riddell was born in Hamilton, New York on 11 February 1847 to parents David Riddell and Polly Parks Riddell. He was the younger of two children. In 1869, he married Annie Naomi Palmer. He had no known children. Riddell died on 8 September 1913 in Hamilton and was buried in Madison Street Cemetery in Hamilton.

== Military service ==
Riddell enlisted in the Union Army as a drummer at the age of 15. He was eventually promoted to the rank of Lieutenant and commanded Company I of the 61st New York Volunteer Infantry. On 6 April 1865, during the Battle of Sailor's Creek near Farmville, Virginia, he captured the flag of the 6th Alabama Cavalry of the Confederate Army. This action allowed him to receive the Medal of Honor on 10 May 1865. He later became the captain of his company and later brevet major under General Nelson A. Miles. He was honorably discharged from the Army in 1865.

Riddell's Medal of Honor citation reads:

The President of the United States of America, in the name of Congress, takes pleasure in presenting the Medal of Honor to Lieutenant Rudolph R. Riddell, United States Army, for extraordinary heroism on 6 April 1865, while serving with Company I, 61st New York Infantry, in action at Deatonsville (Sailor's Creek), Virginia. Lieutenant Riddell captured the flag of the 6th Alabama Cavalry (Confederate States of America).

— R. A. Alger, Secretary of War

== Post-military activities ==
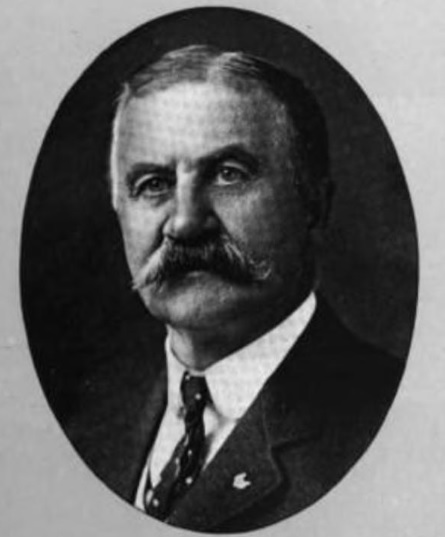
Rudolph R. Riddell (c.1910)

After leaving the army Riddell entered Holbrook's Military Academy to prepare for college. He graduated from Colgate University in 1871 with an A. B. degree and received an honorary LL. D. from the University of Chicago. After leaving college, he lectured and wrote on social, literary, and religious subjects. He was an active Republican worker and campaigner for many years. He later served as the Chief of the Bureau of Information and Statistics, New York State Department of Agriculture.

He was a Freemason and one of the founders of the Mystic Order of Veiled Prophets of the Enchanted Realm ("Grotto") and the author of its ritual.
