= Charles Fairchild =

American academic

- Born: 1843; Birmingham, Michigan, United States
- Died: 1933 (aged 89–90)
- Occupation: Educator
- Father: Edward Henry Fairchild

Charles Grandison Fairchild (1843–1933) was an American educator.

Fairchild was born in Birmingham, Michigan, the son of Edward Henry Fairchild.

After serving in the Union cavalry during the Civil War, Fairchild graduated from Oberlin College (AB, 1866). After further theological studies at Oberlin, Fairchild was ordained in the Congregational Church.

In the early 1870s, He toured Europe as manager for the original Jubilee singers of Fisk University.

Fairchild was a gifted fundraiser for colleges. From 1873 to 1881, Fairchild taught physics and served as a fundraiser for Berea College in Berea, Kentucky. During that time his father was president of Berea. From 1881 to 1893, he taught chemistry and physics and served as a fundraiser for Oberlin where his uncle James was president.

In 1893, he became president of Rollins College in Winter Park, Florida. He served for two years. From 1904 to 1918, Fairchild worked for the Board of Education of New York, NY.
