= Edwin M. Fairchild =

American Unitarian minister and lecturer (1865-1939)

- Born: November 7, 1865; Lansing, Michigan, U.S.
- Died: December 26, 1939 (aged 74); Takoma Park, Montgomery County, Maryland, U.S.
- Occupations: minister lecturer
- Spouse: Mary Salome Cutler (m. 1897)

Edwin Milton Fairchild (November 7, 1865 - December 26, 1939) was a Unitarian minister and lecturer.

Fairchild was a descendant of Thomas Fairchild, an early settler in New England. He was a son of George Fairchild, and grandson of Grandison Fairchild.

In 1911, he was a founder of the Character Education Institute.

On July 1, 1897, Fairchild married Mary Salome Cutler, a pioneer in the modern library movement.
