= George Fairchild =

American academic (1838–1901)

George Thompson Fairchild
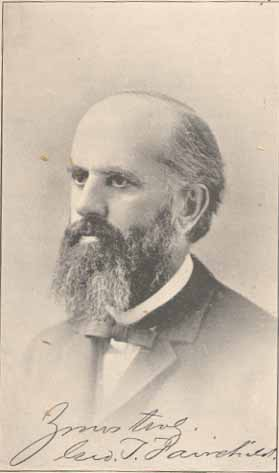
- Born: October 6, 1838; Lorain County, Ohio, United States
- Died: March 16, 1901 (aged 62); Columbus, Ohio, United States
- Education: Oberlin College, Ohio
- Occupations: educator university president
- Spouse: Charlotte Pearly Halsted (m. 1863)
- Children: 5
- Father: Grandison Fairchild
- Relatives: James Fairchild (brother); Edward Henry Fairchild (brother)

George Thompson Fairchild (October 6, 1838 – March 16, 1901) was an American educator and university president.

Fairchild was the son of Grandison Fairchild. George was born on a farm in rural Lorain County, Ohio, and graduated with two degrees from Oberlin (AB 1862, MA 1865).

In 1865, Fairchild began his academic career as an instructor at State Agricultural College of Michigan (later Michigan State University). The following year he was made professor of English, a position he retained through the 1860s and 1870s. Fairchild was also a vice president of Michigan State, and in 1878 he served as acting president.

== Kansas State Presidency ==
In 1879, Fairchild was appointed as the third President of Kansas State Agricultural College in Manhattan, Kansas (later Kansas State University), assuming office on December 1. Interestingly, during the same period, one of his brothers, James Fairchild, served as President of Oberlin College, while another brother, Edward Henry Fairchild, held the presidency at Berea College, known for its progressive stance.

During his tenure at Kansas State, Fairchild entered into a debate about the role of land grant colleges. Despite suggestions that the college focus solely on agricultural and mechanical arts, Fairchild advocated for reintroducing a classical liberal arts education. He famously stated, "Our college exists not so much to make men farmers as to make farmers men."[1] Fairchild reinstated classics courses, recruited distinguished professors, and significantly increased both the number and quality of students, raising enrollment from 207 to 734 during his presidency.[2] Notable figures such as Ernest Fox Nichols, Philip Fox, Walter T. Swingle, Charles Lester Marlatt, and David Fairchild (his son) were among those who studied at the institution during his leadership.

Fairchild served as President until June 30, 1897, when he resigned following a contentious restructuring of the college by members of the Populist Party on the state Board of Regents. This restructuring led to the dismissal of a significant portion of the teaching faculty due to ideological disagreements with the direction of the university. In response, Fairchild published an influential article in The American Journal of Sociology, accusing party politicians of attempting to convert Kansas State Agricultural College into a "school of socialism."[3] He specifically criticized Regent Christian B. Hoffman, recently returned from the utopian community at Topolobampo in Mexico, as a key instigator. Education leaders nationwide expressed support for Fairchild through letters as he departed.[4]

Following his resignation, Fairchild became a professor of English and Vice President at Berea College in Berea, Kentucky. During this period, his book Rural Wealth and Welfare: Economic Principles Illustrated and Applied in Farm Life was published by Macmillan Company in 1900.

== Family life ==
In 1863, Fairchild married Charlotte Pearly Halsted. They had five children:

- Agnes Mary Fairchild Kirshner
- Edwin Milton
- Paul Halsted
- David Grandison, a noted biologist and plant explorer
- Anna Della Fairchild White

== Legacy ==
- Fairchild Hall, on the Kansas State campus, is named in his honor. The building, completed during his tenure in 1894, is home to the K-State Graduate School.
- The Fairchild Theater, on the Michigan State campus, is also named in his honor.
