= Credit Foncier =

Credit Foncier may refer to:

- Crédit Foncier d'Algérie et de Tunisie
- Crédit Foncier d'Extrême-Orient
- Crédit Foncier de France, a mortgage bank in France 1852–2019
- Crédit Foncier de l'Indochine
- Crédit foncier franco-canadien, Canadian mortgage company (1880–1986)
- Credit Foncier of America, a late 19th-century financing and real estate company in Omaha, Nebraska
- Credit Foncier of Sinaloa, a late 19th-century financing and real estate company in Colorado that carried out the Topolobampo (colony) scheme
