= Joseph Frank McGregory =

American chemist (1855–1934)

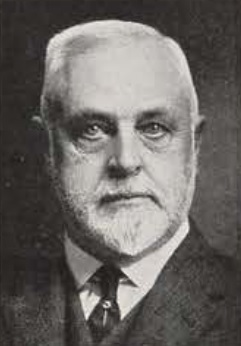
- Born: April 11, 1855; Wilbraham, Massachusetts, U.S.
- Died: October 14, 1934 (aged 79); Hamilton, New York, U.S.
- Occupation: Chemist

Joseph Frank McGregory (April 11, 1855 – October 14, 1934) was an American chemist. He was the founder and first chairman of the Chemistry Department at Colgate University (then Madison University) in 1884.

== Biography ==
McGregory was the son of Joseph and Emeline (Fuller) McGregory. He was educated at Wilbraham Academy. He was a member of Phi Beta Kappa and Delta Upsilon. He received his B.A. degree from Amherst College in 1880 and his M.A. three years later. In 1880–1883 he was an instructor in chemistry at Amherst. In 1905 Amherst awarded him the degree of Doctor of Science. McGregory was called to Colgate, then Madison University, to found the Department of Chemistry and Mineralogy. During the early years of his appointment, he undertook extensive research at the Universities of Göttingen and Heidelberg. He built up the chemistry department at Colgate and expanded it during his years as head. He wrote two textbooks, Qualitative Analysis and Inorganic Chemistry, which were widely used in college courses.

McGregory was a fellow of the Chemical Society of London, a member of the American Association for the Advancement of Science, and the American Chemical Society. He was also a member of the German Chemical Society, Alpha Chi Sigma, and The Chemists' Club.

In 1883 McGregory married Emma E. J. Hodgkins. The couple had a son. McGregory died at his home from injuries sustained in a car accident ten days earlier. In 1920 he was seriously injured in an accident on the New York Central Railroad near Schenectady.

== Freemasonry ==
In addition to his university activities, McGregory was active in civic affairs and was one of the founders of the Mystic Order of Veiled Prophets of the Enchanted Realm, an appendant body of Freemasonry. He was the first Grand Alchemist of the order and later served as Grand Monarch.

== Writings ==
- McGregory, Joseph Frank (1903). A Manual of Qualitative Chemical Analysis. Ginn.
- McGregory, Joseph Frank (1902). Lecture Notes, on General Chemistry. Republican power print.
