= Marie Howland =

American feminist (1836–1921)

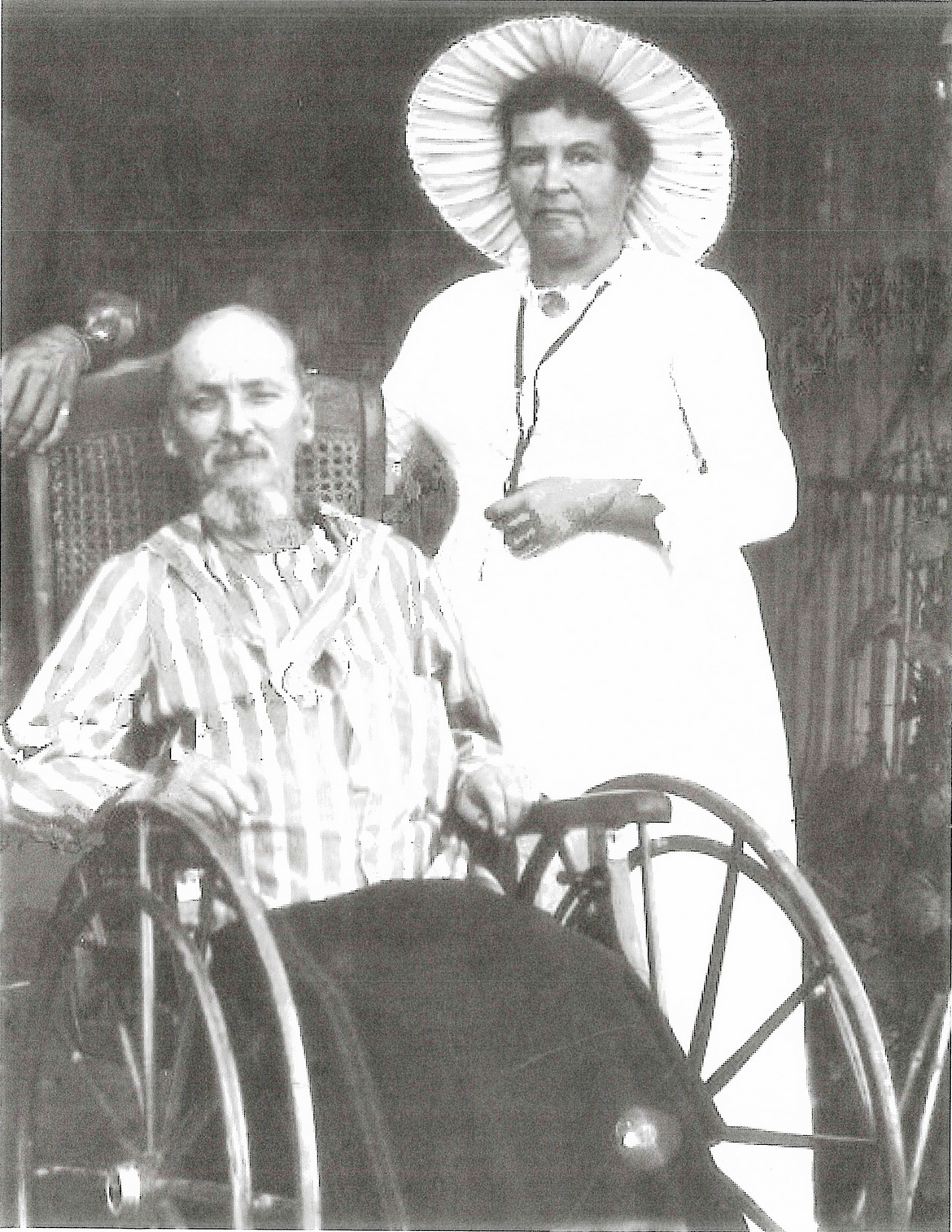
Edward & Marie Howland in Topolobampo colony (ca. 1880-90)

Marie Stevens Case Howland (1836 – September 18, 1921) was an American feminist writer of the nineteenth century, who was closely associated with the utopian socialist movements of her era.

Marie Stevens had to leave school and support her younger sister when their father died in 1847; at the age of twelve she went to work in a cotton mill in Lowell, Massachusetts. In the ensuing decade she moved to New York City, graduated from the New York Normal College and became a teacher, and married a radical lawyer, Lyman Case. She lived with Case at Stephen Pearl Andrews's co-operative Unity House at 17 Stuyvesant St., where she met her second husband, Edward Howland, a financer, writer, and editor for The Saturday Press, America's first Bohemian journal, a journal Marie would contribute to, also. Consistent with Marie and Lyman's Free-Love-Leaguer philosophy, Lyman noticed the "Passional Attraction" between Marie and Edward, and offered Marie a divorce so the two could be free to love, and so they divorced and Marie and Edward were married.

Howland was noteworthy in that she "actually lived in three utopian communities of very different size and denomination...." In 1864 she and Howland lived for a time at the Fourierist "Familistère" established in Guise by the French industrialist and reformer Jean-Baptiste Godin. Howland later used the experience as the subject of her best-known work, Papa's Own Girl (1874), a novel about an American father and daughter living in a comparable fictional establishment in New England. The heroine, Clara Forest, goes on to live a satisfying life as an independent businesswoman. The book was controversial but also a popular success in its day. Later editions altered the title to The Familistère.

The Howlands returned to the United States after the end of the American Civil War, and in 1868 they settled in Hammonton, New Jersey, where they were part of a circle of radical thinkers and activists in Hammonton and Vineland. (Both towns were another type of planned community, created by a capitalist promoter instead of utopian idealists.) Howland was an active journalist throughout her career; she also translated Godin's Solutions sociales (1871) into English as Social Solutions (1886).

Howland was an admirer and supporter of Edward Bellamy after the publication of his famous Looking Backward in 1888; conversely, Howland's work has been cited as a possible influence on Bellamy.

In the late 1880s and the 1890s Howland was associated with Albert Kimsey Owen's planned community, the Topolobampo colony, or "Pacific City" in Topolobampo, Mexico. Howland edited the community's periodical. She left there when the experiment ended in 1894. (Her husband had died in 1890.)

Howland spent her final years in one more planned community, Fairhope, founded on Mobile Bay in Alabama in 1894. She became the town's librarian and wrote for its newspaper. She died on September 18, 1921.
