= William Colgate Eaton =

American professor and commodore

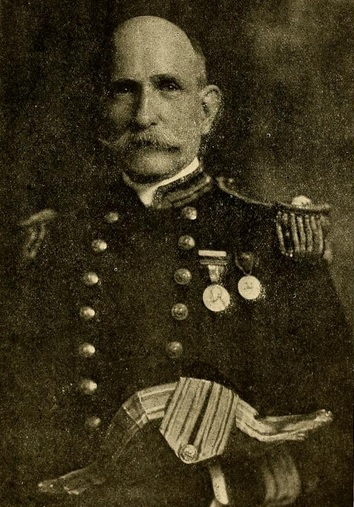
- William Colgate Eaton, picture published in 1911
- Born: February 4, 1851; Hamilton, New York, U.S.
- Died: June 1, 1936 (aged 85); Hamilton, New York, U.S.
- Military career
- Branch: United States Navy
- Service years: 1874–1908
- Rank: Commodore
- Commands: Fleet engineer of the Pacific Squadron

William Colgate Eaton (February 4, 1851 – June 1, 1936) was a commodore in the United States Navy and professor of engineering at Madison University (now Colgate University). He was also a noted numismatist and Freemason.

== Biography ==
Eaton was the son of George Washington Eaton and Eliza H. (Boardman) Eaton. His father was the president of Madison University 1856–1868 and of the seminary 1861–1871. Eaton's middle name came from his father's friendship with the Colgate family.

Eaton graduated from Madison with an A.B. in 1869, an A.M. in 1872, and a PhD in 1881. He graduated from the United States Naval Academy in 1874. He served in various capacities as a naval officer, chiefly in the Department of Engineering. Eaton was appointed head of the engineering department at Madison University in 1888–1890. From 1891 to 1894 he served in the Asiatic Squadron. In 1892 he was appointed by Li Hongzhang as examiner of naval engineering graduates at Imperial Tientsin University, China. He then served as fleet engineer of the Pacific Squadron 1899–1900. During the Spanish–American War he was chief engineer on the USS Amphitrite, which participated in the bombardment of San Juan. After the war he was commissioned chief engineer. He retired at his own request as commodore in 1908. During World War I, Eaton was recalled to service as Inspector of Engineering Material and Ordnance in Cincinnati.

He married Lizzie Blish in 1890 and they had one son.

== Freemasonry ==
Eaton was a freemason and a shriner and was one of the founders of the Mystic Order of Veiled Prophets of the Enchanted Realm, an appendant body of Freemasonry.

== Numismatics ==
Eaton was a member of the American Numismatic Association and was a collector of Civil War tokens. He drilled two holes in each cent so that he could string them together in a seven-foot chain. Eaton was "one of the pioneers of Lincoln Cent collecting, and perhaps the only person to take this activity seriously within the numismatic community at the time". He contributed articles to The Numismatist.
