= Christian B. Hoffman =

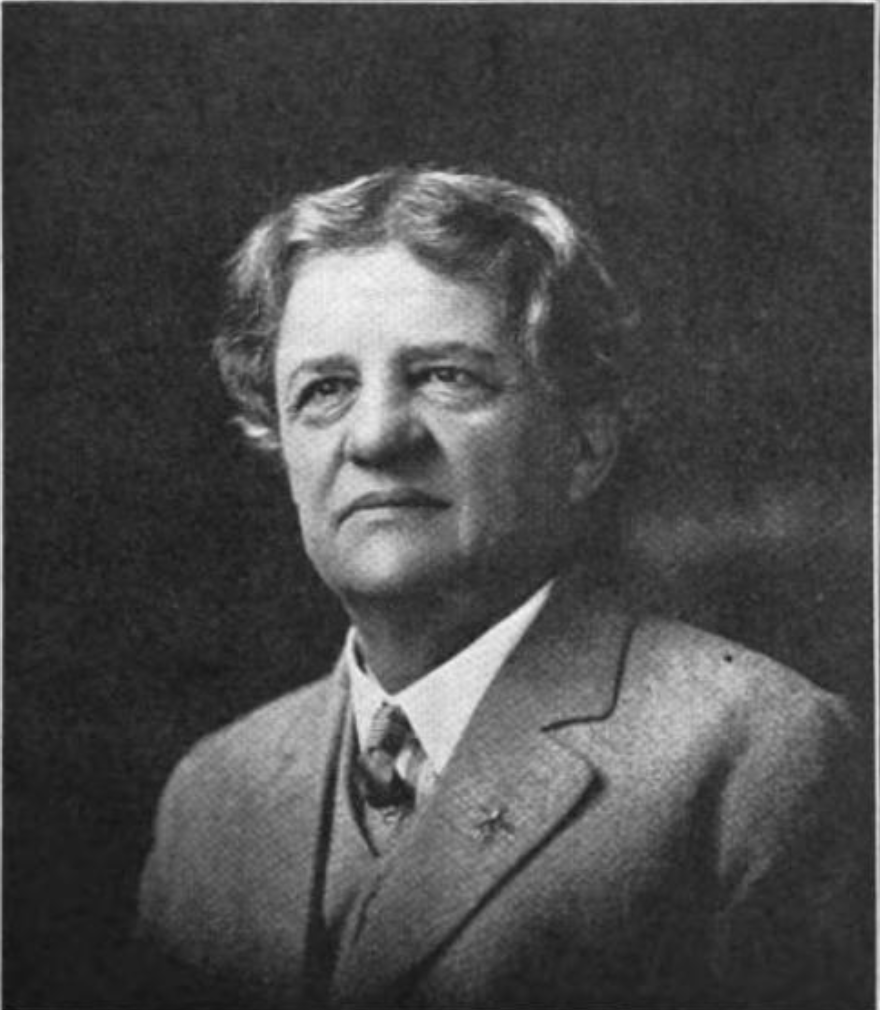
Hoffman in a 1915 publication

Christian B. Hoffman (1851-1915) was a Swiss-born American merchant, miller, banker, politician and social reformer who an active interest in educational affairs.

== Early life and education ==
Christian Balzac Hoffman was born in Azmoos, Switzerland, on 30 November, 1851. Hoffman was the only child of Christian Hoffman. In 1855, when C. B. Hoffman was a child three years old, his father and mother migrated to the United States, settling at Fond du Lac, Wisconsin. In 1856. the family moved to Leavenworth, Kansas. Two years later, they moved to Dickinson County, Kansas.

The foundation for the milling business of the family was established by the elder Hoffman in 1868 at Enterprise. The modest beginning was a four-stone mill of 75 barrels capacity. This mill was then the farthest Western plant in Kansas. It realized the hopes of the elder Hoffman, for grist was frequently delivered to it for a distance of 60 miles (97 km) and it proved to be the start of what became a modern mill of 1,500 barrels capacity at Enterprise.

Hoffman was only 16 years old when his father erected the first stone mill at Enterprise. During the first few years of the operation of the mill, Hoffman was receiving his education in the public schools at Warrenton, Missouri. He attended the Central Wesleyan College of Warrenton, Missouri, from which he was graduated in the Class of 1872. He studied under private tutors and specialized in economics.

== Career ==
In 1872, he returned to his home, where his scholarship brought him an offer to teach school at Turkey Creek, near Enterprise.

In 1873, he began in the milling business with his father, which in 1885, was incorporated as the C. Hoffman and Son Milling Company. This business was a leading industry of Enterprise, Kansas. The annual output was about 120,000 barrels of flour; 30,000 barrels of meal were also sold annually, and 15,000 barrels of rye flour. They shipped about 300 carloads of corn annually, and about one half of their flour was sent to foreign markets. Employment was furnished to about 35 men, and the business was on a good paying basis. Probably no other Kansas miller did more, in the early days of the industry in the state, to extend the market for Kansas flour than did the firm of C. Hoffman & Son, of Enterprise, of which Christian B. Hoffman was the junior partner. The plant enjoyed great success under the new arrangement, and in 1884, a roller system was installed and the plant's capacity increased to 400 barrels. In 1898, under Christian B. Hoffman's management, it was further enlarged to 1,000 barrels. In 1884, when the Hoffman mill was converted into the roller system, through the initiative that made Hoffman a leader in his business, he exported the first Kansas flour ever sent outside of the borders of the United States. This flour was sold to Eugene M. Janssen & Co. of Antwerp, Belgium.

In 1881, he was elected to the Kansas State Legislature on the Republican ticket. He was a member of that body for several terms and enjoyed the distinction of having been the author of the first maximum freight bill and the first 3-cent fare bill presented in Kansas.

He was also a member of the Railroad Committee. In 1884, he made an unsuccessful independent race for senator in the district composed of Ottawa and Dickinson Counties. Since that time, Hoffman was independent in polities. In 1880, Hoffman became a member of the State Central Committee of the Union Labor party and in 1890, affiliated with the People's party.

In 1884, Hoffman established the Enterprise Bank, serving as president. For two years, the business was carried on under his personal control, with the aid of a cashier. He was also president of the Ehrsam Machine Company since its incorporation in Enterprise.

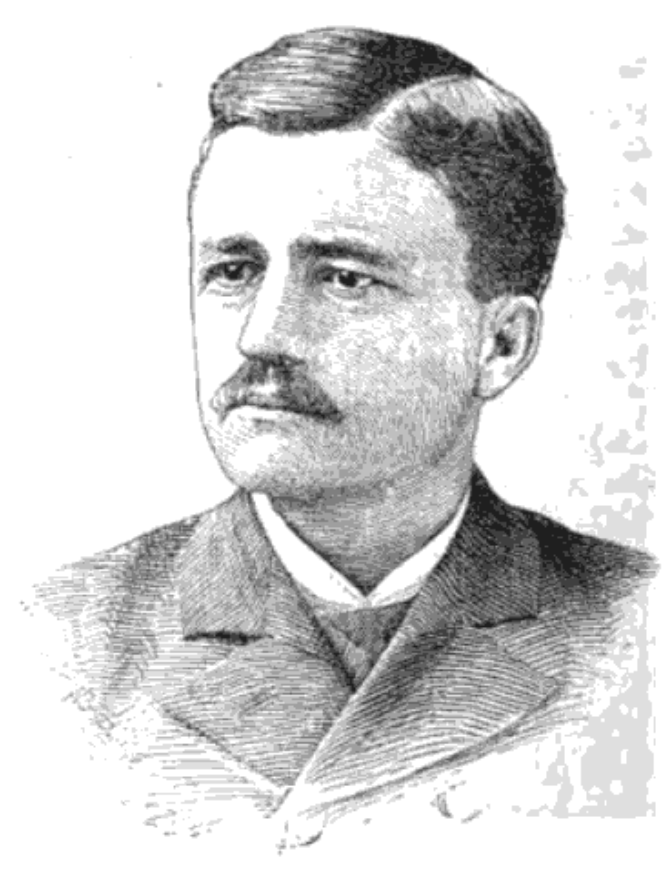
Hoffman in an 1893 publication

Hoffman made two trips to Europe to study sociological problems, and devoted his attention to the promotion of socialism. He was also a national lecturer for the Socialist Party of America. He gave much of his time and attention to the work of the Kansas-Sinaloa Investment Company for which he served as president. It was organized under the laws of the State of Kansas in 1889, with a capital stock of US$100,000. The company served the interests of the Topolobampo colony in Sinaloa, Mexico, an American Georgist utopian socialist intentional community.

He was the founder and for many years president of the Dickinson County Bank, and also founded the Banking Trust Company, and the People's National Bank of Kansas City, Kansas. He retired from active banking business in 1910. In that same year, he became a partner in the Kansas Flour Mills Company.

Hoffman took a prominent part in educational interests and was one of the seven men who succeeded in establishing the Normal College in Enterprise. He came to Fort Scott, Kansas in the summer of 1914 and accepted the presidency of the People's College. He lived in Fort Scott for several months, and then, owing to ill health, retired from the college and returned to Kansas City, Kansas.

== Personal life ==
On January 16, 1873, in Warrenton, he married Catherine America Hopkins, a native of Virginia. They had five children: Ralph, Ernest, Walter, Daisy, and Thaddeus.

He was a charter member of the Odd Fellows' society, of Enterprise, and also belonged to the United Workmen Lodge.

Reputed to be worth a million dollars, Hoffman died of heart trouble at his home in Kansas City, Kansas on July 17, 1915.
