= David Fairchild (California politician) =

American politician

David Fairchild (August 1, 1791 – September 17, 1866) was an American tradesperson and politician. He created newspapers in New York State before moving to California during the Gold Rush. He was an early settler of the Golden State and was elected to the California State legislature in 1860 as a Democrat.

== Early years ==
From the age of 16, he was employed as a printer, with a short break during the War of 1812, when he was stationed at Sackett's Harbor on Lake Ontario. He is known to have established a dozen or so newspapers, among which were The Ovid Bee, Trumansburg Advertiser, Cortland Advocate, Dansville Republican, Trumansburg Gazette, Wayne County Democrat, Chemung Democrat, and the Newark Herald. Fairchild would typically set up a print shop in a community, run the paper for a year or so, sell the newspaper, and then move on to repeat the process somewhere else. His oldest son, Corydon Fairchild, ran The Ovid Bee for over thirty years after his father left.

== California ==
Fairchild helped establish the Ganarga Mining Company, consisting of himself; Dr. Christopher C. Hyde, an experienced chemist as vice president; and Mahlon D. Fairchild, the son of David Fairchild. They left New York in 1849 on the ship Crescent City for Chagresm. Their path took them across the Isthmus to Panama, and then finally on to San Francisco. They arrived on July 26, after traveling for over 4 months.

He and his son returned briefly to New York in 1851 to collect his family and brought them to the West Coast. He and his wife, Deborah Palmer, celebrated their 50th wedding anniversary in December 1863.

David Fairchild was elected a member of the California State Assembly for the 18th District, for the Eleventh Session in 1860–61.

He died in California on September 17, 1866, in Pilot Hill, El Dorado Co., California.
