= Topolobampo (colony) =

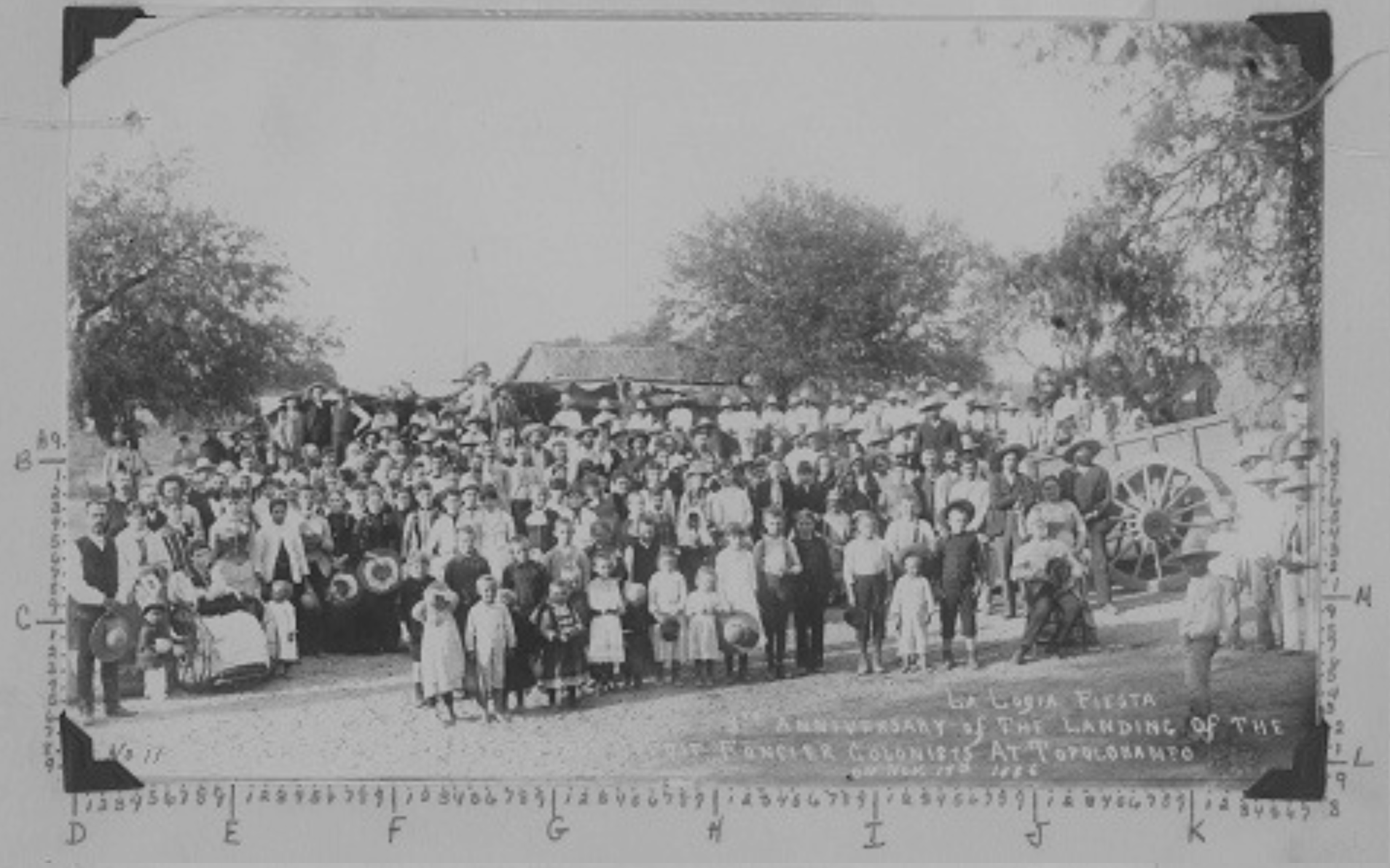
First Anniversary of the Landing of the Foncier Colonists at Topolobampo on Nov. 17, 1886

Topolobampo (trans. "Hidden Water"; referred to as Pacific Colony by the Credit Foncier of Sinaloa; 1886-1896) was an American Georgist utopian socialist intentional community established on November 17, 1886, in what became the city of Topolobampo, Mexico. Located on Mexican soil, it was American in origin, membership, and in leadership. The colony, a social experiment, was launched by Albert Kimsey Owen, (Note: Albert K. Owen was not a relative of Robert Owen, however similar their experiences may have been.) of Chester, Pennsylvania. Of Quaker origin, he was a civil engineer, author and social philosopher.

Owen, in laying out a railroad on the west coast of Mexico for fourteen years laid plans for a giant colonization project. It struck him that here at what would become the city of Topolobampo would be a good place to start a colony away from civilization and away from capitalism. The Topolobampo site offered fertile soil and a wonderful climate. Owen secured a concession for 300,000 acres (120,000 ha) from the Mexican government, and 10,000,000 acres (4,000,000 ha) for a railroad, with other concessions. Owen's plan was to make it a truly intentional community, with all productive wealth and property owned by the Community as a whole.

To carry out the whole scheme, the Credit Foncier of Sinaloa was organized. Its plan was to lay out the "Pacific Colony" at "Pacific City", the City of Peace, on the shores of Topolobampo and Ohuira Bays. The plan drawn was from careful studies of the world's best improved cities and of the requirements of the new civilization to be developed.

Topolobampo was an experiment in community life, swamped by the number of untried colonists who massed themselves in an untried venture. Most accounts of Topolobampo described calamity and desolation, especially during the last years, but other accounts represented that colony life, even in that remote region and under its most trying conditions, still had some attractions and compensations. Lack of funding ultimately led to the colony's failure in 1896.

== Name ==
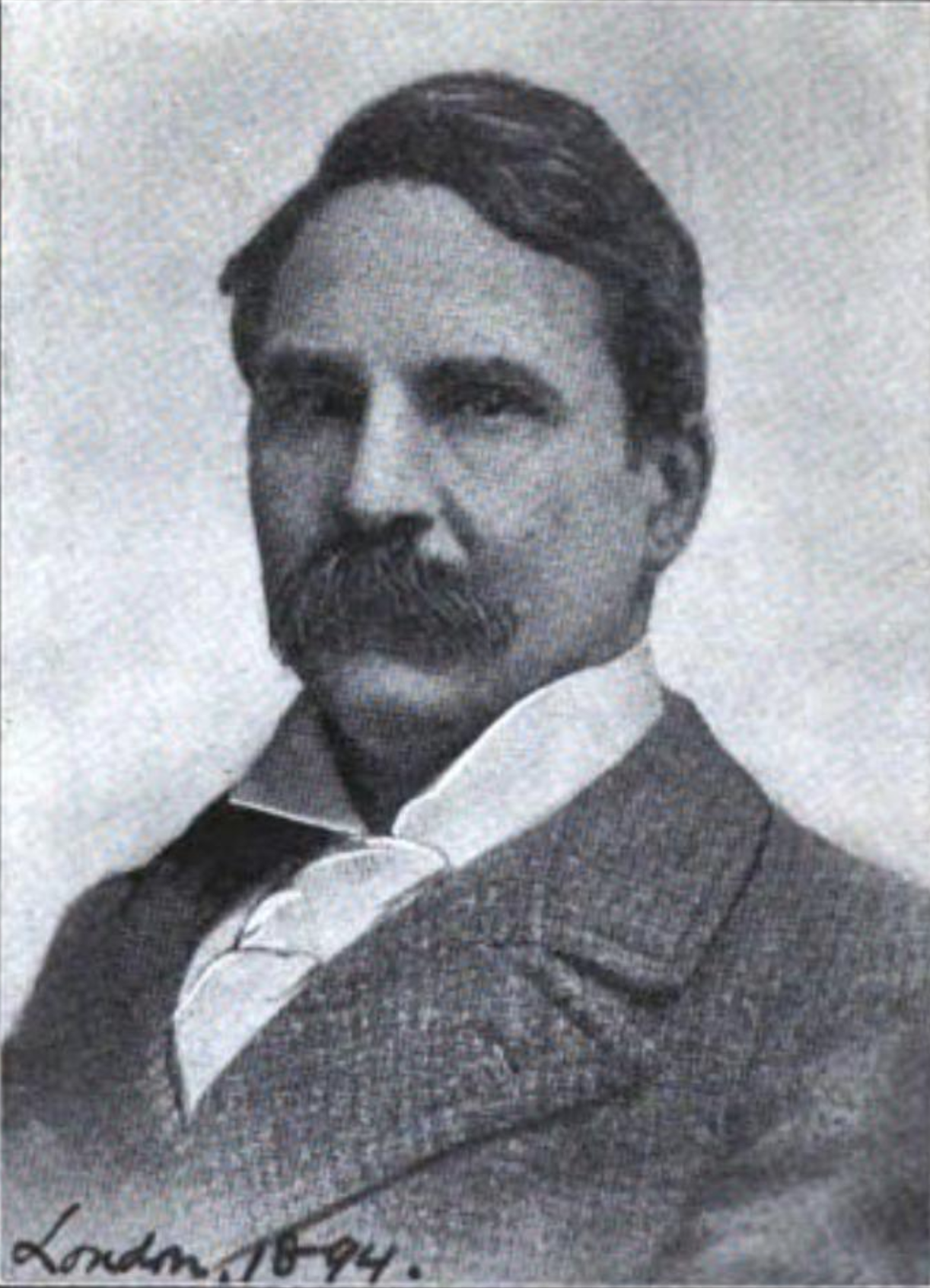
Owen in 1894

The colony at Topolobampo was referred to as "Pacific Colony" in A. K. Owen's The Credit Foncier of Sinaloa: a social study (1885).

== Geography ==
The colony was located in "Pacific City" (later renamed Topolobampo) on Topolobampo bay (a part of the Gulf of California), and in the valley of the Fuerte River, in the western part of the state of Sinaloa, Mexico. It is about 230 miles (370 km) south of Guaymas on the same coast. The latitude of the place is about the same as that of Tampa Bay, Florida, the longitude that of eastern Utah.

The colony was set 30 miles (48 km) or 40 miles (64 km) back from the coast where the colonists could get some land to irrigate without much expense. Its area was equal to that of New York City, one third being devoted to public squares. The colony farm measured 400 acres (160 ha). The land at the bay is rocky and unfit for cultivation.

When more people came in, they formed another settlement on the coast at the harbor. Six members of the colony resided here.

== History ==
=== Planning and background ===
While seeking a suitable terminus on the west coast of Mexico for a trans-continental line of railway, Owen learned that the Native Mexicans knew of a large inland bay of which the Americans had no knowledge. He resolved to solve this mystery. After many days' journey through a tropical wilderness with a single companion he found himself one September evening in a Native Mexican fisherman's camp in the rushes beside the water. In the morning, he discovered a deep and safe channel from this inland sea to the Gulf of California. He decided this would be the site for a great metropolitan city. On that water, then without a sail, ships would come from every nation.

"On this plain will dwell happy families."

His continued explorations disclosed all that he had hoped. The water he had seen was an inland bay connected by a deep strait, 1 mile (1.6 km) in width, with a basin, called in the Native Mexican tongue, Topolobampo ("Hidden Water"). It was surrounded by towering mountains of porphyry, whose peaks guarded its entrance from the gulf and from Ohuira Bay. The climate was excellent. A fertile plain, extending for 25 miles (40 km), and lying well for irrigation, was at hand.

As Owen rode away he resolved that he "would never rest until Topolobampo became a 'household word' among commercial people: until the two republics of North America had utilized its advantages, and it had become a favorite place for the exchange of products and friendship between the peoples of the world." This was in 1872. The next fourteen years were spent by Owen in the elaboration of his plans, in enlisting the interest and co-operation of others, and in negotiations with the Mexican government.

The cooperative colony was organized to carry out the ideals set forth in A. K. Owen's 1885 book entitled Integral Co-operation. There was wide circulation of the book as it pictured the future of cooperation, and the possibilities of this particular location in the State of Sinaloa, Mexico, with its natural deep water harbor on the Gulf of California, its valuable railroad concession from the government of Mexico, its fertile lands, a valuable option on 100,000 acres (40,000 ha), and sundry other attractive features.

=== Beginnings (1886) ===
In 1886, Owen received a concession from the Government of Mexico of 300,000 acres of land and valuable privileges for his Colony, as well as 10,000,000 acres and other generous conditions for a railroad from Topolobampo to Texas, which was to be built in large part by the Colony.

In that same year, twenty-four pioneers left San Francisco to lay the foundations of the colony at Topolobampo. The enthusiasm and interest of the California members exceeded their good judgment. They organized a party, chartered a sailing vessel, and made their way to the colony site. It was an ideal location, but it was absolutely undeveloped and barren at the time. Their food supply soon ran short, and the radical change of climate together with contagion, soon caused sickness and death of a few members of this party.

To finance the huge project, the Credit Foncier of Sinaloa (trans. "credit based on our homes") was chartered under the laws of the state of Colorado in 1886. The company then had a membership roll of 5,000, and a subscribed capital of US$500,000. The company which was to lay out Pacific City and make it a model of the world's best knowledge in city-building. One hundred thousand shares worth US$10 each were issued and sold throughout the world. A share constituted a membership. There were four kinds of investments-Credit Foncier stock, railroad bonds, script, and land certificates. The latter were to pay for the land held by the land-holding company.

To safeguard against such a rush of colonists as swamped Robert Owen's New Harmony experiment when he advertised "for the industrious and well-disposed of all nations," it was stipulated that US$150,000 should first be realized from the sale of stock, and that one hundred pioneers, selected for their ability, intelligence and character, should be sent to Topolobampo to organize the Colony and create suitable conditions for it.

From every state in the union, letters from intensely interested people flooded the New York office of Credit Foncier of Sinaloa and a conference was arranged for all who could be present. The option on the land was satisfactorily adjusted. A favorable letter from President Porfirio Díaz was at hand regarding the railroad concession, and propaganda in the way of a monthly paper was launched. Stock subscriptions soon came in to the amount of US$100,000, and everything indicated an enthusiastic and early beginning of the colony. These were busy days at the colony headquarters in New York and at the branch office in Chicago.

No plans had yet been made at Headquarters for taking care of the colonists on their arrival. Exaggerated reports were soon broadcast by the newspapers glad of an opportunity to knock the so-called "Socialist colony" which it was not.

In October 1886, Owen went to Sinaloa to start the railroad survey and to arrange the necessary preliminaries for bringing out the first colonists. While he was engaged in this work, and cut off from communication with the outside world, some members of the board of directors, without his knowledge and against his wishes, precipitated 500 people upon him. The actual work was to commence when US$150,000 had been realized from sale of stock, and 100 pioneers carefully selected were to do the first work. But when this group arrived, only US$50,000 had been raised. The hundreds of people were unfit, many of them with families. They brought hardships and privations, and intensifyied all of the problems that similar Communities under the best of circumstances must meet. Two thirds of the newcomers were women and children. No provision had been made for them, and there was not even fresh drinking water immediately available. These people landed at Topolobampo on November 17, 1886. They appeared upon the scene, and with it, there was dire confusion.

It was finally arranged to send the first authorized party from Chicago. This party of approximately 25 people including some of the directors and the writer of the propaganda, went from Chicago by railway to Guaymas, and upon arrival at the colony set about creating order out of chaotic conditions. Other unorganized parties from other states continued to arrive at the colony in spite of the strenuous efforts at Headquarters to head them off.

In December 1886, camps were established at Vegaton (a town site of 1,500 acres (610 ha) 38 miles (61 km) from Topolobamp, on the left bank of the Fuerte River), Sufragio (37 miles (60 km) from Los Mochis), and Cahuinahui (17 kilometres (11 mi) north of Los Mochis), adjacent places in Sinaloa's Fuerte valley, with a part of the colonists remaining at the bay. At these camps, the colonists did some gardening and opened a machine shop. This land had been purchased without Owen's authority, and, owing to some flaw in the title, had to be given up after the colonists had resided there about eighteen months.

=== Growth (1887-1892) ===
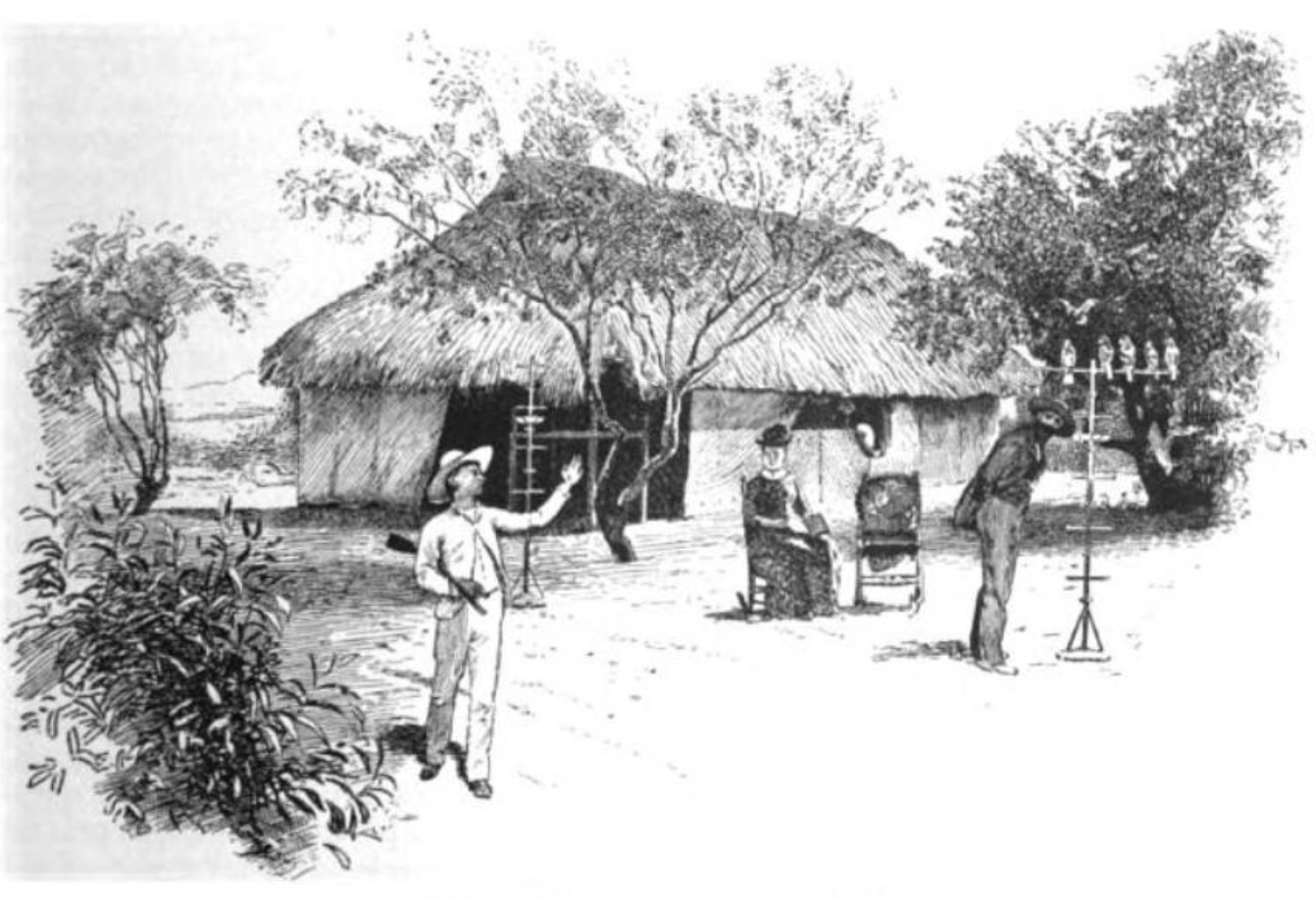
La Logia (1891)

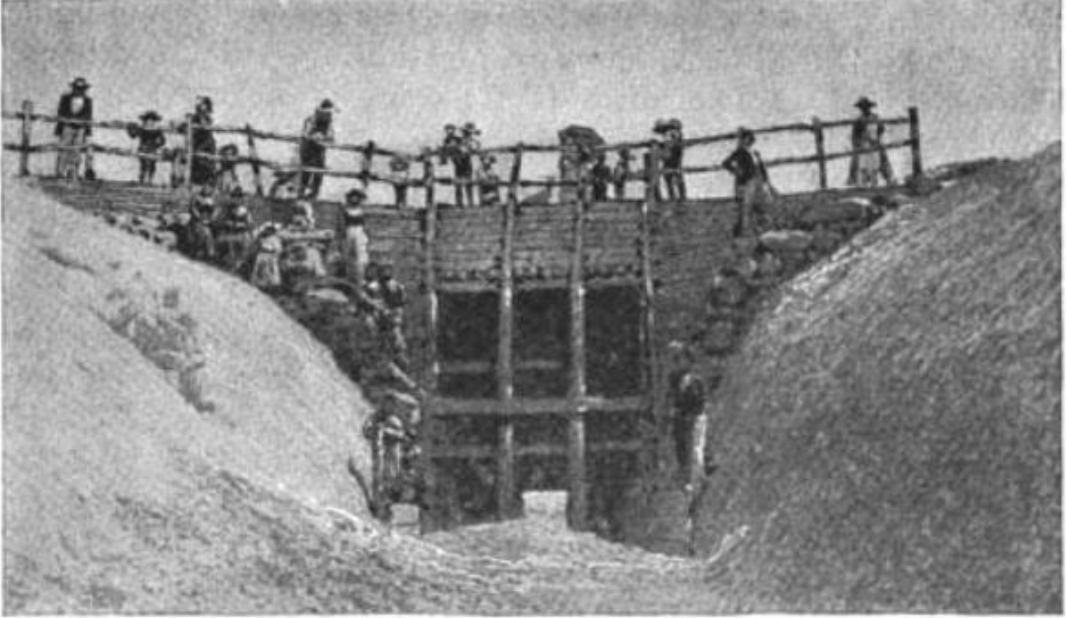
Irrigation ditch headgate

In the autumn of 1887, the Credit Foncier of Sinaloa company purchased a farm at La Logia, about 30 miles (48 km) down the river from Vegaton and about the same distance from Topolobampo bay. There were about 150 people left at this time, and all but a few who remained at the bay moved to La Logia, which became the home of the colony thereafter. This farm of La Logia contained 400 acres (160 ha), half bottom land and half upland. Extensive improvements were made. The greater part of the land was cleared of its heavy growth of mesquite cactus and other trees and shrubs, and 13 acres (5.3 ha) were planted with orange trees. Besides these, there were a large number of fig trees and grape vines, and in the nursery were many thousand more trees and vines of various kinds to be set out the coming year. There was a garden in which all varieties of vegetables grew well. At this point, the colony was now practically self-supporting. While as yet there were no luxuries to be obtained, there was no further danger of suffering from lack of sufficient food.

Owen, in 1888, said: "Those who have subscribed for the stock of the Credit Foncier of Sinaloa company, including their children, number over 5,200. In all 1,421 adults have paid in full or in part for 5,916 shares. These subscribers represent over 200 distinct crafts, and all can read and write." In that year, 132 persons remained in the colony of which 47 were married, 40 adults unmarried, and 45 were minors. Twenty-one of them were at Topolobampo, 72 at La Logia, 12 at El Sufragio, and 27 at Vegaton. They were occupied in agriculture and Alvin J. Wilber was at the head of the colony.

Between 1888 and 1891, colonists occasionally returned to the United States, while others came in and took their places, and the number remained about the same.

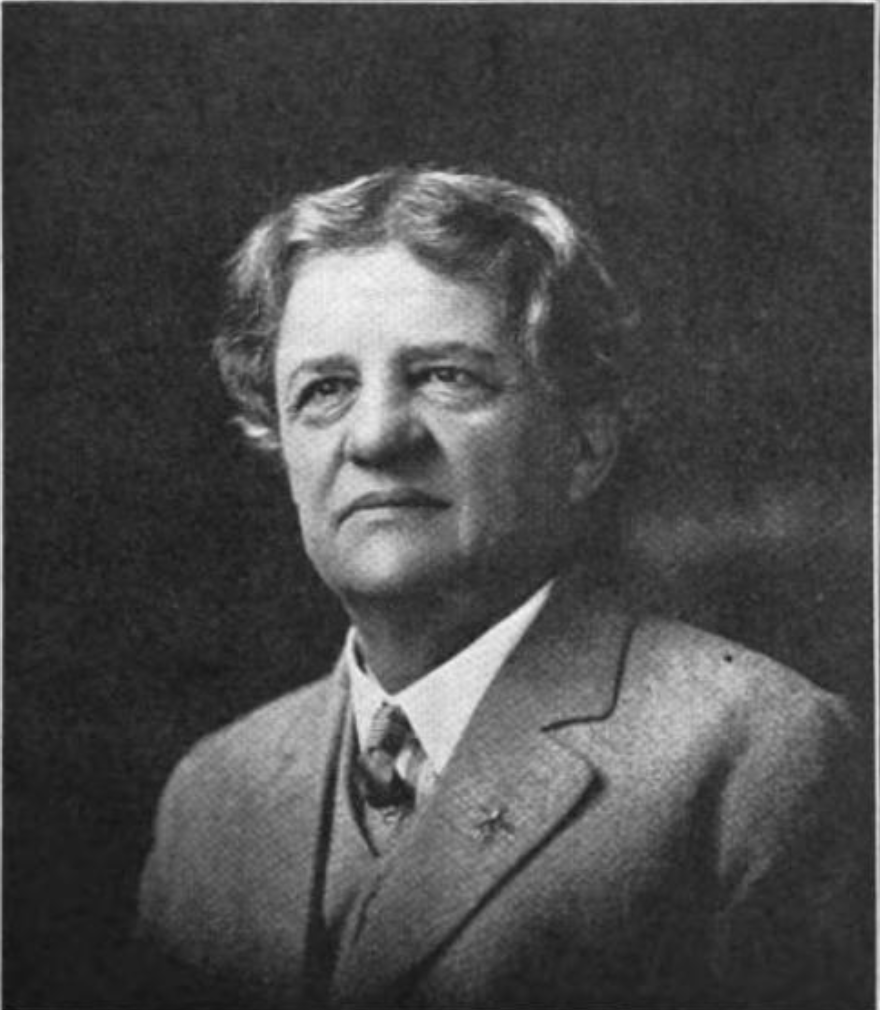
C. B. Hoffman

In November 1890, Christian B. Hoffman, State Senator of Kansas, wealthy miller, and an enthusiast in social reform movements, brought a company of almost 200 colonists to build the irrigation ditch. Their 125 large horses and 40 cows arrived but their goods –thirteen carloads of boxes, trunks, and crates– could not be loaded on the largest of the gulf steamers and would have to come later. In order to secure the lands for co-operation, the Kansas Sinaloa Investment Company was incorporated in Kansas, Hoffman being one of the founders. It was found that inducements had to be offered to those who had means but did not want to go to Sinaloa, in order to raise the necessary funds to buy these lands at low prices. The Kansas-Sinaloa Investment Company offered these inducements: It invested all the money realized from the sale of the stock in Mexican lands, and held them, or such portions as were wanted by The Credit Foncier Company, at prices which were low compared with the intrinsic value of the land or with the speculative price, and yet afforded a good profit to investors. It was of the utmost importance that all the land necessary for the development of integral co-operation would be secured in the near future, otherwise, prices would mount beyond the reach of the laboring classes.

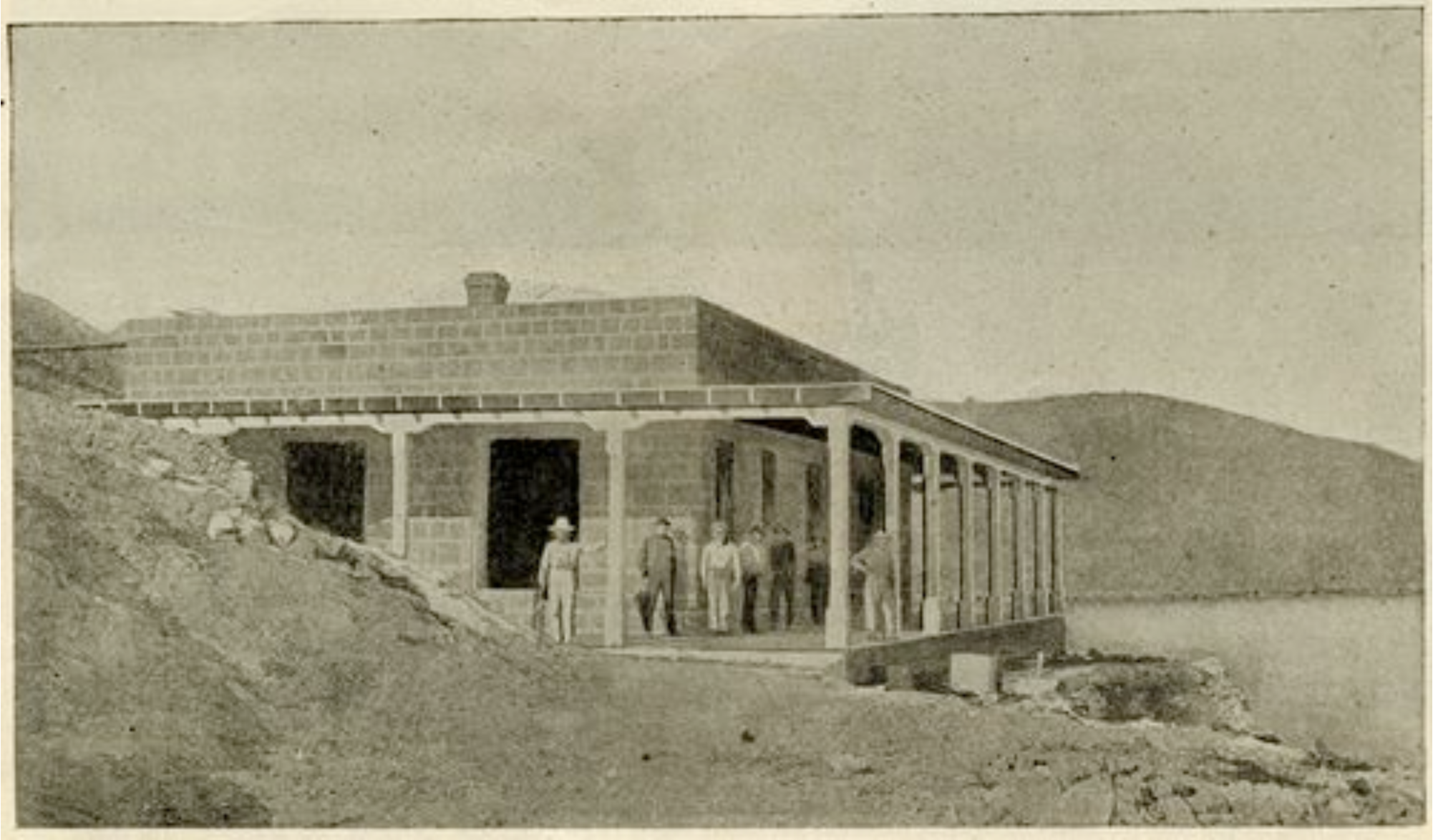
Customhouse

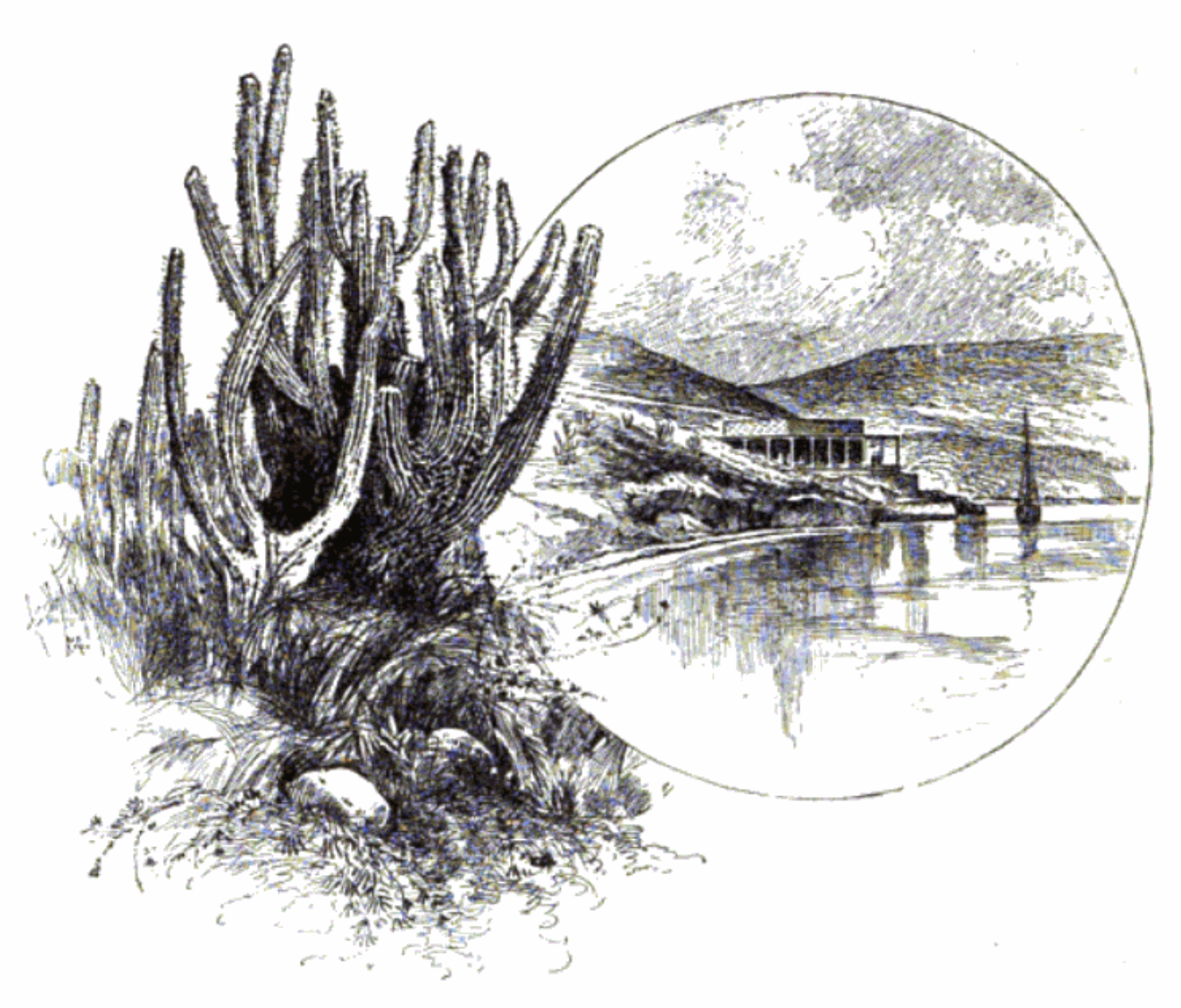
Customhouse, from Topolobampo Bay

Work began on the Ferrocarril Chihuahua al Pacífico at once, but it was slow. The Kansas company took hold of the ditch work and put it through rapidly. In the winter of 1891-92, there was a little work done on the railroad, but the ditch was about half done. A customhouse was being built also, and there was some surveying and clearing land. The garden at the river was enlarged and many vegetables were grown. There were men at work all of the time fishing and gathering in clams, duck eggs, turtles, and so forth.

In 1890, it was rather a study in social communism than of entire co-operation. Under the peculiar circumstances, the colony had made little material progress, though it was self-supporting. It raised farm, garden and orchard products of excellent quality, and in some cases, in ample abundance. Oranges, figs, bananas, grapes, beans, potatoes of both kinds, cabbages, onions, and all the ordinary garden vegetables raised in the North, as well as many tropical products like the papaya and date, were produced.

In 1891, a call was sent out urging all adults with US$25 above expenses of reaching Topolobampo to go at once to Topolobampo, also to invest in Bonds in the Mexican Western Railroad Company, which was a part of the colony project. In February of that year, there were 330 persons in the colony, and it was not long until this number was doubled.

The original concessions granted to the colony were allowed to lapse through non-compliance with the conditions. Owen spent several months in 1891 in Mexico City, and new concessions, more valuable than the old ones, were granted, and all the papers signed. These concessions were divided into two classes, and were spoken of as the Railroad Concessions and the Colony Concessions.

The chief points of the colony concession were that it would survey a belt 60 kilometres (37 mi) in width on each side of the line of railroad in the states of Sinaloa and Sonora, and a belt of half that width through the states of Chihuahua and Coahuiala. This belt was to be divided into three equal zones, one to be granted to the colony in payment for the work of surveying, one to be sold to the colony at government prices, and the third to remain with the government. There were also grants of land near Topolobampo bay and in the islands in the bay. The conditions imposed were that on the lands adjacent to the bay, 500 families would be settled within two years, and 1,500 more families within the ensuing five years. And within two years after the receipt of title to other lands, at least one family had to be settled for every 2,470 acres (1,000 ha) of land. The use of the waters of the Fuerte and Sinaloa rivers for irrigation, manufacturing, and other purposes was granted, as well as, for ten years, the free importation of machinery for agriculture and manufacturing industries, and all household effects; exemption from taxes; and the free exportation of all products.

=== Decline and dissolution (1893-96) ===
The colony became divided, part of it joining a company which had been formed in Kansas. Rival parties intrigued against Owen with the Mexican government, and efforts were made to supplant the Community features with those of capitalism.

In 1893, Michael Flürscheim undertook in the reorganization of the Topolobampo Colony, or rather the intended reorganization, for he did not succeed. He had been urgently invited by both the contending factions to come over to settle their quarrel. He worked out drafts of by-laws and contracts. These were accepted by the representatives of both parties, only to be broken, however, as soon as made, by the founder of the colony, A. K. Owen. His contracts with the Mexican Government were such that without his cooperation peaceful work appeared impossible for years to come, and there was no chance of obtaining this cooperation except on terms that Flürscheim could not accept or advise others to accept.

For all intents and purposes, the colony became defunct in 1893 when A. K. Owen left. He is reported to have said:

"All of my efforts have brought only sorrow upon those I tried to serve most."

The November 1, 1894 issue of Public Opinion stated that the end of the Topolobampo colonization scheme had been announced. The paper of the colony, the Integral Co-operator, had suspended publication. Some of the farmers were moving away and some were arranging to work their holdings individually. About US$1,000,000 had been put into the scheme.

By 1895, the company's scrip was nearly or quite worthless.

A dispatch appearing December 7, 1896 announced the annulment by the Mexican government of the concession granted about ten years earlier to the Topolobampo colony. Changes in the concessions made it impossible to continue the experiment. Lack of funding ultimately led to the colony's failure in 1896.

== Buildings and structures ==
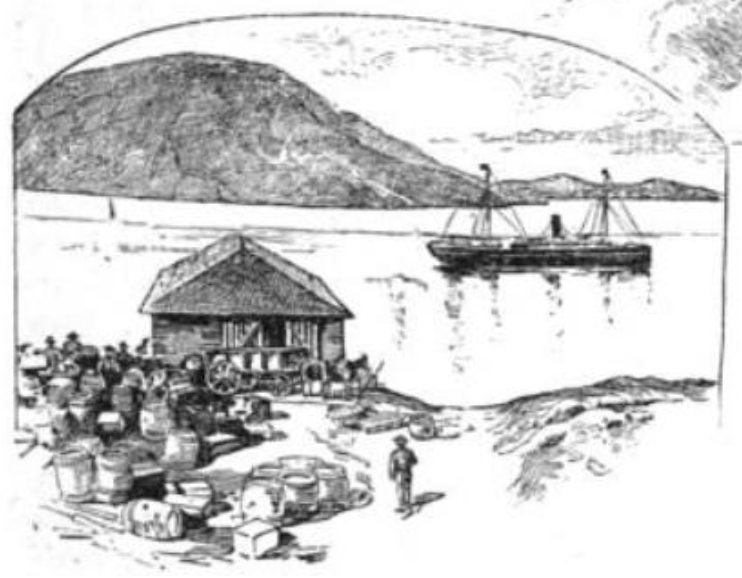
Storehouse and Mount Joshua

A weather-beaten, unpainted, square-looking house which stood on the side of "Hotel Hill," on the opposite side of the strait, was the colony printing office. It was the only printing office to be found within 60 miles (97 km), at least. Here the colony paper was printed. It was also the home of the editors, Edward and Marie Howland.

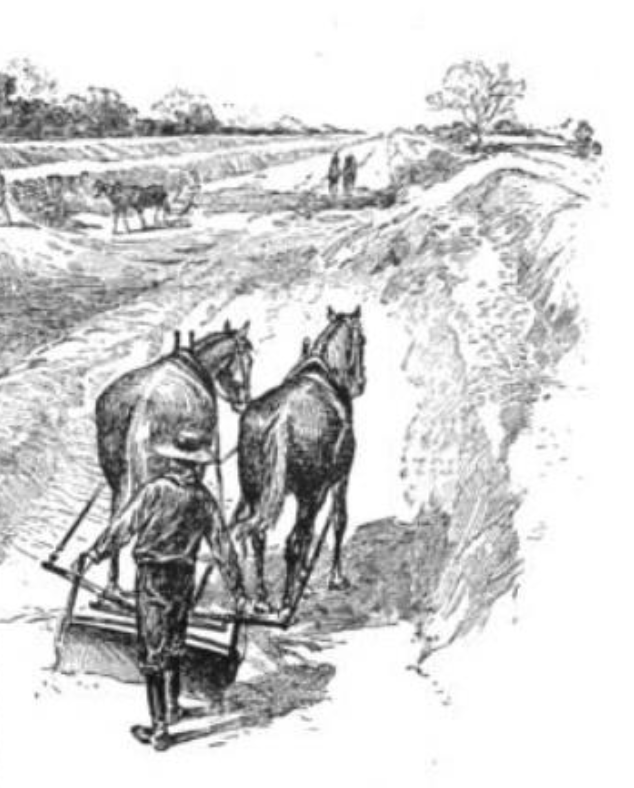
Seventh mile of the irrigation ditch

The colonists built an irrigation canal 8 miles (13 km) long, 100 feet (30 m) wide, and 15 feet (4.6 m) deep, with 8 miles (13 km) of laterals.

A large adobe building for general purposes and industrial uses was constructed. The main immediately remunerative industry was a tinware manufactory.

The largest library in the state was also to be found here. Several hundred volumes were donated by John W. Lovell, the New York publisher, who was an officer of the Topolobampo colony. The library also included the large private collection of Edward and Marie Howland.

== Financial management ==
There were two companies caring for the financial management, the Crédit Foncier Company of Sinaloa, with Owen as president, and the Kansas-Sinaloa Investment Company, which held the lands in trust for the colonists and took upon itself the burden of the business dealings with the outside world. The functions of the Crédit Foncier Company were to a great extent theoretical; of the Kansas-Sinaloa Investment Company, practical.

The "Crédit Foncier" (Foncier in French is manor or home; hence the phrase means credit based upon home or stationary property, in contradistinction to Crédit Mobilier, based on movable property) was a large company. Ten directors, each in charge of a department of public affairs, and 100,000 shares of stock at US$10, each based upon one of the lots into which the site of Pacific City was divided, were part of the outlines. The company held all the real estate in perpetuity, selling to its settlers only the right of occupancy. Shares could not be sold by members except back to the company itself. Officers were elected by vote of stockholders as in any corporation, and all members were to have dealings only with the state. Company scrip, or credits issued for services on the public buildings, canals, and so forth, formed the currency of the colony, and was exchangeable for shares in the company or their equivalent perpetual leases of blocks of ground.

In the summer of 1889, an auxiliary to the Credit Foncier Company was organized in Kansas, known as the Kansas-Sinaloa investment Company. Its object was to buy lands in Sinaloa for the use of its members. Its principles were the same as those of the Credit Foncier Company, and ultimately they were to be merged into one association. The Kansas company purchased one piece of land, known as the Mochis tract, containing 80,000 acres (32,000 ha). Partial payment was made on this tract, and enough of the capital stock of the company had been paid up to pay for it in full. The contract for this land was so made that, in case of failure to make full payments, those already made were not lost but the company received title to such percentage of the land as was paid for. Negotiations for other lands were being made, and the company continued to make purchases. C. B. Hoffman was president of the Kansas company. To his management the financial interests of the colony owed their preservation.

There were many other details of management and usage. The essential feature of management and usage was that everything would be pooled and the affairs of all managed by chosen officers as were the affairs of a corporation, and that each would receive according to his labors and his investment.

In 1893, the contemplated plans for the immediate future was an entire reorganization of the two companies and the formation of a new corporation to hold in trust the lands and make contracts with such parties as wished to reside upon them, preserving the idea of co-operation as originally conceived. The constitution of this company was to be submitted to the colonists for their vote, and upon their action would depend its adoption.

== Organ ==
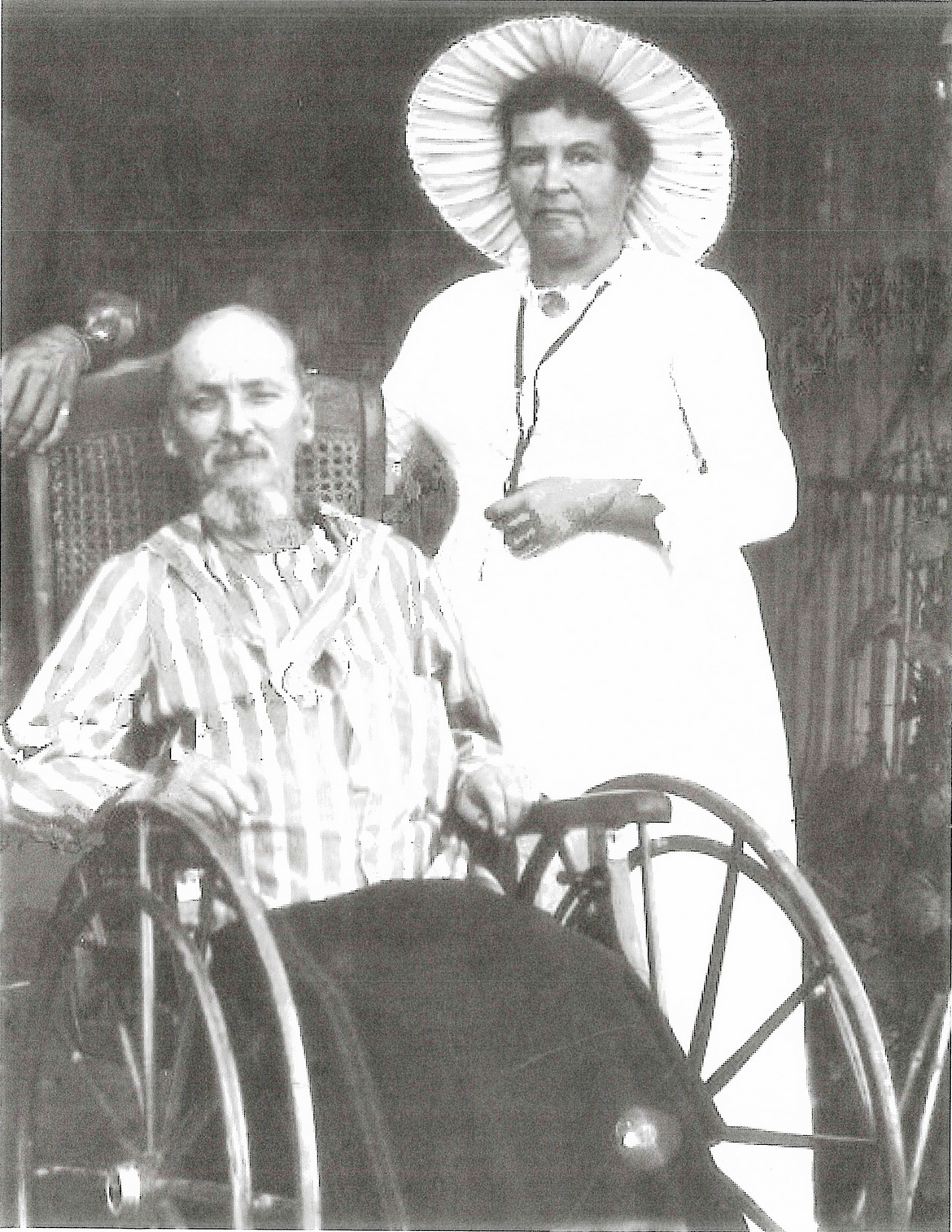
Edward & Marie Howland in Topolobampo colony

Edward and Marie Howland edited the colony organ, The Credit Foncier of Sinaloa. It had for its motto the basic principle of Integral co-operation, viz.: "Collective Ownership and Management for Public Utilities and Conveniences, - the Community Responsible for the Health, Usefulness, Individuality, and Security of Each." The first issue appeared in 1886, and from that time until the summer of 1888, it was published as a weekly at Hammonton, New Jersey. In the summer of 1888, it was discontinued for three months during the removal to Mexico, and the publication was again resumed at Topolobampo, September 15, 1888, after which time it was regularly published as a semi-monthly, managed and edited by Marie Howland, one of the directors of the colony.

Another one of the colony's papers, the Integral Co-operator, ceased publication in 1894.

== Community life ==
Each colonist was expected to work, theoretically, at what he or she was best fitted for and found most agreeable. Practically, this theory could be carried out while there was still pioneer work to do.

The working day was eight hours. The colonists received US$3 a day in credits when they worked for the Credit Foncier of Sinaloa company and US$3 a day in script when they worked on the ditch. The credits and the script would buy the necessary things at the commissary, but luxuries had to be paid for in cash. The colonists voluntarily fell into the habit of resting Sunday, though some worked more or less that day.

Meals were taken at the big kitchen and dining room, payable in credits or script.

People lived in tents and temporary structures. Many lived almost the same as out of doors with nothing but a covering overhead. There was too much exposure and carelessness in the way of living. At times, there was much sickness on account of it. Both the companies and the individuals were to blame for this.

Topolobampo organized a social life. Every week there were public literary exercises. Sometimes an amateur dramatic entertainment was given. At the weekly lyceum, there was music by a well trained orchestra composed of members of the colony, readings, a recitation and song, and a thoughtful scientific address, without notes. There was also a social gathering once a week, where there was music and dancing.

A great deal of attention was given to the education of the children. They occupied such a large place in the thought of the leaders that it might be said that the colony was organized for the especial benefit of the children.

The colonists were characterized as being above the average in intelligence, and mostly belonged to the Liberal point of view.

One of the foremost ideas of the projectors was that they could dispense with churches and religious teachers, with law, courts and lawyers, and that unhampered by the restraints of civilization, they could lead lives of simplicity and purity, and become a prosperous community, every member of which would be a co-partner with all the others.

The company would support no religious society, and none was formed. There were very few professing Christians; more of Deists, Pantheists, Agnostics, and persons with other opinions. Some had come from Quaker communities and inherited those tendencies. A Unitarian publication indicated that the religious attitude and thought of the colony affiliated with the Unitarian church, although there were but few who had ever heard a Unitarian sermon.

During the entire history of the colony, there were no police, jails, nor magistrates. There was no fighting in the courts or the streets. The code of honor in the colony was not feudal but modern. To strike a person under any circumstances was considered a disgrace. Drunkenness was under the same ban. Even the moderate use of tobacco or alcoholic beverages was attended with discredit. Profanity, coarse and indecent language, and gossip were equally unpopular. But one standard of morality between the sexes was recognized.

== Fundamental principles ==
The object of this movement was to accomplish Industrial Freedom on business principles through a joint-stock company, which is to own city, farm, factory, and transportation, and control exchange. Its principles put in practice were: Exact from each according to his ability and giv to each according to his deeds, or needs, as the case may be. Every member must be strictly disciplined according to the iron rule of equity, and of obedience to directors and managers, whom he has a voice in electing from the stockholders. The golden rule of mutuality and interdependence was to govern in all their relations. The end to be attained when the undertaking is accomplished was this: Every child was to be kept at an industrial school and college until twenty, then work at some employment of his choice best suited to his capacity until fifty. Then, it was supposed, everyone would have standing to his credit in the company enough to support him in leisure the rest of his life.

The fundamental principles were based on The Golden Rule. "All land and other natural resources were regarded as the gift of God and the common property of all mankind. All properties and powers created by the people in common were to be held as common property, the individual being entitled only to the product of his labor. Money was regarded only as a symbol representing service, and should have no commodity value. Religion was looked upon as a matter between the individual and his God, with which the State should have no concern whatever. Lands and house lots were held only by lease, and no one was allowed to hold more than he could cultivate. Improvements were private property, and could be sold or willed through the company, but not held out of use, subleased, or rented. Factories, restaurants, hotels, laundries, public halls, theaters, dairies, markets, stores, and the like, as well as the generally recognized public utilities, were to be owned and operated collectively. No firm or legal association was permitted within the company. Free auditoriums were to be furnished for the preaching and teaching of any doctrine the people wished to hear, but no special favor should be shown to any. All service rendered was to be paid for in printed scrip, or receive credit on the books of the company. The banking department of the company was thus a municipal savings bank in which the deposits were services instead of money, so that all business was transacted directly with the department. Business was classified under ten departments, the heads of which constituted the board of directors."

== Inspiration ==
During the anti-Chinese agitation of 1885 and 1886, a Seattle lawyer, named George Venable Smith, became deeply interested and sought to aid those who were trying to rid the country of Chinese laborers. He obtained a pamphlet telling of the successes of the Topolobampo Colony of Mexico, and at once conceived the idea of attempting a similar settlement on the shores of Puget Sound.

== Notable people ==
- Edward Daniels
- Michael Flürscheim
- Christian B. Hoffman
- Marie Howland
- John W. Lovell, Canadian book publisher
- Albert Kimsey Owen
- William Windom

== See also ==
- List of American utopian communities
