= Amy Fairchild =

American historian, Professor of Public Health Ethics

Amy Lauren Fairchild
- Education: Columbia University; University of Texas at Austin
- Scientific career
- Workplaces: Ohio State University; Texas A&M University; Columbia University
- Thesis: Science at the borders : Immigrant medical inspection and defense of the Nation, 1891-1930 (1997)

Amy Lauren Fairchild is an American historian who is a professor at the University of Minnesota- Twin Cities. She is co-director of the World Health Organization Collaborating Center for Bioethics.

== Early life and education ==
Fairchild was an undergraduate student at the University of Texas at Austin. She graduated in 1990, before moving to Columbia University to complete a master's degree in public health. She remained at Columbia for her graduate studies, where she investigates the health of migrants.

== Research and career ==
Fairchild works on public health ethics and policy. After completing her doctoral degree, she was appointed to the faculty of Columbia University. She studied the social forces that impact health inspection of migrants and disease surveillance and privacy. In particular, she was interested in the interplay between surveillance and public health policy. She was responsible for delivering the Department of Public Health history and policy course. She looked at the impacts of fear-based public health campaigns, such as Michael Bloomberg's efforts on tobacco use, obesity and HIV. She argued that banning e-cigarette sales and vaping would have negative impacts on people's health.

After twenty years at Columbia, Fairchild returned to Texas A&M University, where she served as Associate Dean and Vice President for Faculty Affairs. She joined Ohio State University as a professor in the College of Public Health in 2019. Throughout the COVID-19 pandemic, Fairchild was responsible for monitoring health on campus and providing public health advice to the people of Ohio. She called for a national mask mandate to prevent the spread of coronavirus disease.

== Selected publications ==
- Fairchild, Amy Lauren; Ronald Bayer; James Colgrove (2013). "The renormalization of smoking? E-cigarettes and the tobacco "endgame"". The New England Journal of Medicine. 370 (4): 293–295. doi:10.1056/nejmp1313940. PMID 24350902. Wikidata Q54422084.
- Ronald Bayer; Fairchild, Amy Lauren (2004). "The genesis of public health ethics". Bioethics. 18 (6): 473–492. doi:10.1111/j.1467-8519.2004.00412.x. PMID 15580720. Wikidata Q53317309.
- Gostin, Lawrence Oglethorpe; Ronald Bayer; Fairchild, Amy Lauren (2003). "Ethical and legal challenges posed by severe acute respiratory syndrome: implications for the control of severe infectious disease threats". JAMA. 290 (24): 3229–3237. doi:10.1001/jama.290.24.3229. PMID 14693876. Wikidata Q40541337.

=== Books ===
- Fairchild, Amy L. (2007). Searching eyes : privacy, the state, and disease surveillance in America. Ronald Bayer, James Keith Colgrove, Daniel Wolfe. Berkeley: University of California Press. ISBN 978-0-520-94121-2. OCLC 182574130.
- Fairchild, Amy L. (2003). Science at the borders : immigrant medical inspection and the shaping of the modern industrial labor force. Baltimore: Johns Hopkins University Press. ISBN 0-8018-7080-1. OCLC 49699445.
