= Justice Fairchild =

Justice Fairchild may refer to:

- Edward T. Fairchild (judge) (1872–1965), associate justice of the Wisconsin Supreme Court
- Hulbert F. Fairchild (1817–1866), associate justice of the Arkansas Supreme Court
- Thomas E. Fairchild (1912–2007), associate justice of the Wisconsin Supreme Court
