= Fairchild House, Hoxton =

Apartment block in Hoxton, London, England

Coordinates: 51.5295°N 0.0824°W

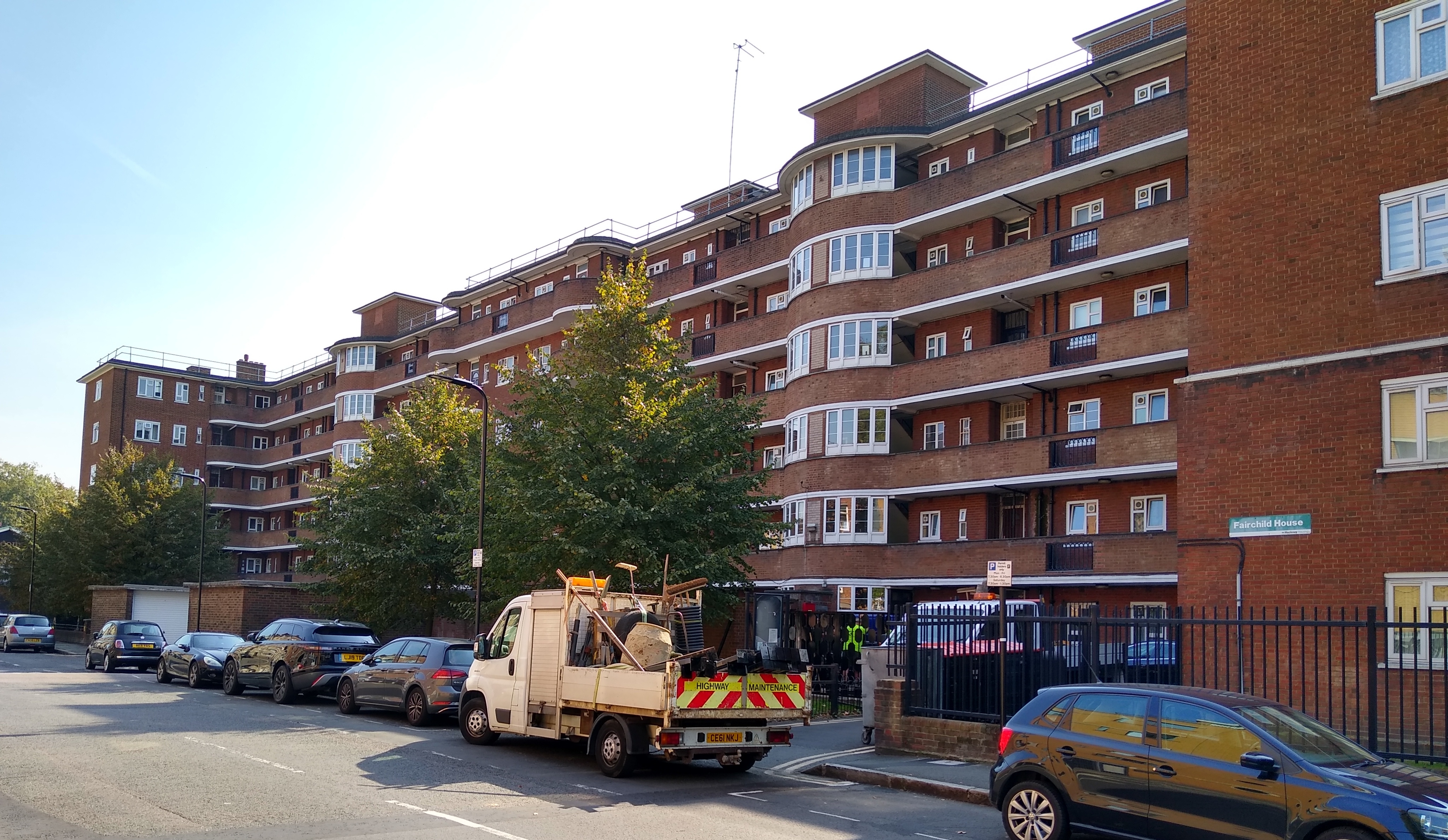
Fairchild House

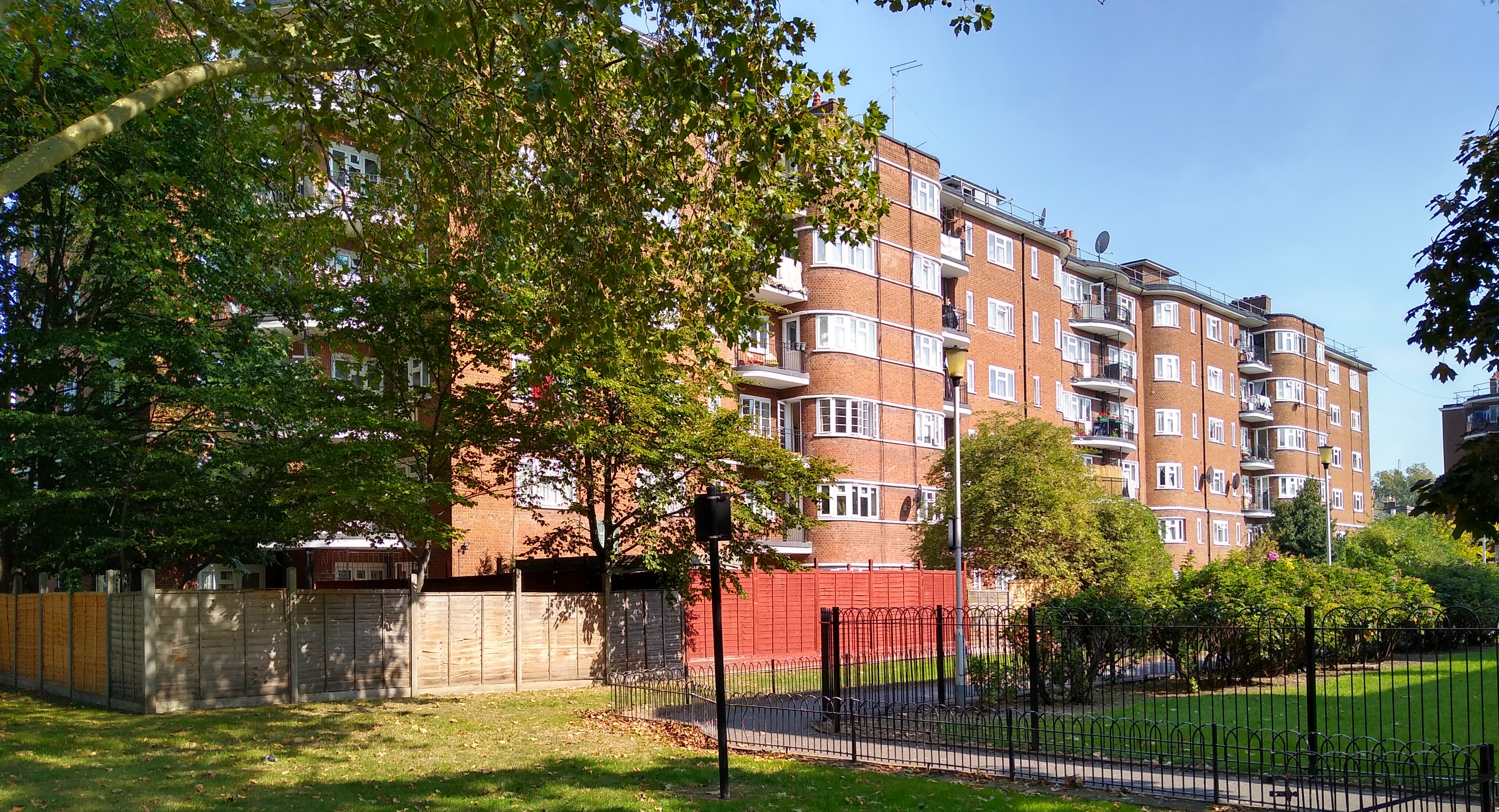
Fairchild House

Fairchild House is a 1950 apartment block on the Pitfield Estate in Hoxton, London. When it was built it was the largest council block that Hackney Council had built to date.

It is a six-storey building of council housing. The Twentieth Century Society notes "the lavish treatment of its Northern elevation". It is a red brick building containing an interesting examples of the Mendelsohn curve of Art Deco, Streamline Moderne architecture.

The building was opened by Aneurin (Nye) Bevan in 1950, the then Labour Minister for Health.

The building is named after Thomas Fairchild a famous historical gardener and botanist who lived in the area in the late 1600s.

The land surrounding the building contains several plague pits, Signs around the estate advertise this with the following wording "Please Keep off the Grass. This is one of the many burial grounds pertaining to the Black Plague 1665-1666".

In 2021 Hackney Council designated Fairchild House as part of the Pitfield Street Conservation area. They said:

Pitfield Street conservation area was designated on 19 July 2021. It’s a linear street with pockets of dense, historically layered urban grain and several landmark listed buildings. The area was first referenced in the 17th century and contains buildings from the Georgian and Victorian eras. It is bounded by large areas of post-war housing set within a townscape where greenery and street trees play an important role.

Fairchild House is named in the appraisal as a "positive building". These are buildings that "positively contribute to the Conservation Area’s overall character and appearance. Demolition of these buildings may be considered to constitute substantial harm. Special attention should be paid towards preserving characteristic architectural details present on these buildings."
