= Grandison Fairchild =

American reformer (1792–1890)

- Born: 1792; Sheffield, Massachusetts
- Died: 1890 (aged 97–98); Brownhelm, Ohio

Grandison Fairchild (1792–1890) was an American reformer. He was active in the founding of Oberlin College.

== Family ==
His sons became presidents of various educational institutions. James was president of Oberlin for a quarter of a century. Henry was president of Berea College at Berea, Kentucky. George was president of Kansas State University. Grandison Fairchild, a devout Christian, once jokingly expressed regret that all of his sons had not become full-time ministers. "They all petered out as college presidents," he is reported to have said.

Grandison and his family settled in the wilderness in Ohio about 1818.

He was born in Sheffield, Massachusetts and died in Brownhelm, Ohio.
