= Fred Rogers Fairchild =

American economist and educator (1877–1966)

- Born: August 5, 1877; Crete, Nebraska, United States
- Died: April 13, 1966 (aged 88); Bridgeport, Connecticut, United States
- Resting place: Leete's Island Cemetery, Guilford, Connecticut

Academic background
- Education: Doane University; Yale University

Academic work
- Discipline: Taxation in the United States

Fred Rogers Fairchild (August 5, 1877 – April 13, 1966) was an American economist and educator.

Fairchild was born in Crete, Nebraska. His father was Arthur Babbitt Fairchild, a descendant of Thomas Fairchild, who settled in New England in 1639. He was a brother of Henry Pratt Fairchild, a sociologist and educator. Fairchild attended Doane College (AB, 1898) in Crete and Yale University (PhD, 1904). He also received an honorary LL.D. from Doane in 1929. Fairchild taught economics at Yale for many years. He was a holder of the Knox Chair of Economics. He was published widely, and his work included well received textbooks.

Fairchild was an honorary member of the National Tax Association, an educational association of taxation experts. His primary field of study was federal taxation in the United States. In a 1920 journal article published in the American Economic Review, Fairchild proposed a restructuring of the post-war U.S. federal taxation system in light of calls for the repeal of the excess profits tax enacted during wartime. He recommended, in order to ensure a "reasonable revenue to the government and justice to the various classes of taxpayers", that corporations be exempt from income taxes and instead that shareholder dividends become subject to the income tax.

== Publications ==
- Understanding our Free Economy, with Thomas J. Shelley. D. Van Nostrand Company, Inc. 1962.
- Economics, MacMillan Company. 1948.
- Elementary Economics: Volume I, with Edgar Stevenson Furniss and Norman Sydney Buck. MacMillan Company. 1927
- Elementary Economics: Volume II, with Edgar Stevenson Furniss and Norman Sydney Buck. MacMillan Company. 1927.
- Essentials of Economics, American book Co. 1931.
- A description of the "New Deal", John Clifford Lecture. MacMillan Company. 1934.
