= National Recreation and Park Association =

American non-profit organization

- Formed: August 14, 1965
- Headquarters: Ashburn, Virginia, U.S.
- Members: 60,000+
- Mission: To advance parks, recreation and environmental conservation efforts that enhance the quality of life for all people.
- Website: http://www.nrpa.org/

The National Recreation and Park Association (NRPA) is a not-for-profit organization focused on utilizing parks and recreation to build strong, vibrant and resilient communities. They invest in and champion the work of professionals in the field to advocate for positive change in service of equity, climate-readiness, and overall health and well-being. Their mission is "to advance parks, recreation, and conservation efforts that enhance the quality of life for all people".

NRPA has a network of more than 60,000 park and recreation professionals and advocates who represent the public spaces in both urban and rural environments. NRPA supports the field of parks and recreation in multiple ways including professional development, advocacy, grants and programs, research, and publications.

== History ==
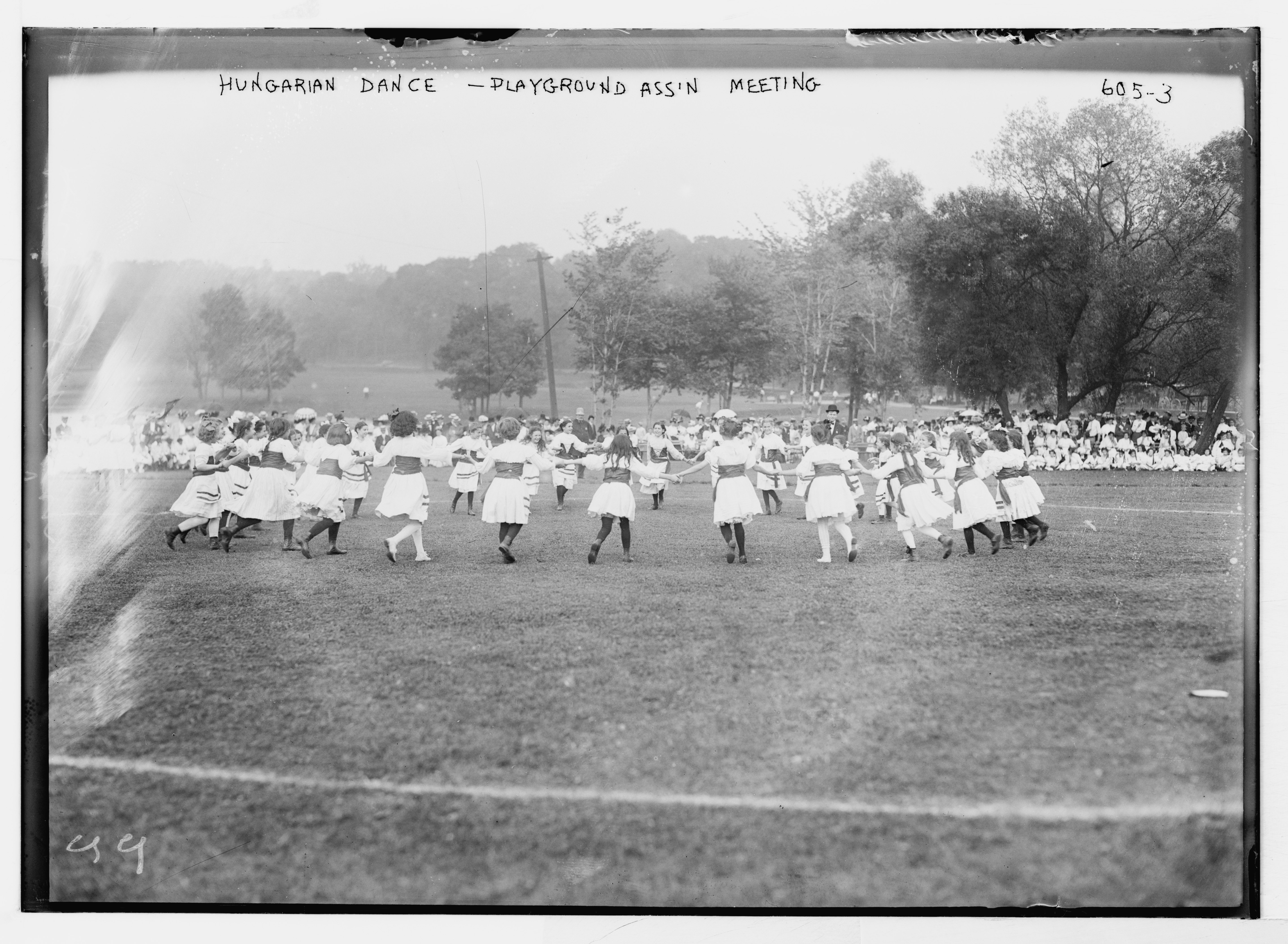
Children in NYC dancing at a meeting of the Playground Association, 1908

In 1906 the Playground Association of America was founded, which later became the National Recreation Association and ultimately the National Recreation and Park Association. The history and heritage of the public park and recreation field is preserved by the Joseph Lee Memorial Library and Archives located in NRPA's headquarters in Ashburn, Virginia.

== Work ==
The National Recreation and Park Association supports providing people with facilities, services, and programs that meet the emotional, social and physical needs. NRPA offers environmental educational programs, and striving for ecologically responsible management. NRPA not only values the community, but it takes a special interest in every individual it affects. It attempts to elevate the quality of life for all citizens of a community by endorsing individual and community wellness. It partners up with many other respected organizations to provide a community with access to healthcare, cultural understanding and economic aid.
