= Herman LeRoy Fairchild =

American educator and geologist (1850–1943)

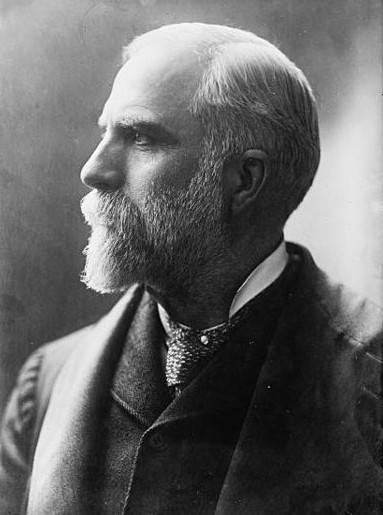
Herman Le Roy Fairchild

Herman Le Roy Fairchild (April 29, 1850 – November 29, 1943) was an American educator and geologist. He was an early proponent of the theory of meteorite impact causing craters such as that of Meteor Crater, Arizona. Fairchild also left his mark on glacial geology. In that field he is best known for having accurately mapped the proglacial lakes of western New York. He did his field work between the 1888 and the early years of the 20th century. He located strand lines (beaches) and erosional surfaces, determined their altitude, and interpolated between them to show the extent of several large bodies of water. A series of lakes was created as the Wisconsinan glaciation ended and ice sheets retreated during the latest Pleistocene and early Holocene epochs. Fairchild discovered several outlets where each lake drained to the east or west.

Fairchild was a descendant of Thomas Fairchild who came to Connecticut from England in 1639.

Fairchild was an alumnus of Cornell University, with a B.S. degree in 1874. He taught at the University of Rochester for many years and founded the geology department there. He co-founded the Geological Society of America (GSA), served as its Secretary from 1891 to 1906 and President from 1912 to 1913.
