= Henry Fairchild =

American educator and abolitionist

Edward Henry Fairchild
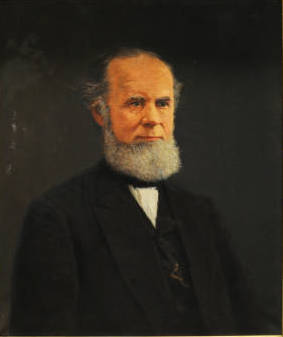
- Edward Henry Fairchild, portrait by Jane E. Bartlett
- Born: 1815; Stockbridge, Massachusetts, United States
- Died: 1889 (aged 73–74)
- Education: Oberlin College, Ohio, United States
- Occupations: Pastor; College principal
- Children: Charles Grandison Fairchild; Edward Henry Fairchild; Julie Marie Fairchild; Arthur Babbitt Fairchild; Eugene Plumb Fairchild
- Father: Grandison Fairchild
- Relatives: James Fairchild (brother); George Fairchild (brother)

Edward Henry Fairchild (1815–1889) was an American educator and abolitionist. He served as principal of Oberlin Academy and as president of Berea College.

== Early years ==
Fairchild was born in Stockbridge, Massachusetts. His father was Grandison Fairchild. When he was a child his family moved to northeast Ohio.

When Oberlin College opened its doors in 1834, Fairchild and his brother, James, entered as freshmen. He graduated in 1838 and continued in the theological course for three years.

== Career ==
Fairchild served as a pastor in Ohio for 22 years. He was the principal at Oberlin Academy for many years.

A member of the antislavery movement, Fairchild was offered the presidency of Berea College in Berea, Kentucky. Berea was a revolutionary college that educated both black and white men and women. Fairchild strongly supported coeducation and the education of blacks. During Fairchild's tenure as president, the physical plant and student body were expanded. African Americans remained about half of the student body.

After his death, his brother, George, who had been president of Kansas State, came to Berea as a professor of English and vice president.

Fairchild's son Charles Grandison Fairchild became a distinguished educator and college president as well. Other children included:

- Edward Henry
- Julia Marie
- Arthur Babbitt
- Eugene Plumb
