= James Fairchild =

American educator and author

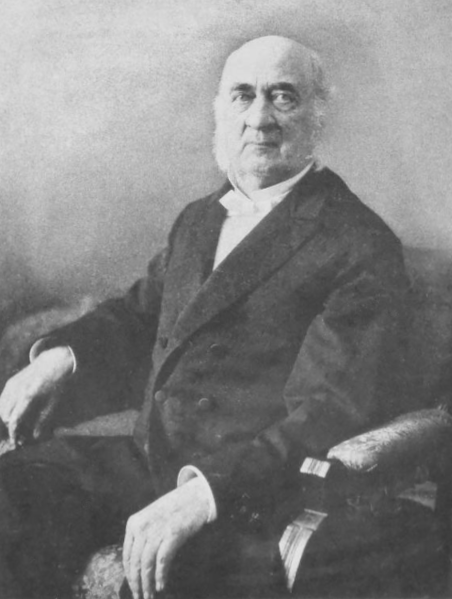

3rd President of Oberlin College
- In office 1866 – 1889
- Preceded by: Charles Grandison Finney
- Succeeded by: William Gay Ballantine

Personal details
- Born: November 25, 1817 Stockbridge, Massachusetts, U.S.
- Died: March 19, 1902 (aged 84) Oberlin, Ohio, U.S.
- Spouse: Mary Fletcher Kellogg
- Education: Oberlin College (BA, 1838)
- Profession: Educator

James Harris Fairchild (1817–1902) was an American educator, author, and third president of Oberlin College.

== Biography ==
Fairchild was born in Stockbridge, Massachusetts, on November 25, 1817. His father was Grandison Fairchild. Two of his brothers were Henry Fairchild and George Fairchild, both of whom became college presidents. Soon after his birth his parents moved to Brownhelm, Lorain County, Ohio, and settled on a farm about ten miles from the present site of Oberlin College.

When Oberlin opened its doors in 1834, Fairchild entered as a freshman. He graduated in 1838. The year after graduation he was appointed tutor in the college, was ordained in 1841, and in 1842 became professor of Latin and Greek. In 1847, he was transferred to the chair of mathematics, and in 1858 to that of theology and moral philosophy.

A committed abolitionist, Fairchild played a role in the famous Oberlin-Wellington Rescue. In September 1858, he hid fugitive slave John Price in his home. A short time later, rescuers took Price to freedom in Canada.

In 1866, Fairchild became the third president of Oberlin College. During his tenure, the faculty and physical plant of the college expanded dramatically. In 1889, he resigned as president but remained as chair of systematic theology. In 1896, Fairchild returned to the Oberlin leadership as acting President, serving until 1898.

Fairchild's wife, Mary Fletcher Kellogg, was one of the first group of four women to be admitted to a college in the United States. She was the only one who didn't graduate, as her father's business failed. Her family moved to a frontier area of Louisiana, and Fairchild, who'd known her while they were students at Oberlin, came down and married her in November 1841.

Fairchild wrote a history of Oberlin, which was published in 1883. He also wrote works on philosophy.

A biography of Fairchild, James Harris Fairchild: or Sixty-Eight Years with a Christian College, was written by Albert Temple Swing and published in 1907.

== Bibliography ==
- The Coeducation of the Sexes, 1867
- Oberlin: The colony and the College, 1833-1883, 1883
- Moral science; or, The philosophy of obligation, revised edition, 1892. First published in 1869 as Moral philosophy; or, The science of obligation.
- Elements of theology, natural and revealed
