= Rose Leary Love =

American educator

- Born: Rose Graham Leary; December 30, 1898; Mecklenburg County, North Carolina, U.S.
- Died: June 2, 1969 (aged 70); Charlotte, North Carolina, U.S.
- Occupation(s): Educator, writer
- Father: John Sinclair Leary
- Relatives: Lewis Sheridan Leary (uncle); Mary Sampson Patterson Leary Langston (aunt)

Rose Graham Leary Love (December 30, 1898 – June 2, 1969) was an American educator and writer. She wrote poems and stories for children, edited a collection of folklore for children, and wrote a memoir of growing up in Brooklyn, a now-lost Black neighborhood of Charlotte, North Carolina.

== Early life and education ==
Leary was from the Brooklyn neighborhood of Charlotte, North Carolina, the daughter of John Sinclair Leary and Nannie Latham Leary. Her father was a lawyer and state legislator, the second Black man admitted to the North Carolina bar during Reconstruction; he was also dean of the law department at Shaw University. Her mother was a teacher. Her uncle Lewis Sheridan Leary worked with abolitionist John Brown, and was killed in the raid at Harpers Ferry; through his widow, Mary Sampson Patterson Leary Langston, she was related to writers Carrie Langston Hughes and Langston Hughes. She graduated from Barber-Scotia Seminary and Johnson C. Smith University. She earned her teaching certificate in 1917.

== Career ==
Love taught at schools in Greensboro and Charlotte from 1925 to 1964. She wrote plays and musicals for her students, and published poetry, stories, and magazine articles. Love's stories "present the healthy and stable lives of children, particularly through farm life, as a means for finding value in the characteristics of Southern black communities." She contributed to The Brownies' Book, a short-lived literary magazine for children. She spent a year teaching in Indonesia while her husband was working there as a technical advisor. She was also a church organist and choir director. She taught summer methods courses for primary school teachers at Livingstone College.

== Publications ==
- Nebraska and His Granny (1936, children's book)
- "A Few Facts About Lewis Sheridan Leary Who Was Killed at Harpers Ferry in John Brown's Raid" (1943)
- "Number Readiness in Grade One" (1954)
- A Collection of Folklore for Children in Elementary School and at Home (1964, edited by Love)
- "The Five Brave Negroes with John Brown at Harper's Ferry" (1964)
- "George Washington Carver: A Boy Who Wished to Know Why" (1967)
- Plum Thickets and Field Daisies (1996, memoir, published posthumously)

== Personal life and legacy ==
Rose Leary married World War I veteran George Bishop Love in 1925; he taught auto mechanics at Tuskegee Institute and North Carolina A&T State College. They had a son, George Leary Love (1937–1995), who was a photographer based in Brazil. Her husband died in 1961, and she died in 1969, at the age of 70, in Charlotte.

Her papers are in the special collections of the Charlotte Mecklenburg Library. The Leary Love Family Papers are in the special collections library at the University of North Carolina at Charlotte. Love's memoir of growing up in Brooklyn, North Carolina, Plum Thickets and Field Daisies, was published posthumously in 1996, after the neighborhood was razed for urban renewal and highway construction. Ruth Sloane's 1996 play, The Second City, commissioned by Theater Charlotte, adapted some material from Love's memoir.
