= Mary Evans Wilson =

American civil rights activist

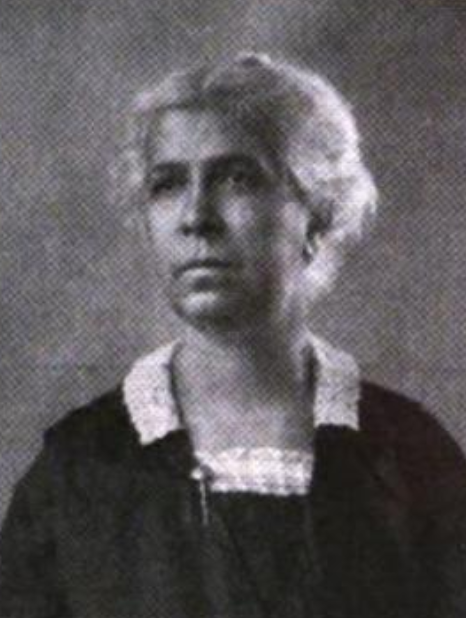
- Mary Evans Wilson, from a 1928 publication
- Born: Mary P. Evans; 1866; Oberlin, Ohio, U.S.
- Died: March 28, 1928 (aged 61–62); South End, Boston, U.S.
- Resting place: Forest Hills Cemetery
- Education: Oberlin College
- Known for: Civil rights activist; Educator
- Spouse: Butler R. Wilson
- Children: 6
- Relatives: Anna Evans Murray, (sister) Daniel Alexander Payne Murray, (brother-in-law) Lillian Evanti, (niece)

Mary Evans Wilson (1866 – March 28, 1928) was one of Boston's leading civil rights activists. She was a founding member of the Boston branch of the National Association for the Advancement of Colored People, and the founder of the Women's Service Club.

== Early life ==
Mary P. Evans was born in Oberlin, Ohio, in 1866. She was the eighth of nine children of Henry Evans, an undertaker and cabinetmaker, and Henrietta Leary Evans. She graduated from Oberlin College.

Evans came from a family of activists. In 1858, her father was one of a group of men who were arrested for attempting to free a runaway slave from a U.S. marshal. The incident became known as the Oberlin–Wellington Rescue. Her uncle, Lewis Sheridan Leary, was killed in John Brown's raid on Harpers Ferry, West Virginia, and her cousin John Anthony Copeland, Jr., was hanged with Brown. Years later, her mother delivered an address at Harpers Ferry at the second annual meeting of the Niagara Movement, a civil rights group founded by W. E. B. Du Bois.

Mary's sister, Anna Evans Murray, was a teacher, civic leader, and early proponent of free kindergarten classes for black children. Anna's husband, Daniel Murray, was a Library of Congress employee whose duties included obtaining copies of African American-authored books for the "Exhibit of Negro Authorship" at the Paris Exposition of 1900.

== Career ==
Evans moved to Washington, D.C., where she taught in the public schools for ten years. She also wrote a health and beauty column for The Woman's Era, an African-American woman's newspaper edited by Josephine St. Pierre Ruffin. On June 27, 1894, she and Butler R. Wilson, a prominent Boston civil rights attorney, were married by the Reverend Francis James Grimké. The couple moved to 13 Rutland Square in Boston's South End, where they raised six children.

In May 1899, Wilson was the keynote speaker at a women's anti-lynching demonstration in Boston's Chickering Hall. In her speech she criticized President William McKinley for failing to address the problem of lynching and called for federal government intervention. Other speakers that day included Julia Ward Howe, Mary C. Leavitt, Alice Freeman Palmer, and Florida Ruffin Ridley.

Wilson and her husband were among the organizers of the Boston branch of the National Association for the Advancement of Colored People (NAACP). They were the most prominent African-American leaders of the organization at a time when its leadership was dominated by whites. Butler Wilson was the branch's first secretary, and joined the national board in 1913; in the 1920s he became branch president. Mary Wilson volunteered as a traveling organizer, recruiting thousands of new members in New York, Ohio and Pennsylvania. In 1916 she led an investigation into discrimination at the New England Sanitarium, and a campaign to persuade Boston's department stores to hire black saleswomen. She also worked to combat discrimination in the Boston school system. Historian Mark Schneider calls her "the unsung heroine of the Boston NAACP."

During World War I she organized a knitting circle of 350 women and girls to provide gloves and scarves for Boston's black soldiers. The knitting club became the Women's Service Club in 1919, a charitable organization which is still in operation at its original headquarters at 464 Massachusetts Avenue in the South End. It is one of Boston's oldest organizations for women of color.

She also served on the advisory board of the Boston Trade School.

== Death and legacy ==
Mary Evans Wilson died at her South End home on March 28, 1928. She is buried next to her husband in the Forest Hills Cemetery.

Wilson is remembered in connection with the Women's Service Club on the Boston Women's Heritage Trail.
