= Daniel Alexander Payne Murray =

American librarian and historian (1852–1925)

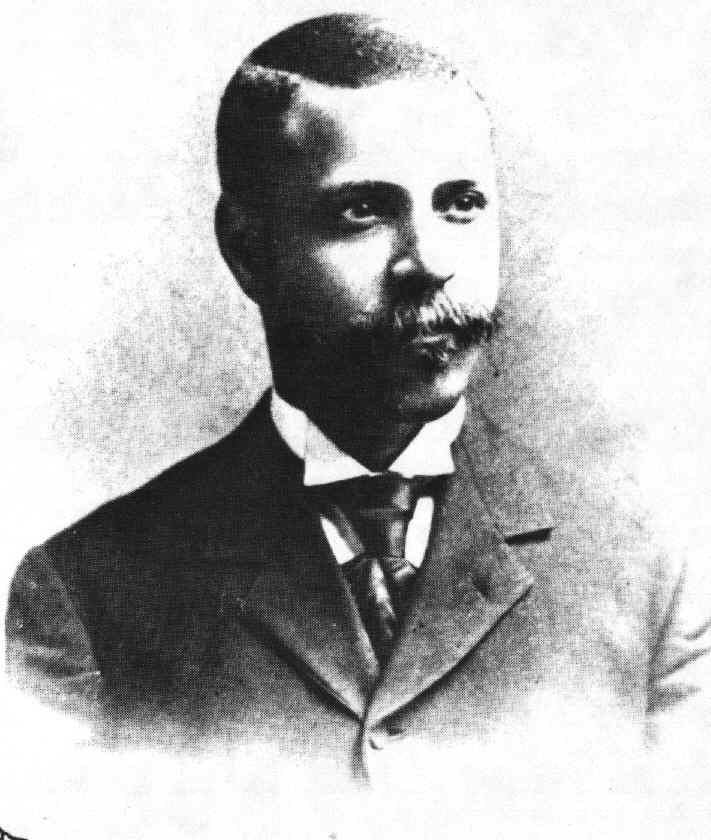
- Born: March 3, 1852; Baltimore, Maryland, US
- Died: December 31, 1925 (aged 73); Washington, DC, US
- Occupation: Assistant librarian at the Library of Congress
- Years active: 1871-1922
- Spouse: Anna Evans Murray
- Relatives: Mary Evans Wilson (sister-in-law); Lillian Evanti (niece)

Daniel Alexander Payne Murray (1852–1925) was an American bibliographer, author, politician, and historian. He also worked as an assistant librarian at the Library of Congress. He compiled information and wrote about African Americans. A member of the Republican Party, he was active in civic and social affairs including participating as a delegate at two Republican National Conventions.

== Biography ==
Murray was born in Baltimore, Maryland, on March 3, 1852 to free parents, George and Eliza Murray. Not much is known about his parents beyond his father being a Methodist preacher and his mother being of Native American descent. As a child, Murray attended both public and private schools, and was taught by prominent African American teachers, such as Alfred Newton Handy and James D. Lynch. He graduated from the Unitarian Seminary in 1869, and went on to study modern languages.

As a young man, he went to work at the United States Senate Restaurant managed by his brother who was also a caterer. He joined the professional staff of the Library of Congress in 1871. He was eighteen years old, and only the second Black American to work for the Library. Murray became the full-time personal assistant to the Librarian of Congress, Ainsworth Rand Spofford in 1874.

In 1879, Murray married Anna Evans, a teacher educated at Oberlin College who was the niece of Lewis Sheridan Leary and cousin of John Anthony Copeland Jr., both of whom participated in John Brown's raid on Harpers Ferry. The Murrays were very prominent in Washington D.C.'s civil and social life. They had seven children together.

By 1881, he was assistant librarian, a position he held for forty-one years. For a brief period in 1897, he was the chief of the periodical division. He was returned to his former post when the other employees did not accept him as their supervisor because he was black. Murray married educator Anna Jane Evans (1858–1955) on April 2, 1879, with whom he had seven children (five lived to adulthood); the couple became a major force in the social and civic life of the District of Columbia.

=== Writings on African Americans ===
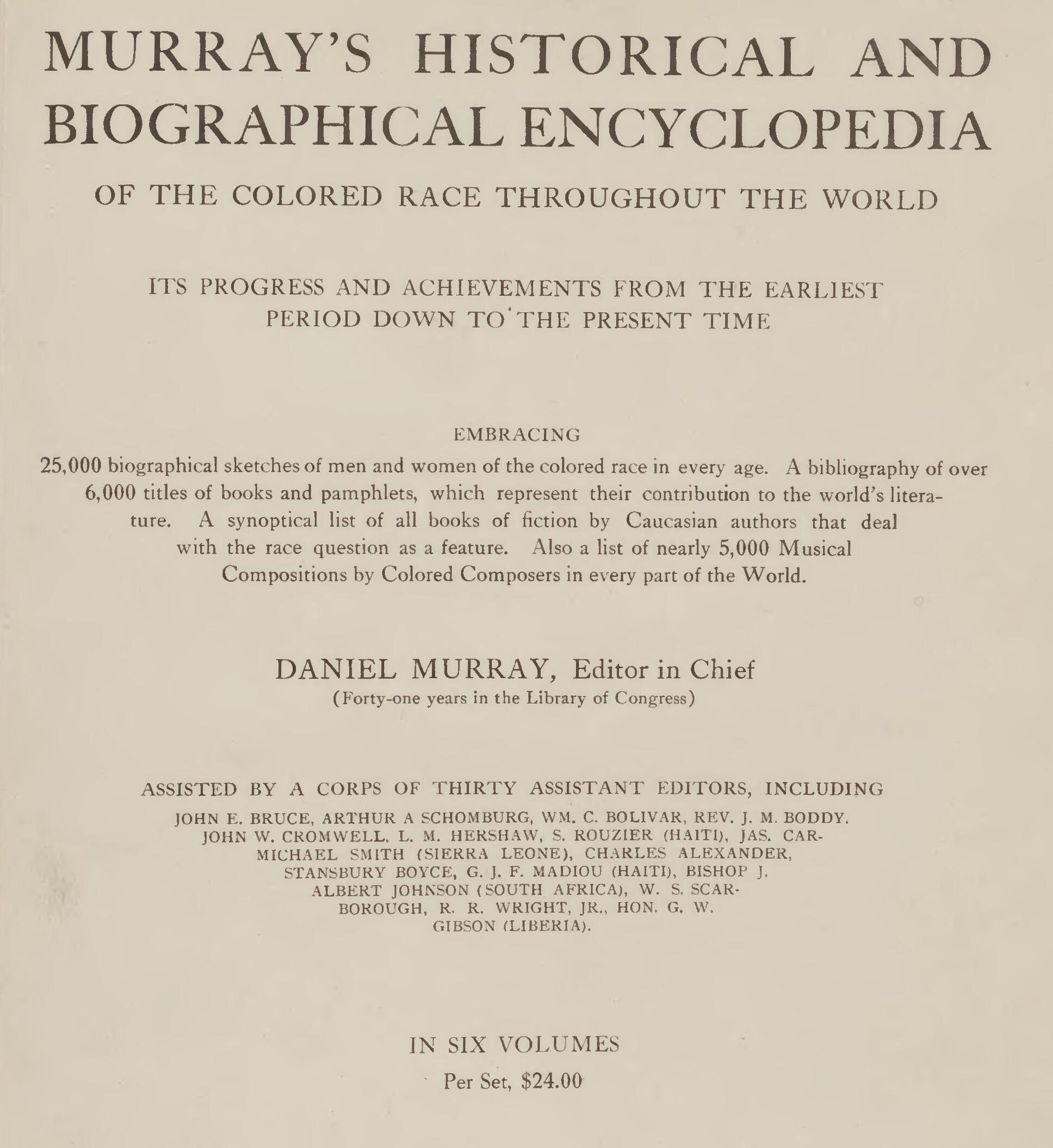
Title page of Murray's planned encyclopedia

Murray began to compile a collection of books and pamphlets authored by African Americans at the request of Herbert Putnam, the successor to Spofford. The collection of work by "Negro Authors" was to be a part of The Exhibit of American Negroes at the 1900 Paris Exposition. In 1900, Murray published a list of the collections' holdings to date and appealed for additions to the list through donations. After several months, his list had grown to eleven hundred titles.

The Library of Congress's "Colored Authors' Collection" originated from his efforts. Now known as the "Daniel A. P. Murray Pamphlet Collection", it contains works dating from 1821 by such authors as Frederick Douglass, Booker T. Washington, Ida B. Wells-Barnett, Benjamin W. Arnett, and Alexander Crummell. Murray planned to expand his collection and create an encyclopedia of African-American achievement, but the project never received sufficient support to become a reality.

Murray's planned encyclopedia was never published, but the smaller pamphlet he composed for the Exhibit at the Paris Exposition was placed in the Library of Congress. This pamphlet, titled, "Preliminary List of Books and Pamphlets by Negro Authors: For Paris Exposition and Library of Congress" became the LOC's first bibliography of African American literature.

=== African American affairs ===
Murray was widely acknowledged as an authority on African-American concerns. He was the first African-American member of the Washington Board of Trade, and he testified before the House of Representatives about Jim Crow laws and the migration of African-Americans from rural locations to urban areas. He was twice a delegate to the Republican National Convention and was a member of many other councils and organizations.

He was also a prolific author and a frequent contributor to African American journals, in particular The Voice of the Negro. He was also well known for his writings on African American history, including his monumental but uncompleted Historical and Biographical Encyclopedia of the Colored Race. Murray's personal library of African American works was bequeathed to the Library of Congress upon his death March 31, 1925.
