= Anna Evans Murray =

- Anna Evans Murray, c. 1876
- Born: Anna Evans; 1857; Oberlin, Ohio, U.S.
- Died: May 5, 1955 (aged 97–98); Washington, D.C., U.S.
- Education: Oberlin College
- Known for: Early childhood education
- Spouse: Daniel Alexander Payne Murray
- Children: 7

Anna Evans Murray (1857–1955) was an American civic leader, educator, and early advocate of free kindergarten and the training of kindergarten teachers. In 1898 she successfully lobbied Congress for the first federal funds for kindergarten classes, and introduced kindergarten to the Washington, D.C. public school system.

== Early life ==
Anna Evans was born in Oberlin, Ohio, in 1857. She was one of eight children of Henry Evans, an African-American undertaker and cabinetmaker, and Henrietta Leary Evans, a woman of French, Black, and theorized Croatan descent. She graduated from Oberlin College in 1876.

Evans came from a family of activists. In 1858, her father was one of a group of men who were arrested for attempting to free a runaway slave from a U.S. marshal. The incident became known as the Oberlin–Wellington Rescue. Her uncle, Lewis Sheridan Leary, was killed in John Brown's raid on Harpers Ferry, West Virginia, and her cousin John Anthony Copeland, Jr., was hanged with Brown. Years later, her mother delivered an address at Harpers Ferry at the second annual meeting of the Niagara Movement, a civil rights group founded by W. E. B. Du Bois.

Her sister, Mary Evans Wilson, was one of Boston's leading civil rights activists. Mary's husband, Butler R. Wilson, was a prominent civil rights attorney and president of the Boston branch of the National Association for the Advancement of Colored People (NAACP).

== Career ==
After college she moved to Washington, D.C., where she taught music at the Lucretia Mott Elementary School and at Howard University. Her experience at the Mott school convinced her of the need for free kindergarten and for special training for kindergarten teachers. Starting in 1895, as chair of the Education Committee of the National League of Colored Women (NLCW), she campaigned for the establishment of free kindergarten classes for black children in Washington D.C. The League established six or seven local kindergartens, and in October 1896, she took over the management of a normal school founded by the NLCW to train kindergarten teachers. In 1898, she successfully lobbied Congress for federal funds to introduce kindergarten classes to the Washington D.C. public school system; it was the first time federal funds had been allocated for kindergarten education.

That same year, she and Sara I. Fleetwood represented the NLCW at the National Congress of Mothers, a convention in Washington D.C. that led to the formation of the Parent-Teacher Association (PTA). At the convention she met the philanthropist Phoebe Hearst, and persuaded her to fund the Kindergarten Training School for five years. In 1906 she again secured federal funding, this time for kindergarten teacher training classes at the Miner Normal School. In the 1900s she directed the kindergarten program at the Colored Settlement House (also known as the Social Settlement), whose leadership included Anna J. Cooper, Francis J. Grimké, and Mary Church Terrell. She became nationally known as an advocate for kindergarten education, and local groups frequently sought her advice.

In 1904 she published an article in the Southern Workman in which she recommended starting the education of children long before the age of six, which was then the legal age for children to start public school. She believed nursery schools should be part of the public school system, and continued to advocate for them throughout her career. She also wrote historical articles and contributed to her husband's Historical and Biographical Encyclopedia of the Colored Race. On March 3, 1913 she was one of less than 100 black women who bravely marched in the Woman's suffrage parade. While in her seventies, she lobbied Congress for a health center to combat tuberculosis, and for land to be converted to playgrounds near two local elementary schools.

She was vice president of the Public School Association, an officer of the Association for Childhood Education, and a member of the NAACP, the Citizens Advisory Committee on Hot Lunches for School Children, the YWCA, and St. Luke's Episcopal Church.

== Personal life ==
In 1879, she married Daniel Alexander Payne Murray, a historian and assistant librarian at the Library of Congress. The couple had seven children, five of whom survived to adulthood, graduated from college, and became successful in their chosen fields. She had twelve grandchildren. She died at her D.C. home on May 5, 1955, at the age of 98.
