= Carrie Langston Hughes =

American writer and actress (1873–1938)

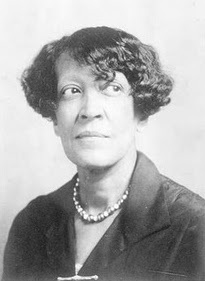
- Born: January 18, 1873
- Died: June 3, 1938 (aged 65)
- Other names: Caroline Langston; Carolyn Hughes; Carolyn Hughes Clark/Clarke; Carrie Clark/Clarke
- Occupations: Writer, actress
- Spouses: James Hughes (m. 1899) Homer Clark
- Children: Langston Hughes
- Parents: Charles Henry Langston; Mary Patterson Leary
- Relatives: John Mercer Langston (uncle)

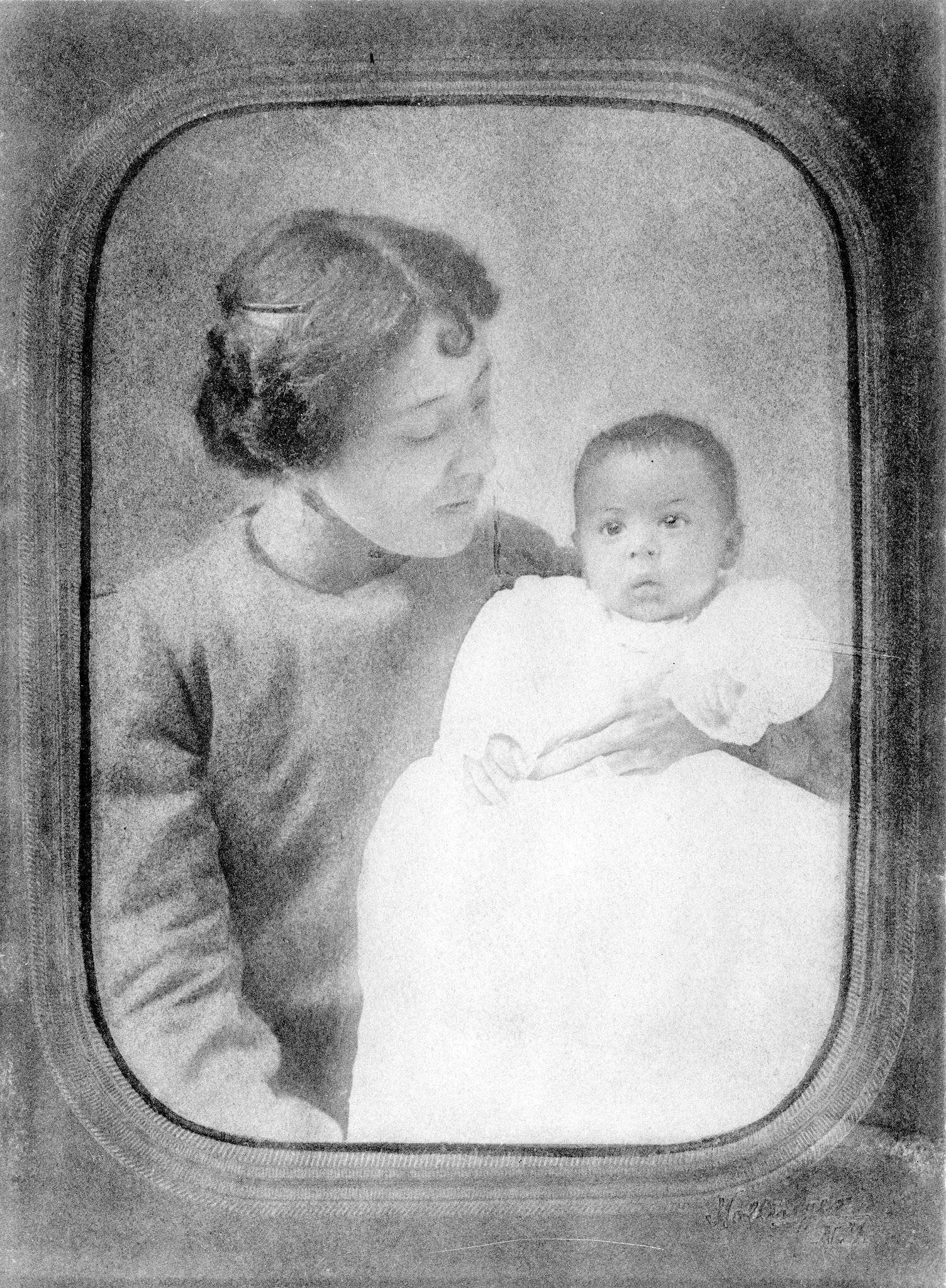
Carrie Langston with son Langston Hughes in 1902.

Carolina Mercer Langston (January 18, 1873 – June 3, 1938) was an American writer and actress. She was the mother of poet, playwright and social activist Langston Hughes.

== Childhood and family background ==
Carolina (Carrie) Mercer Langston was the daughter of Charles Langston and Mary Leary (one of the first black women to attend Oberlin College).

Carrie Langston's father, Charles Henry Langston, was the son of a prosperous Virginia planter and an enslaved woman of American Indian and African descent. An ardent abolitionist and follower of John Brown, he also served as associate editor of the Historic Times (a black community newspaper in Lawrence, Kansas), as president of the local Colored Benevolent Society, and as grandmaster of Lawrence's Black Masonic Fraternity.

Carrie Langston's paternal uncle, John Mercer Langston, was a post-emancipation congressman from Virginia, who later served as Minister to Haiti and Dean of Howard University School of Law.

Mary Leary's first husband, Lewis Sheridan Leary, died in 1859 from injuries incurred aiding John Brown during the Harper's Ferry raid on the federal arsenal. Leary's bloodied bullet-riddled death shroud, sent to Mary Leary as a sign of his death, would become a significant family symbol: grandson Langston Hughes placed it in a New York City Fifth Avenue bank safe deposit box in 1928.

Carrie Langston had a foster brother, Desalines (foster son to Charles); a half-sister, Loise (daughter to Mary by Lewis Sheridan Leary); and a brother, Nathaniel Turner Langston (named for the slave revolt leader). Nathaniel Turner Langston was born in 1870 and killed in a flour-mill accident at the age of 27.

== Social and political significance ==
At the age of 15, Carrie Mercer Langston was a "belle of black society" in Lawrence, Kansas. At 18, she was publicly reading papers she had written, and recited an original poem before the Inter-State Literary Society. She became central to Lawrence's St. Luke's Progressive Club and was elected "Critic" by a rival society at the Warren Street Second Baptist Church. In 1892, The American Citizen newspaper dubbed Carrie Langston and three others as "the most beautiful colored girls in Kansas".

Langston wrote for The Atchison Blade, a family-operated African-American newspaper published in Atchison, Kansas. In 1892, writing as a young, single, black woman, she refuted what she termed "the male notion" that women were content with their position in life. Her writing was influenced by her father and his support of the 1867 Kansas suffrage referendum. Her words were aimed at Midwestern black men who maintained conservative ideas about women's place in society. She especially encouraged the participation of Black women in politics. She spoke publicly on women in journalism, addressed African Methodist Episcopal Church conventions, and served as deputy clerk in a district court office.

== Personal life ==
Carrie Langston's first marriage was to James Hughes, a descendant of two prominent white grandfathers from Kentucky and two grandmothers of African descent. The couple eloped on April 30, 1899, in Guthrie, Oklahoma, with neither friends nor family attending the wedding ceremony. Rumors spread that Carrie Langston had become pregnant before their marriage, though she may have become pregnant within days of the wedding. The couple moved to Joplin, Missouri, where James Hughes began working as a stenographer and Carrie Langston Hughes experienced a miscarriage.

From Joplin, the couple moved to Buffalo, New York, with plans to move to Cuba. Carrie Langston Hughes learned she was pregnant again and returned to Joplin. However, James Hughes, seeking to escape racial segregation in the United States, moved to Mexico, where he spent most of the rest of his life, becoming fairly prosperous. Carrie gave birth on February 1, 1902, to James Mercer Langston Hughes in Joplin, Missouri. When Langston was five years old, Carrie took him to Mexico to meet his father. While there, Mexico was struck by the historic earthquake on April 14, 1907. That event prompted Carrie Langston Hughes to return to the United States with her son; young Langston Hughes witnessed prayer and wreckage there from his father's shoulders impacting him for the rest of his life, as evidenced in his later writing.

Carrie and Langston Hughes returned to Lawrence, where Hughes left her son in the care of her mother (now aged about 70) while she moved to Topeka. She returned several months later to take her son to Topeka, planning to enroll him in the Harrison Street School. The principal of the school, Eli S. Foster, demanded that Langston attend the more-distant colored children's Washington School. Carrie Langston Hughes claimed her young son could not walk that distance daily but she still met resistance; she took her case to the Topeka Board of Education and won. But before the end of the school year, Langston was back with his grandmother in Lawrence. Almost fifty years later, a federal lawsuit regarding the same school board resulted in a Supreme Court decision that ended school segregation in the United States.

Carrie Langston Hughes called herself different names throughout her life; these names included Caroline Langston, Carolyn Hughes, Carolyn Hughes Clark sometimes spelled Clarke (referring to her having wed Homer Clark following the divorce from Langston's father), and Carrie Clark or Clarke. She also lived many places with and without her son while he was growing up. As a result, Langston Hughes was raised for the most part by Carrie Langston's mother, Mary Leary, in Lawrence, Kansas with his mother making occasional visits.

Carrie Langston's peripatetic life was driven by job searches and boredom. The deaths of her parents (Charles Langston died in 1892; Mary Leary died on April 8, 1915) left her bereft of both the political privileges they had provided and the social consciousness they had instilled in her. Her second husband, Homer Clark, had a son from a previous relationship named Gwyn Shannon Clark (b. September 24, 1913), who accompanied Carrie Langston through most of the rest of her adult life.

In March 1933, Carrie Langston's lifelong wish to be an actress of some success was fulfilled: she appeared on Broadway as Sister Susie May Hunt in Hall Johnson's theatrical production, Run, Little Chillun.

James Nathaniel Hughes, Langston Hughes's father, died on October 22, 1934, of complications from several strokes; neither Carrie Langston nor Langston Hughes were mentioned in his will.

On May 14, 1935, in a letter to Langston Hughes, who was living in Mexico, Carrie Langston wrote of "a very bad blood tumor" on her breast; on June 3, 1938, Carrie Langston died of breast cancer.

Carrie Langston counted among her friends Zora Neale Hurston.

== Commemoration ==
A painting by Phyllis Garibay-Coon depicting her and other Kansas suffragists was unveiled at the Kansas Statehouse in January 2025. It is titled "Rebel Women" and is the first art installation by any woman artist to be in the Kansas Statehouse.
