= Brooklyn (Charlotte, North Carolina) =

Coordinates: 35.223°N 80.842°W

Brooklyn was a largely African American section of Charlotte, North Carolina. It was home to many businesses, residences, and churches. The neighborhood was demolished for an urban renewal project in the 1960s and is now part of what is known as the Second Ward.

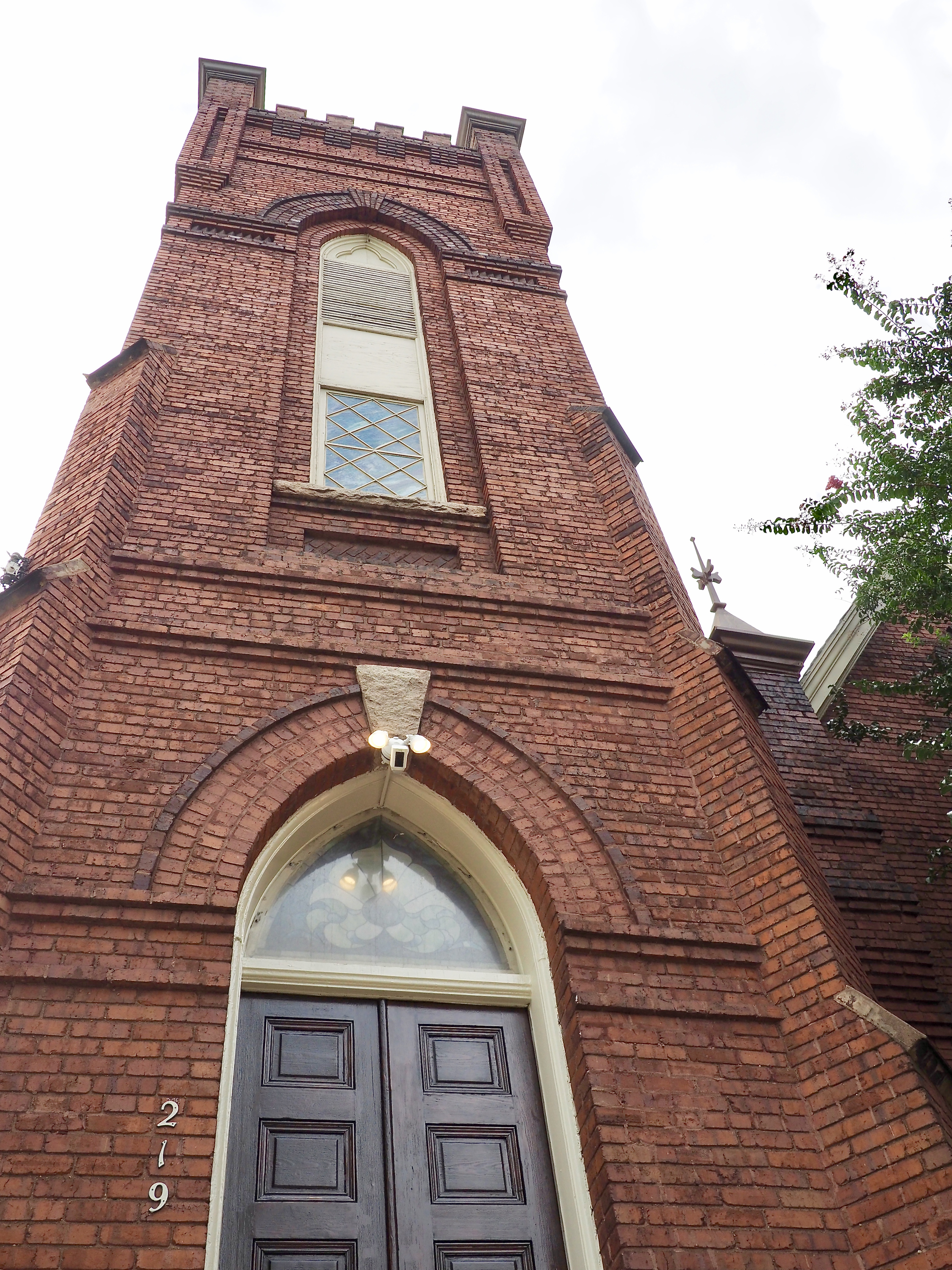
Tower at the Old Grace A. M. E. Zion Church

Originally known as Logtown, the area grew after the American Civil War as freed slaves settled in urban areas. It developed commerce, was home to fine residences of Charlotte's prosperous and prominent African Americans as well as shanties. It was home to Charlotte's first school for African Americans, the Myers Street School, which closed in 1907. A new high school was built in 1923 called Charlotte Colored High School. It was Charlotte's only high school open to African American students and became known as Second Ward High School after a few years. It closed in 1969 in the wake of integration as African American schools were closed across the South and the students were bussed to white schools. The Brooklyn area also had a YMCA, a library, the A.M.E. Zion Publishing House, numerous churches, and the Queen City Drug Store. The area was razed in the 1960s and replaced by a government and commercial building project that forced out its residents.

The Swank Social Club was established on the site of the former Second Ward High School.

== In popular culture ==
Rose Leary Love wrote the memoir Plum Thickets and Field Daisies about growing up in Brooklyn.

== Legacy ==
The Old Grace A.M.E. Zion Church and the Second Ward Gym are a couple of the few remaining buildings that still remains as reminders of the former neighborhood. In 2009, the Harvey B. Gantt Center for African-American Arts + Culture opened in Second Ward, named after Harvey Gantt, architect and first black Mayor of Charlotte. In 2019, the Levine Museum of the New South held an exhibit about the community. That same year, it was announced of a new mixed-use development, called Brooklyn Village, be built in Second Ward; the name pays homage to the former neighborhood. In 2022, Stonewall Street was renamed "Brooklyn Village Avenue" in relation to the new development; Stonewall station was also renamed Brooklyn Village station in conjunction to the road name change.

== See also ==
- Biddleville
- Brooklyn Village (Charlotte)
