= David Jenkins =

David Jenkins may refer to:

== Entertainment ==
- David Jenkins (composer) (1848–1915), Welsh composer
- David Jenkins (musician) (born 1947), singer for the band Pablo Cruise
- David Jenkins (television writer) (born 1981), creator of People of Earth

== Politics ==
- David Jenkins (North Carolina), 18th Century North Carolina politician, delegate at the First North Carolina Provincial Congress
- David Jenkins (abolitionist) (1811–1876), Mississippi politician and abolitionist
- David A. Jenkins (1822–1886), North Carolina State Treasurer, 1868–1876
- David James Jenkins (1824–1891), British MP for Penryn and Falmouth, 1874–1885
- David Jenkins (Georgia politician) (born 1971), American politician from Georgia

== Religion ==
- David Jenkins (bishop) (1925–2016), of Durham
- David Jenkins (Archdeacon of Westmorland and Furness) (1929–2014), Anglican priest
- David Jenkins (archdeacon of Sudbury) (born 1961), Anglican priest

== Sports ==
- David Morgan Jenkins (1901–1968), rugby union and rugby league footballer for Wales
- David Jenkins (rugby, born 1904) (1904–1951), rugby union and rugby league footballer for Wales
- David Jenkins (rugby, born 1914) (1914–1979), rugby union and rugby league footballer for Cardiff
- David Jenkins (figure skater) (born 1936), American figure skater
- David Jenkins (footballer) (born 1946), English footballer for Arsenal and Tottenham Hotspur
- David Jenkins (sprinter) (born 1952), Scottish athlete
- Ab Jenkins (1883–1956), American racing car driver

== Other ==
- David Jenkins (Royalist) (1582–1663), Welsh judge and Royalist during the English Civil War
- David P. Jenkins (1823–1915), American Civil War colonel
- David Jenkins, Baron Jenkins (1899–1969), British Law Lord
- David Jenkins (librarian) (1912–2002), Welsh librarian
- David Jenkins (British Army officer) (born 1945), British Army major general
- David J. Jenkins (born 1942), professor of nutrition at the University of Toronto
