= Amos Drane =

American politician

Amos Drane (born 1811 or 1812 - ?) was a delegate to Mississippi's 1868 Constitutional Convention representing Madison County, Alabama. He was one of 16 African American delegates at the constitutional convemtion.

According to a newspaper brief, he had been owned as a slave by Maj. Drane. It states Alfred Handy, a state legislator, was his half-brother.

Eric Foner documents him per Richard L. Hume as owning substantial property and advocating for a National Union Republican party. He was opposed to restrictions on Confederates voting.

He was a candidate for the Mississippi House of Representatives.

In 1871, he was one of the incorporators of the Wesley Chapel Methodist Episcopal Church.

Testimony about election issues included a report that a mob attacked him for asking questions of a Captain Pratt at a courthouse meeting and the sheriff took him into custody to safeguard him.

Drane was part of the "Black and Tan" convention held in Jackson, Mississippi in January 1868. It was disparaged by Democrat and Confederate aligned newspaper accounts.

He and other Republican politicians were lampooned and disparaged in the Panola Star newspaper.

== See also ==
- African American officeholders from the end of the Civil War until before 1900
