= Brooklyn Village (Charlotte) =

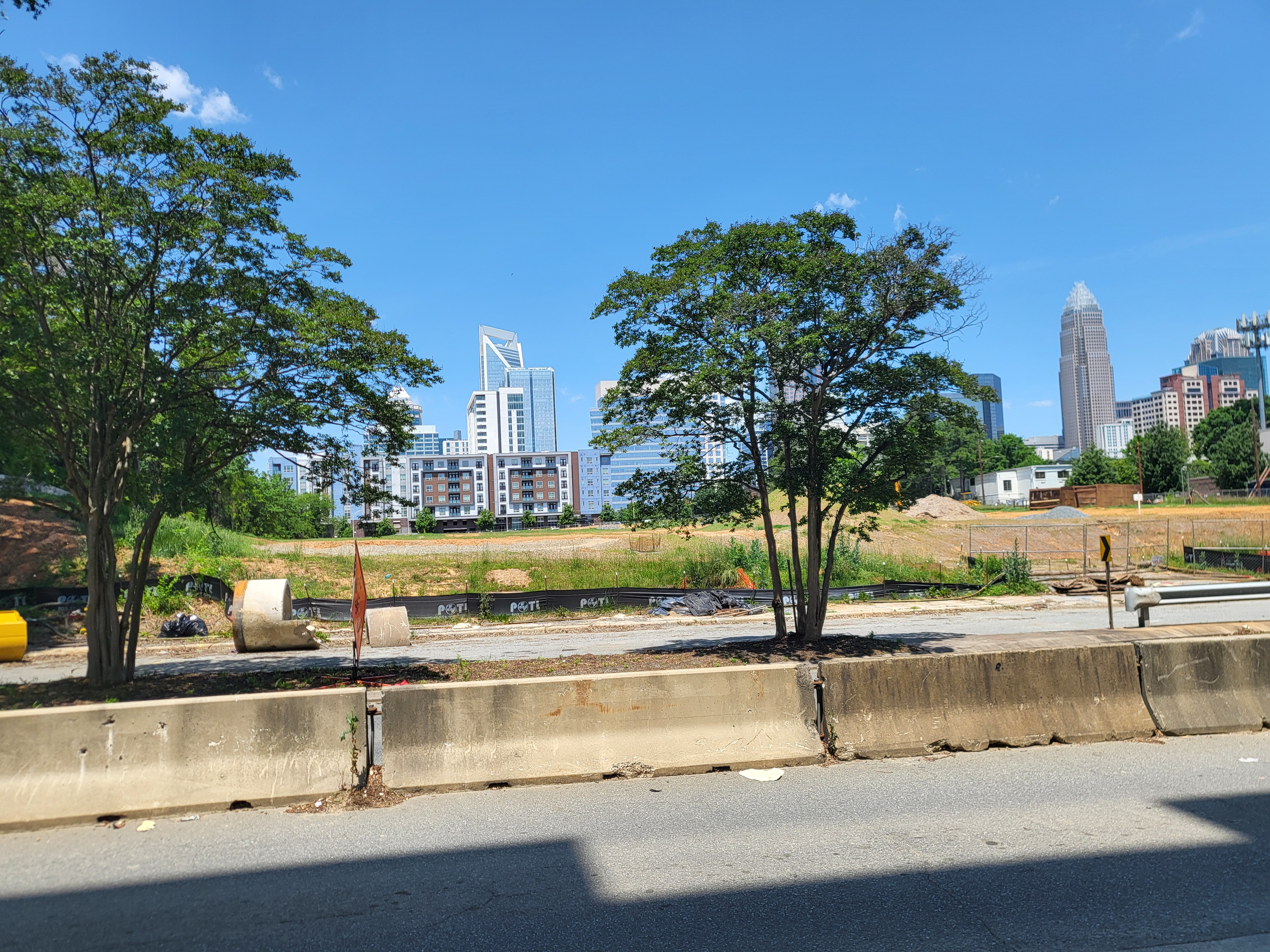
- The site of Phase 1 in May 2024, after Bob Walton Plaza was demolished.
- Location: Uptown Charlotte, Charlotte, NC
- Status: Proposed
- Groundbreaking: Fall 2023
- Estimated completion: 2035

Companies
- Developer: BK Partners

Technical details
- Cost: $700 million
- Buildings: 13 story hotel, 24 story office building, 16 story office building, high rise apartment building, low rise apartment building
- Size: 17 acres (6.9 ha)

Brooklyn Village is a 17 acres (6.9 ha) development in Uptown Charlotte that was May 2025 has been delayed several years. It is paying tribute to a former black neighborhood in the Second Ward of Uptown that was demolished in the 1960s as part of an urban renewal campaign.

== Early Brooklyn History ==
The 238 acres (96 ha) neighborhood was originally known as Logtown. Then in the 1880s the name Brooklyn was slowly adopted. A major step towards the development of Brooklyn came when W.R. Myers donated land in Second Ward to build the city's first black grade school. The school was located at Myers and Brooklyn Village opened in 1886. By the late 1890s two of the city's five black meeting halls were located in Brooklyn. Also, the city's two leading black physicians owned homes in the neighborhood. In 1904 the city's first black library, the Brevard Street Library opened. However, tensions were brewing between white businesses and black businesses. In the 1890s a city alderman threatened to removed black businesses from the central business district. In 1902 restaurants were singled out as "the 'nasty little negro restaurants' on East Trade, declaring that they should be taxed so heavily they should have to leave the street".

Another step forward in the development of Brooklyn was when the Afro-American Mutual Insurance Company moved to Brooklyn. The company sold policies made for African Americans by African Americans. Their business model was based on the idea of economic self-sufficiency made popular by black leaders Booker T. Washington and W.E.B. DuBois. The plans were five cents a week and the business experienced a lot of growth. In 1907 the company built a three-story building on the 400 block of East Second street. Black builder W.W. Smith was hired to design and build the three-story building. The construction of this building meant a lot of additional construction projects for W.W. Smith, since his skills gave his buildings very appealing looks. Part of Smith's reputation was for performing the brick work for Grace A.M.E. Zion Church built in 1902. The building began to attract black business owners to Brooklyn. These business owners were leaving downtown to relocate to main street in Brooklyn, which was a few blocks away from their prior locations. Proof of the building boom that came from the 1907 building was in 1910 when the AME Zion Publishing House constructed a building next to the Afro-American Mutual Insurance Company called the Hotel Williams, which facilitated a construction boom. The following 15 years saw the construction of a dozen buildings containing 30 companies. By the 190s Brooklyn had black restaurants, drugstores, barbers, shoemakers, hairdressers, undertakers, the Palace movie theater. Businesses filled the 400 block of East Second Street, adjacent blocks, and around the corner on South Brevard Street.

In 1921 Tad Tate and J.T. Williams organized a professional cooperative for black professionals called the Mecklenburg Investment Company. This organization was composed of doctors, dentists, and lawyers that were unable to office space downtown. In 1926 the MIC building, designed by W.W. Smith, was built at the corner of Brevard Street and Third. This is one of the four Brooklyn buildings still standing.

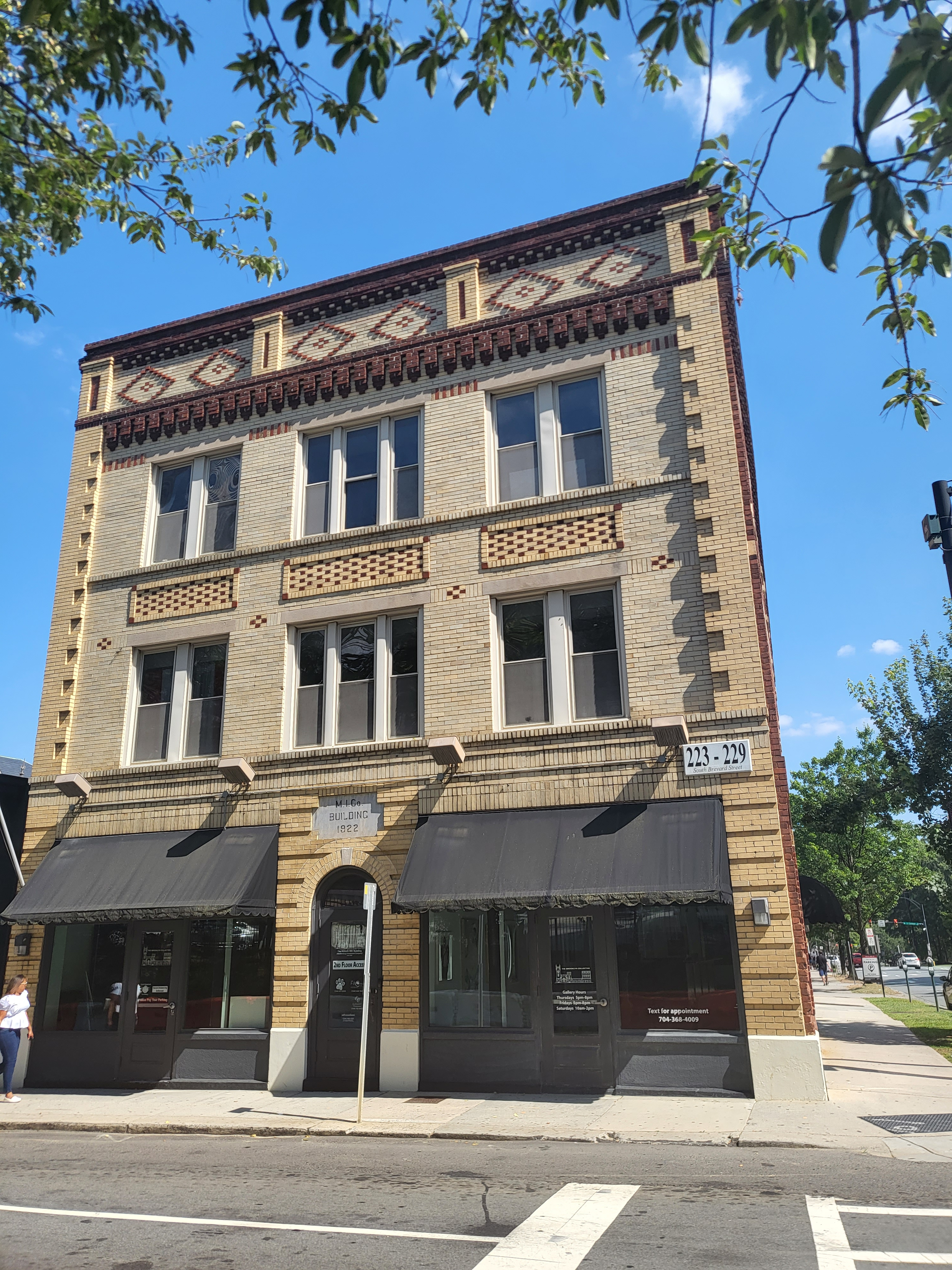
Mecklenburg Investment Company Building is one of the four remaining Brooklyn buildings, seen here in August 2023.

== The Decline of Brooklyn ==
By June 1960 many people began to view Brooklyn as an overcrowded area of slums. At that time the area consisted of 238 acres (96 ha) containing 1,700 buildings. Charlotte Observer staff writer Joe Doster in January 1960 wrote an editorial about his view of the current state of Brooklyn and how it could benefit the city to clear the parts within it he believed were slums. He stated the area had a high crime rate, it produce little in taxes for the city, and the city housing department found that 77 percent of the houses met the law's standard of "blighted".

In October 1962 the Charlotte Observer ran an article citing 240 houses in Brooklyn and another 450 houses were expected to be destroyed due to poor conditions. The displacement was part of the second Brooklyn redevelopment project. Third, fourth, and fifth redevelopment projects were expected to displace 1,200 families. The city sought financial assistance with the second urban renewal projects from the federal government agency Urban Renewal Administration. However, funds would be approved only if the city relocated the 240 displaced families into standard housing. Also, in October 1962 the Charlotte Redevelopment Commission won a court case to allow for the demolition of 44 houses without condemnation. This battle was part of the first Brooklyn redevelopment project that targeted 128 parcels. All 128 houses would have to be purchased by the commission before bulldozing them. At the time of the Charlotte Observer article 68 had been purchased.

In May 1961 15 Belmont Abby College students spent a month conducting a study of Brooklyn resident's feelings about the state of Brooklyn and its clearance. The study was for Sister M Annella's urban sociology class and it was a cooperation between the class and the Charlotte Redevelopment Commission. Of the 1,599 people contacted usable information was obtained from 1,160 people. Ninety one percent of the 1,160 people knew the area was going to cleared. 872 saw no change in the area since the clearance program have been noticed, 288 noticed a change, 133 though conditions had improved, and 155 thought conditions had worsened. 970 of the 1,160 were in favor of the clearance program and 106 were against it. Also, 559 people were worried about the conditions of Brooklyn, 585 were not bothered by it, and 16 were undecided. The students expected the survey results would be useful to the Charlotte Redevelopment Commission.

In 1960 many of the Brooklyn homes in disrepair were losing money for the city. Most of the homes were owned by a small group of white landowners. However, most houses were occupied by blacks. A 1960 survey found that of the 2,065 families surveyed only 14 owned their homes. These houses produced a high return for their owners. One typical landowner owned 41 houses across the street from city hall. The houses had a total valuation of $40,470. However, the city tax bill was $825.59. The landlord generated $21,000 of annual income from the houses. The houses were basically identical consisting of 912 square feet and the properties likely dated back to the 1930s. In 1960 the city only earned $61,000 in taxes on the 238 acres (96 ha) of Brooklyn.

In 1961 several City Council candidates argued about the Brooklyn urban renewal projects. A Charlotte Observer article describes the three objectives of the Brooklyn urban renewal projects "To prevent healthy areas of a city from turning into slums, to rehabilitate blighted areas that can be restored from turning into slums, and lastly, to clear and redevelop, with federal aid, slum areas that cannot be saved by any other method." At that time Brooklyn was the city's big slum issue. Its conditions resulted from 50 years of neglect. The area was believed to be too far gone to legislated back to an improved condition. A big sign of the decay of the area was the federal government would not approve any loans for Brooklyn home owners.

From 1960 to 1977 1,000 families and 200 businesses were removed from the neighborhood. Today only four Brooklyn buildings exist they are the Mecklenburg Investment Company Building (MICo) at 229 S Brevard Street, Studio 229, Grace A.M.E. Zion Church at 229 S Brevard Street and Second Ward High School Gymnasium at 710 E Martin Luther King Jr. Blvd. Three out of four of these buildings are occupied by nonprofit organization The Brooklyn Collective.

The Brooklyn Collective on their website states their purpose is "The Brooklyn Collective is a nonprofit with a mission to accelerate inclusivity and economic mobility in Charlotte, NC." The organization highlights the art, architecture, and culture of Brooklyn. It is composed of nine small businesses and nonprofits whose mission it is to bring the spirit of Brooklyn back to Charlotte.

== Criticism of the demolition of Brooklyn ==
Charlotte author and historian Pamela Grundy describes the anger many people feel towards Brooklyn being destroyed. Grundy says "There are two parts to it. You can remember Brooklyn all you want, but the question is what you do to address the damage that destroying the community did. It's fine to call it Brooklyn Village. It's nice to put up some plaques, but what aspect of that project is actually going to go toward addressing the wrongs that were done." Executive Director of The Brooklyn Collective, Monique Douglas, added "Progress is necessary. But [they need to] ensure that as they're bringing in projects and taking on that name, Brooklyn, that they're making sure they also incorporate the true history within whatever projects they're doing. We have the historic buildings that are still there too. There should be collaboration between the new and the real Brooklyn."

Local news outlet Axios Charlotte wrote an article detailing from a firsthand perspective the loss many Brooklyn residents experienced as a result of the neighborhood being demolished. The article describes how a former Brooklyn resident Jacqueline Stowe tried to tell her great-grandchildren about her childhood. Her former church stood where part of I-277 is today, she used to go to Lincoln theater to see movies. Stowe is part of a generation of people that lost their community when Brooklyn was torn down. It is also unclear if Brooklyn residents were fairly compensated for their houses. Many houses were listed for $100. However, it is unclear what compensation home owners actual received.

Also, it is possible that black home owners and business owners missed out on a lot of wealth that could have been accumulated had they been allowed to hold onto their land. Today Marshall Park is worth $31.9 million for 5 acres (2.0 ha). First Baptist Church purchased 5 acres (2.0 ha) of former Brooklyn land for $439,000 in the 1960s. Now First Baptist Church's land is worth $30 million or $6 million per acre. The article suggests Brooklyn land owners could have been wealthy today just based on current land values.

Many critics of the government's urban renewal programs in the 1960s called it "negro removal", which comes from a quote from James Baldwin. Critics also point to the Charlotte Observer's series of articles as part of the campaign to classify Brooklyn as a "slum". The Axios Charlotte article states to receive federal funding the area had to be legally considered a slum. The Charlotte Observer often said that more 77% of Brooklyn was "blighted". Willie Griffin, assistant professor of public history at UNC Charlotte claimed that half of all Brooklyn residents owned their homes. However, this directly conflicts with a survey in 1960 whose findings were published in the Charlotte Observer. The survey found that of the 2,065 families surveyed only 14 owned their homes.

== Development History ==
The criticism of the demolition of Brooklyn is a huge motivating factor for the creation of Brooklyn Village. This concern was apparent as one of the developers of the project weighted in on the challenge of the project. Monte Ritchey, head of Conformity Corp., told the Charlotte Observer in August 2016 "It is a tragic thing, by my estimation. It's just an unbelievable thing for me... It's crystal clear to me just how complete a place this was, that was undone for all the wrong reasons." Another developer, David Dixon of Stantec, added "We're not rebuilding the past. We're adding to the present".

In June 2016 Mecklenburg County commissioners voted to begin negotiations with the real estate partnership BK Partners. It is formed by Charlotte-based Conformity Corp., New York-based developer The Peebles Corp., and Stantec. The partnership will redevelop two parcels of land in Uptown totaling 17 acres (6.9 ha). A 5.7 acres (2.3 ha) parcel then occupied by Bob Walton Plaza and a 11.7 acres (4.7 ha) site containing Marshall Park and a Charlotte Mecklenburg School's property, the former education board. Initially the negotiations process was expected to take six months. To ease Commissioner's causes about the loss of 5 acres (2.0 ha) Marshall Park BK Partners agreed to set aside 1.9 acres (0.77 ha) for green space and a public park.

In August 2016 BK Partners held its first public meeting to outline the plan for Brooklyn Village. The presentation included a discussion of the purpose of the development, to pay tribute to Brooklyn. It was a vibrant black community in the Second Ward that was torn down in the name of urban renewal. During the meeting Peebles, president of The Peebles Corp., one of the three organizations that formed the development group stated this about Brooklyn “Lessons from the past should provide us a vision and inspiration for the future”. After the presentation several groups including former Brooklyn residents, representatives from On Q Performing Arts Inc. and Johnson C. Smith University asked about how they could be involved in the planning and how they could have a presence in Brooklyn Village once it is built. Future meetings were scheduled for later in the month and September. Future discussion topics were to include project participation by women, minority, small business owners, inclusion of public spaces, and inclusion of workforce housing.

The $700 million project will be built in three phases spanning 12 years. The first phase will be built upon the 5.7 acres (2.3 ha) site of the former Walton Plaza, which will be divided into six separate parcels. It will include a 13-story 150 room hotel, a 420 unit high rise apartment building, 120 unit low rise apartment building, a 24-story office building, a 16-story office building, and 106,800 square feet (9,920 m^{2}) of retail. The other two phases will occupy the 5.43 acres (2.20 ha) site of Marshall Park at 303 S. McDowell and site 5.91 acres (2.39 ha) of the former Board of Education building at 701 W. Martin Luther King Jr. Blvd. The total project will consist of 1,200 residential units, 712,000 square feet (66,100 m^{2}) of office space, 252,000 square feet (23,400 m^{2}) of retail, and 280 hotel rooms.

The final master plan was approved in June 2018. In September 2019 it was decided that BK Partners must close on the first piece of land within 18 months after the due diligence period is completed. This placed the first closing in early 2023. In October 2022 it was announced that the first phase would be break ground in February 2023. Construction was planned to take 36 months to complete.

The 5.7 acres (2.3 ha) site of Walton Plaza site was purchased by BK Partners for $10.3 million in July 2023. Construction will start in the fall 2023 with demolishing of Walton Plaza.

Monte Ritchey, developer with The Conformity Corp., gave a talk on Brooklyn Village in September 2023 where he explained the behind-the-scenes process of the development. The slow pace has been due to the challenge of public and private partnership developments. The biggest challenge of the development could be the office component since the development includes 1,500,000 square feet (140,000 m^{2}) of office space. Which could be risky since a lot of companies are scaling back their office space due to so many employees working from home. He estimates that 4,000,000 square feet (370,000 m^{2}) of office space is vacant in Uptown. In June 2023 the Charlotte Business Journal reported that 5 Uptown towers have over 60% availability and 10 towers have 50% availability. Ritchey further stated that 8 or 9 Uptown towers have loans in default. With this sort of office climate he predicts it will be very difficult to lease a substantial portion of the office space the project is building. Overall, the development is going to be massive contained in 15 buildings over 3,000,000 square feet (280,000 m^{2}) of space. The space breaks down as 1,100 multifamily units, 2 hotels, and 250,000 square feet (23,000 m^{2}) of retail space, and the office space already mentioned. The challenge with this project is BK Partners is contractual obligated to deliver such a massive development even if the hotel and office markets are not favorable. In February 2025, Peebles proposed reducing the amount of the apartment buildings by 50%, citing an inability to attract financing.

== Criticism of the development ==
In September 2023 the demolition of Bob Walton Plaza began. The building itself dates back to 1973 and it was originally named East Independence Plaza. It was one of few black owned and occupied buildings in the country at that time. Only one other substantial black owned office building was built in the US between the late 1920s and early 1960s, that building was in Los Angeles. Then in the late 1960s in Durham, North Carolina a black owned office building was completed. Some of the building's early tenants included prominent Civil Rights lawyer Julius Chambers, a regional office of the NAACP Legal Defense Fund, former Charlotte mayor Harvey Gantt's architecture firm, and several practices of black doctors. The building was considered a hub for black professionals. Due to the racial tensions in the city few tenants of other races rented space in the building.

Then in 1994 Mecklenburg County purchased the building for $6 million. It was initially renamed Stonewall Plaza and then in 1996 it was renamed Bob Walton Plaza. Country commissioner Bob Walton's prior accusation of sexually assaulting an 18-year male made it a controversial name. Mel Watt, the initial developer of the building, views the demolition with mixed emotions. Watt summarized his overall feelings about the project as “This seems to me to be a total disregard of the history of Brooklyn just as the urban removal was a total disregard for the people who lived there”.

== Brooklyn Village Redevelopment Delays ==
The project has faced numerous delays and financial challenges since its selection in 2016. Many critics have pointed to the Mecklenburg Board of County Commissioners inability to properly vet the development teams and potential conflicts of interest in selecting BK Partners.Perkins, Michael (August 2, 2016). "Brooklyn Village plan aims to revitalize Charlotte's Second Ward". The Charlotte Observer.

The original master plan has been abandoned and The Peebles Corporation is currently seekd a $13.8 million loan to begin construction on a modified first phase.Thomas, Ashley Fahey (August 8, 2024). "Brooklyn Village in Charlotte still facing delays". Charlotte Business Journal. Even this drew criticisms as the affordable housing developmwnt partner selected for the project is Peebles' son, who has no development experience and is currently employed by his father's firm, despite alleging to be the CEO of the affordable housing company,Legacy Real Estate Development.

The project was originally expected to be completed by 2021. However, the developers have made nearly no progress and alleged there were issues regarding property ownership between the city and county, coupled with extended negotiations, delayed the start of construction."Why Brooklyn Village keeps getting delayed". WCNC Charlotte. August 15, 2024.

BK Partners faced difficulties securing financing as a result of rising interest rates and tighter lending conditions. These economic headwinds forced the developers to delay vertical construction to mid-2026. Additionally, an oversupply of multifamily units and shifting demand for office space in Charlotte exacerbated the challenges.

In early 2025, BK Partners proposed significant changes to Phase I in response to financial and market pressures. The revised plan prioritized building 250 affordable housing units with a 99-year affordability covenant, replacing the originally planned market-rate apartments.Fahey, Ashley (February 5, 2025). "Brooklyn Village's Phase I to focus on affordable housing". Charlotte Business Journal. Charlotte's housing authority, Inlivian, joined the project to co-develop the affordable units and provide supportive services such as childcare and financial literacy programs."Brooklyn Village pivots to affordable housing amid delays". Axios Charlotte. February 5, 2025.

The repeated delays have drawn criticism to Mecklenburg County commissioners from community members. Some officials have suggested reevaluating BK Partners’ role and considering alternative development proposals."Commissioners express frustration with Brooklyn Village delays". Axios Charlotte. August 8, 2024.

== See also ==
- List of tallest buildings in North Carolina / the United States / the world
- List of tallest buildings in Charlotte
- Brooklyn (Charlotte, North Carolina)
- Grace A.M.E. Zion Church
