= Grace A.M.E. Zion Church =

Historic church in North Carolina, United States

- U.S. National Register of Historic Places
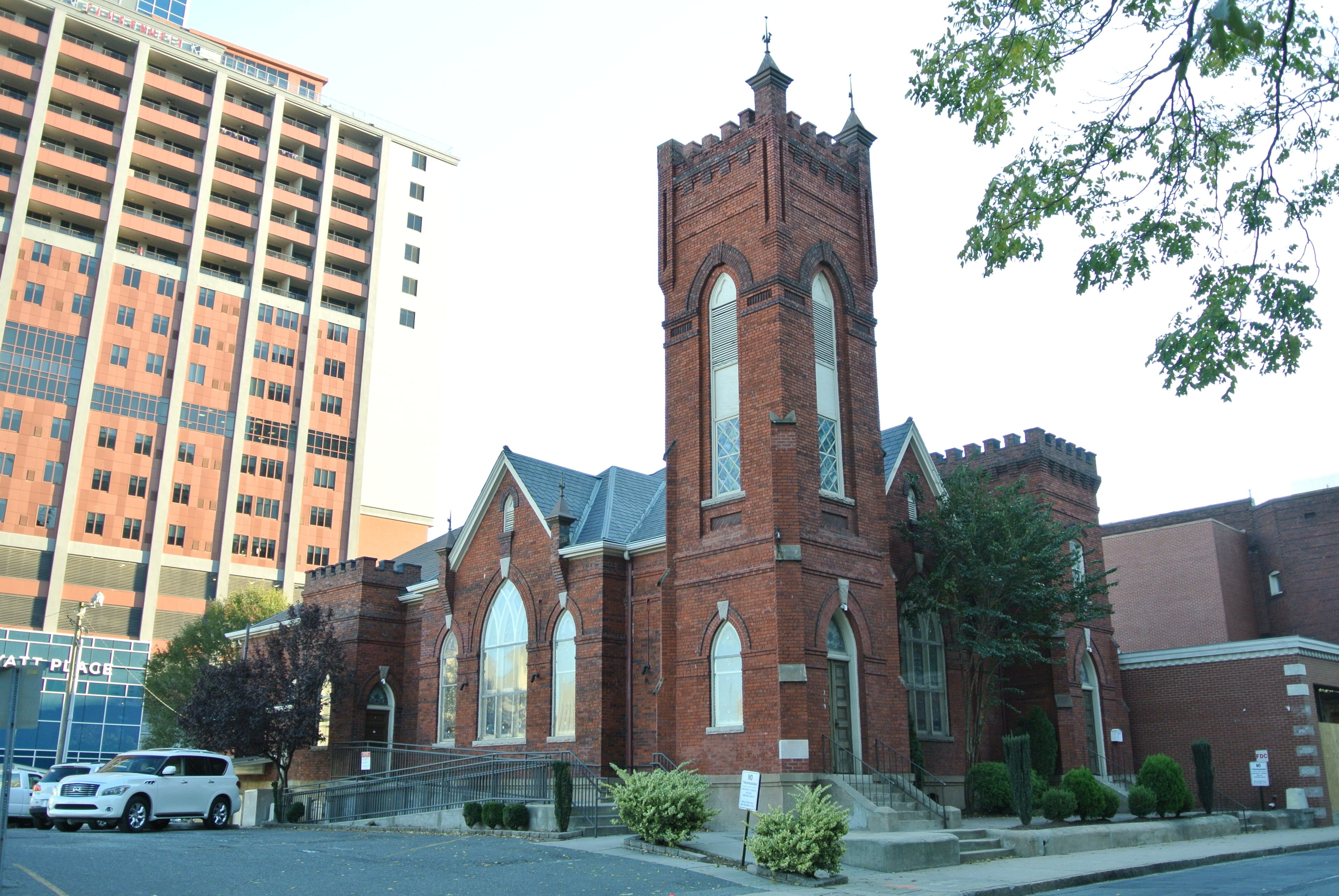
- Grace A.M.E. Zion Church, October 2016

- Location within North Carolina Location within the United States
- Location: 219-223 S. Brevard St., Charlotte, North Carolina
- Coordinates: 35°13′24″N 80°50′31″W
- Area: 0.3 acres (0.12 ha)
- Built: 1901-1902
- Built by: William W. Smith
- Architect: Hayden, Wheeler and Schwend
- Architectural style: Gothic Revival
- NRHP reference No.: 08000412
- Added to NRHP: May 15, 2008

Grace A.M.E. Zion Church is a historic African Methodist Episcopal Zion church located in what was once the Brooklyn neighborhood of Charlotte, Mecklenburg County, North Carolina. It was built in 1901–1902, and is a Gothic Revival style brick church. The front facade features two crenellated entry towers of unequal height with matching Gothic arched entrances. It is one of the oldest of the remaining African American churches associated with Charlotte's historic black districts.

It was added to the National Register of Historic Places in 2008 and is at 219-223 S. Brevard Street. The congregation relocated when Brooklyn was razed in the 1960s for an urban renewal program. The church is one of the few remaining buildings in the area from the neighborhood.

The church was designed by the Charlotte architectural firm of Hayden, Wheeler and Schwend and built by contractor William W. Smith, an African American.

== See also ==
- National Register of Historic Places listings in Mecklenburg County, North Carolina
