= David Jenkins (abolitionist) =

American abolitionist and politician

David Jenkins (c. 1811 – September 4, 1876) was an abolitionist, civil rights campaigner, newspaper founder, and politician in Columbus, Ohio and Mississippi. He served as a state legislator in the Mississippi House of Representatives. He was a Republican. He represented Madison County, Mississippi.

He was an agent on the Underground Railroad. At age 26 he moved to Columbus, Ohio. An abolitionist, he co-founded a short-lived abolitionist paper in Columbus. He then became a school teacher. During the Civil War he served in the 127th Ohio Infantry. After the war he worked for the Freedmens Bureau in Mississippi.

In 1876 he voted against impeachment of T. W. Cardozo.

He and Alfred Handy, another African American state legislator for Madison County, were warned about opposing "honest rule" in a notice run in the Canton Mail in 1876.

He died in Canton, Mississippi.

== See also ==
- African American officeholders from the end of the Civil War until before 1900
