= Swank Social Club =

Swank Social Club began as a social club for a group of students from Second Ward High School in Charlotte, North Carolina. The club has since evolved into a social oriented organization and is now Charlotte's oldest African American social club.

John M Spears suggested a group of boys organize themselves formally into a club, with a name, motto, colors and even a flower. The Swank Social Club was created in 1943 in a house on Seventh Street. Along with Spears, Ray Booton, John Brooks, Elliot Samuels, Thomas Wyche and John Breeden were the charter members. The boys pulled the name 'swank' from an exclusive line of men's jewelry. World War II disrupted the club for a few years, however club activities resumed in 1946.

The Swank is also a philanthropic organization. They furnished a room at the McCrory YMCA, contributed to the United Negro College Fund, Johnson C. Smith University, Second Harvest and assist the Mecklenburg Court Volunteers.

The Club also holds social activities including a New Year's Eve parties, and a Labor Day Cookout.

Club members are prominent African Americans of a variety of careers including educators, businessmen, bankers, doctors, and lawyers in the Charlotte area. In order to join the Swank one must be invited. Membership is limited to thirty people. The club usually meets once a month at a local restaurant.

== External sources ==
- Around Town
- Swank Social Club Records, J Murrey Atkins library, UNC Charlotte
