= John Mercer Langston =

American politician (1829–1897)

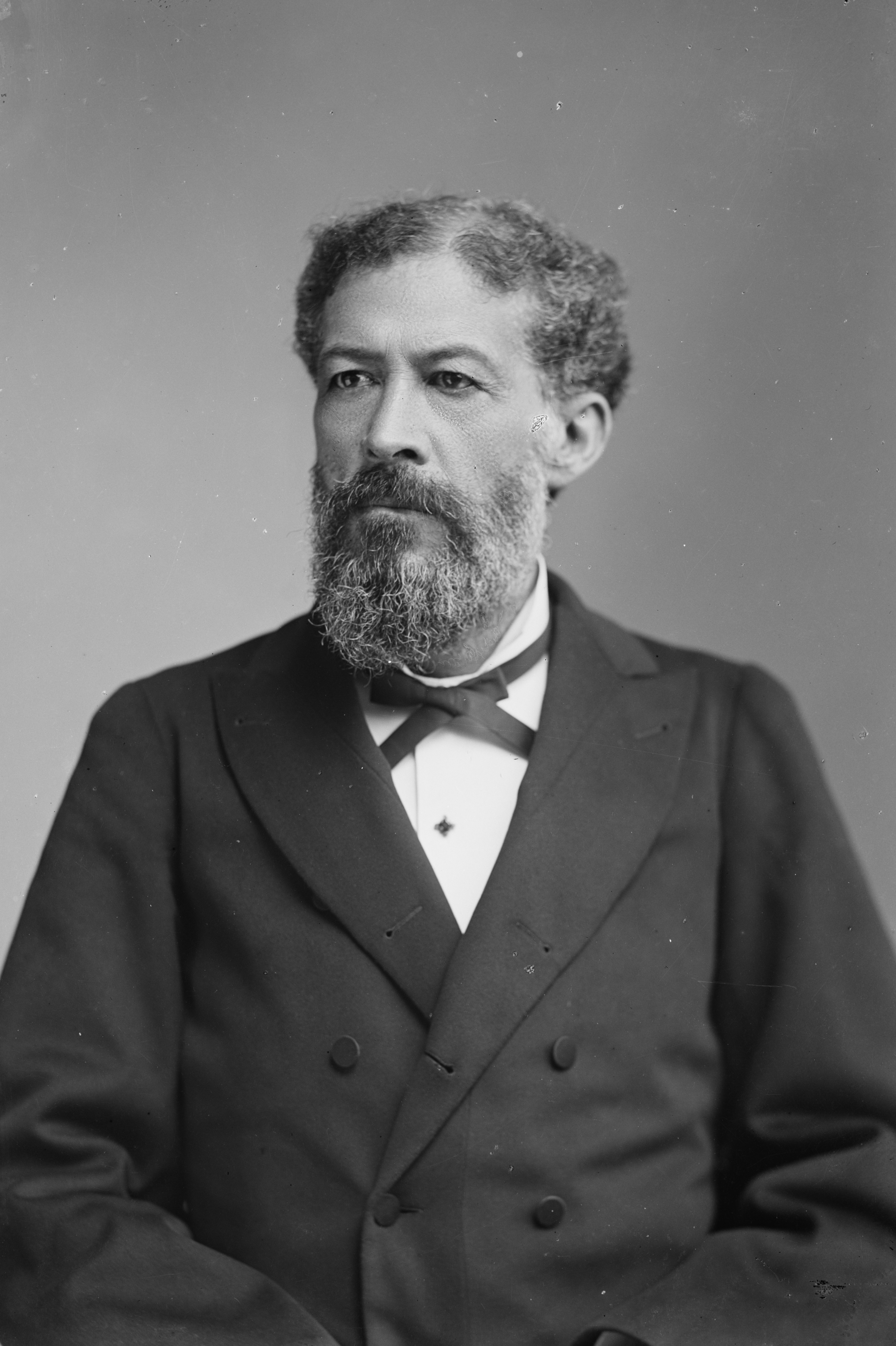
- Portrait by C. M. Bell, 1890

Member of the U.S. House of Representatives from Virginia's 4th district
- In office September 23, 1890 – March 3, 1891
- Preceded by: Edward Carrington Venable
- Succeeded by: James F. Epes

1st President of Virginia Normal and Collegiate Institute
- In office December 21, 1885 – December 23, 1887
- Preceded by: Position established
- Succeeded by: James Hugo Johnston Sr.

United States Minister Resident to the Dominican Republic
- Acting; March 26, 1884 – June 23, 1885
- President: Chester A. Arthur; Grover Cleveland
- Preceded by: Position established
- Succeeded by: John Thompson

United States Minister Resident to Haiti
- In office November 27, 1877 – June 30, 1885
- President: Rutherford B. Hayes; James A. Garfield; Chester A. Arthur; Grover Cleveland
- Preceded by: Ebenezer Bassett
- Succeeded by: George Washington Williams

1st Dean of Howard University School of Law
- In office January 6, 1869 – June 1876
- Preceded by: Position established
- Succeeded by: John F. Cook Jr.

Personal details
- Born: John Mercer Langston; December 14, 1829 Louisa, Virginia, U.S.
- Died: November 15, 1897 (aged 67) Washington, D.C., U.S.
- Citizenship: American; Pamunkey
- Party: Republican
- Other political affiliations: Liberty
- Spouse: Caroline Wall
- Children: 5
- Education: Oberlin College (BA, MA)

John Mercer Langston (December 14, 1829 – November 15, 1897) was an African American abolitionist, attorney, educator, activist, diplomat, and politician. He was the founding dean of the law school at Howard University and helped create the department. During his tenure he was coauthor of the Civil Rights Act of 1875, the blueprint used for the Civil Rights Act of 1964. He was the first president of what is now Virginia State University, a historically black college. He was elected a U.S. representative from Virginia and wrote From the Virginia Plantation to the National Capitol; Or, the First and Only Negro Representative in Congress From the Old Dominion.

Born free in Virginia to a freedwoman of mixed ethnicity, and a white Virginian planter, Langston was elected to the United States Congress in 1888. He was the first Black Congressman elected from Virginia. He was one of five African Americans elected to Congress from the South before the former Confederate states passed constitutions and electoral rules from 1890 to 1908 that essentially disenfranchised blacks, excluding them from politics. After that, no African Americans would be elected from the South until 1973, after the federal Voting Rights Act of 1965 was passed authorizing the enforcement of their constitutional franchise rights.

Langston's early career was based in Ohio where, with his older brother Charles Henry Langston, he began his lifelong work for African-American freedom, education, equal rights and suffrage. In 1855 he was one of the first African Americans in the United States elected to public office when elected as a town clerk in Ohio. The brothers were the grandfather and great-uncle, respectively, of the renowned poet Langston Hughes.

== Early life and education ==
John Mercer Langston was born free in 1829 in Louisa County, Virginia, the youngest of a daughter and three sons of Lucy Jane Langston, a freedwoman of mixed African American and Native American descent. She may have had ancestry from the regional Pamunkey tribe. Their father was Ralph Quarles, a white slaveowner from England and her former master. Quarles had freed Lucy and their daughter Maria in 1806, in the course of what was a relationship of more than 25 years. After that, their three sons were born free, as their mother was free. John's older brothers were Gideon and Charles Henry.

Lucy had three children with another partner before she moved into the Great House and deepened her relationship with Quarles. Their three sons were born after this. Of the older half-siblings, William Langston was most involved with Quarles's sons. After their father's death, he relocated with them and a guardian to Chillicothe, Ohio (see below).

Before his death, Ralph Quarles arranged for his Quaker friend William Gooch to be made guardian of his children. As requested by Quarles, after the parents both died in 1833 when John Langston was four, Gooch moved with the boys and their half-brother William Langston to Chillicothe, Ohio, in a free state. Quarles had reserved funds for the boys' education. In 1835 the older brothers Gideon and Charles started at the Oberlin Preparatory School, where they were the first African-American students to be admitted. Gideon looked much like his father; at the age of 21 Gideon took Quarles as his surname and thereafter was known as Gideon Quarles. During this time, young John Mercer Langston lived in Cincinnati, part of that time with John Woodson and his wife. He also attended the private Gilmore High School.

The youngest Langston followed his brothers, enrolling in the Oberlin preparatory program. John Langston earned a bachelor's degree in 1849 and a master's degree in theology in 1852 from Oberlin College. He is the first known Black man to apply to an American law school. Denied admission to law schools in New York and Ohio because of his race, one school told him that "Students would not feel at home with him, and he would not feel at home with them." Langston would study law (or "read the law", as was the common practice then) as an apprentice under abolitionist attorney and Republican congressman Philemon Bliss, in nearby Elyria; he was admitted to the Ohio bar—the first Black— in 1854. In Ohio, Langston was closely associated with abolitionist lawyer Sherlock James Andrews.

== Marriage and family ==
In 1854 Langston married Caroline Matilda Wall, at the time a senior at Oberlin College. From North Carolina, she was the daughter of an enslaved mother and Colonel Stephen Wall, a wealthy white planter. Wall freed his mixed-race daughters Sara and Caroline, and sent them to Ohio to be raised in an affluent Quaker household and educated. An intellectual partner of Langston, Caroline had five children with him, one of whom died in childhood.

When Langston was serving as dean of Howard University's Law School, which he developed (see below), he and his family met James Carroll Napier, a student there. Napier later married their daughter Nettie, who had graduated from Oberlin College. She later became an important activist.

After law school, Napier had returned to Nashville, Tennessee, to set up his law practice before marriage. There he also became a successful businessman and politician. In 1911 he was appointed as Register of the Treasury in President William Howard Taft's administration and was one of four members of his "Black Cabinet".

== Career ==
=== Early activism ===
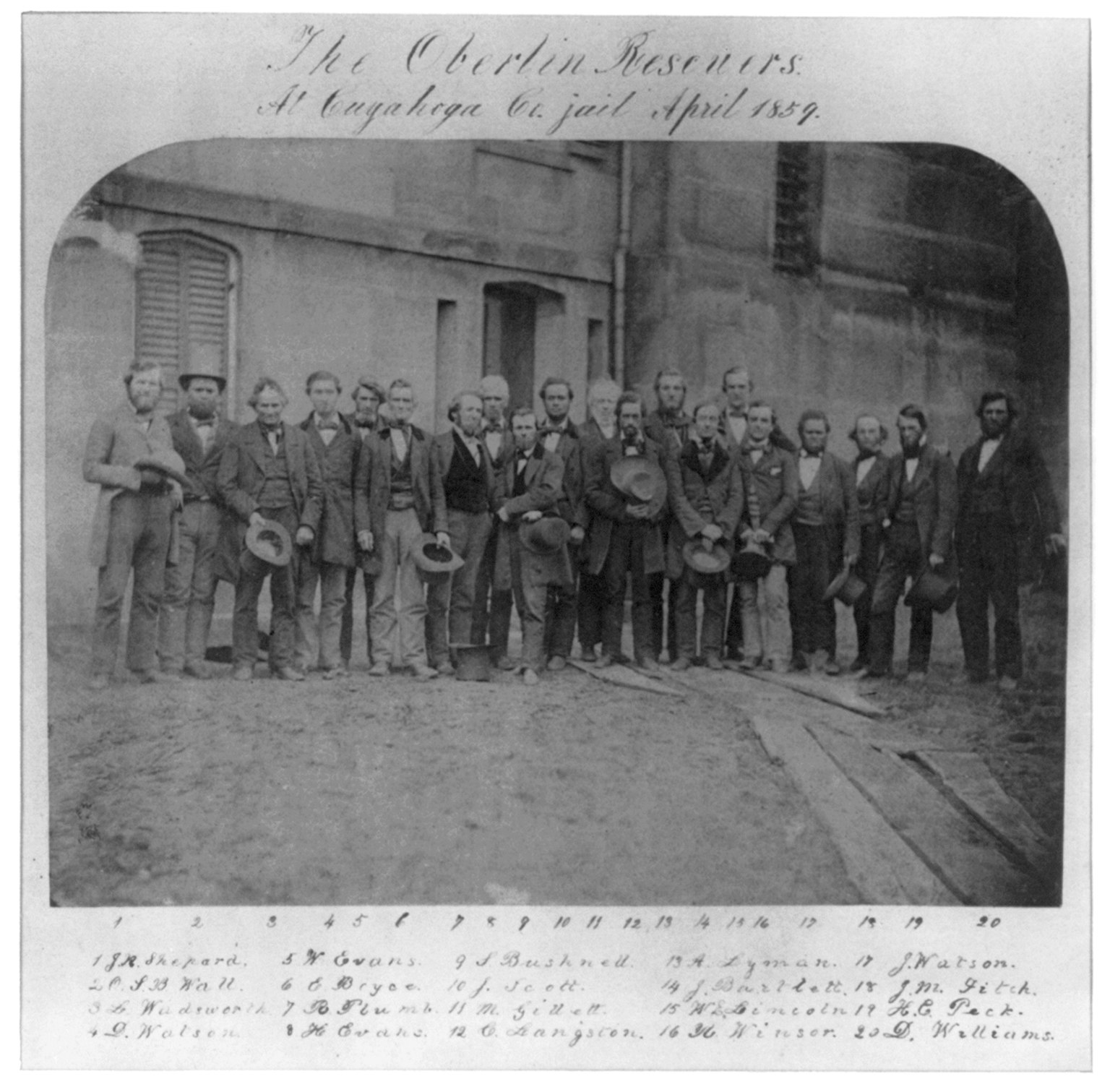
Langston's brother Charles (number 12) with the Oberlin–Wellington rescuers in front of the Cuyahoga County jail, April 1859

Together with his older brothers Gideon and Charles, John Langston became active in the abolitionist movement. He helped refugee slaves to escape to the North along the Ohio part of the Underground Railroad. In 1858 he and Charles partnered in leading the Ohio Anti-Slavery Society, with John acting as president and traveling to organize local units, and Charles managing as executive secretary in Cleveland. John played a key role in the influential Oberlin–Wellington Rescue of 1858.

In 1863, when the federal government approved founding of the United States Colored Troops, John Langston was appointed to recruit African Americans to fight for the Union Army. He enlisted hundreds of men for duty in the Massachusetts Fifty-fourth and Fifty-fifth regiments, in addition to 800 for Ohio's first black regiment. Even before the end of the war, Langston worked for issues of black suffrage and opportunity. He believed that black men's service in the war had earned their right to vote, and that the franchise was fundamental to their creating an equal place in society.

In 1864 Langston chaired the committee whose agenda was ratified by the black National Convention: they called for abolition of slavery, support of racial unity and self-help, and equality before the law. To accomplish this program, the convention founded the National Equal Rights League and elected Langston president. He served until 1868. Like the later National Association for the Advancement of Colored People (NAACP) founded in the early 20th century, the League was based in state and local organizations. Langston traveled widely to build support. "By war's end, nine state auxiliaries had been established; some twenty months later, Langston could boast of state leagues nearly everywhere."

=== Education and government positions ===
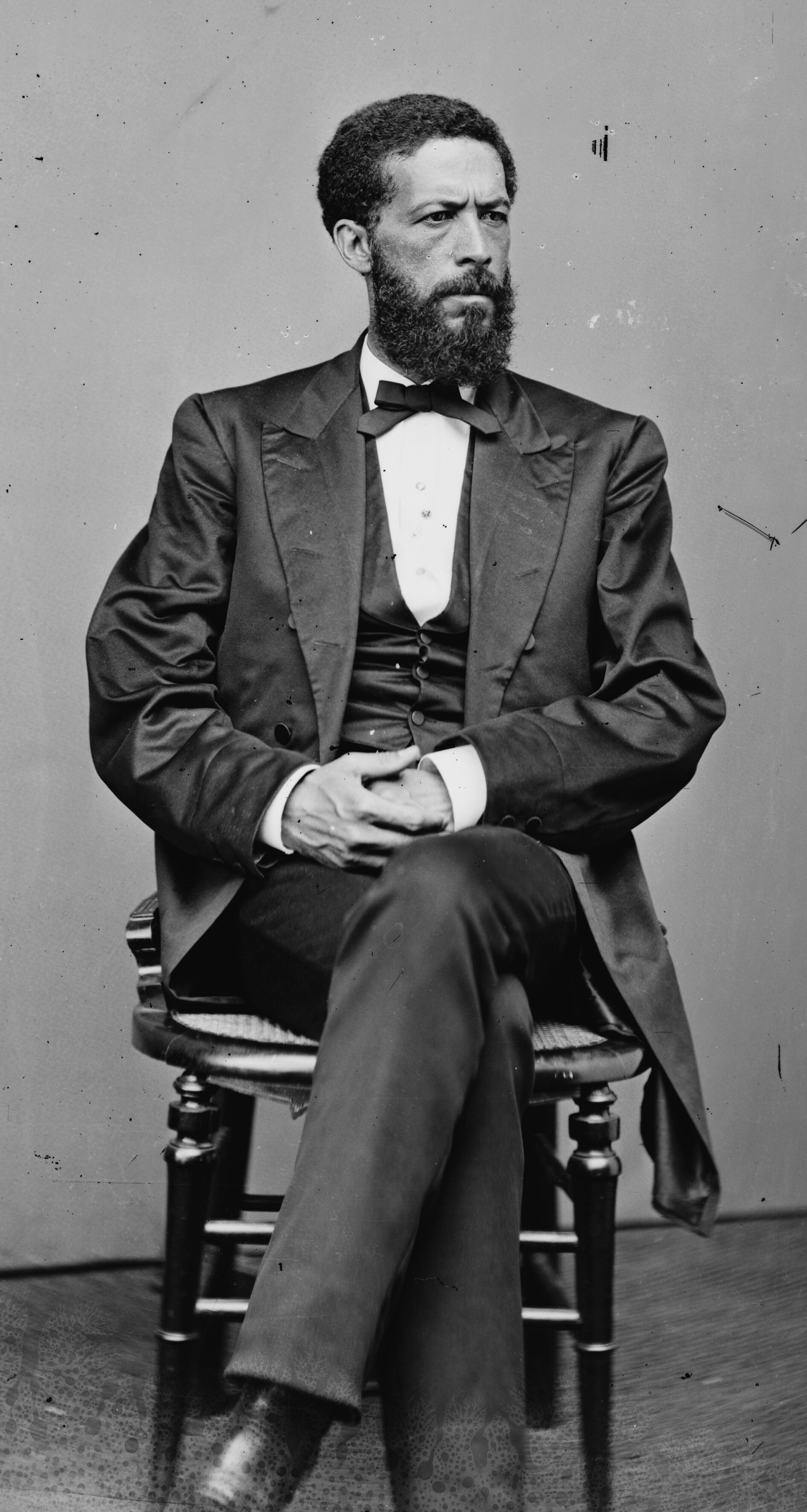
Portrait by Brady c. 1868–1875

After the Civil War, Langston was appointed inspector general for the Freedmen's Bureau, a Federal organization that assisted freed slaves and tried to oversee labor contracts in the former Confederate states during the Reconstruction era. The Bureau also ran a bank and helped establish schools for freedmen and their children.

In 1868 Langston moved to Washington, D.C., to establish and serve as the founding dean of Howard University's law school; this was the first black law school in the country. Appointed acting president of the school in 1872, and vice president of the school, Langston worked to establish strong academic standards. He also engendered the kind of open environment he had known at Oberlin College. Langston was passed over for the permanent position of president of Howard University School of Law; the selection committee refused to disclose the reason.

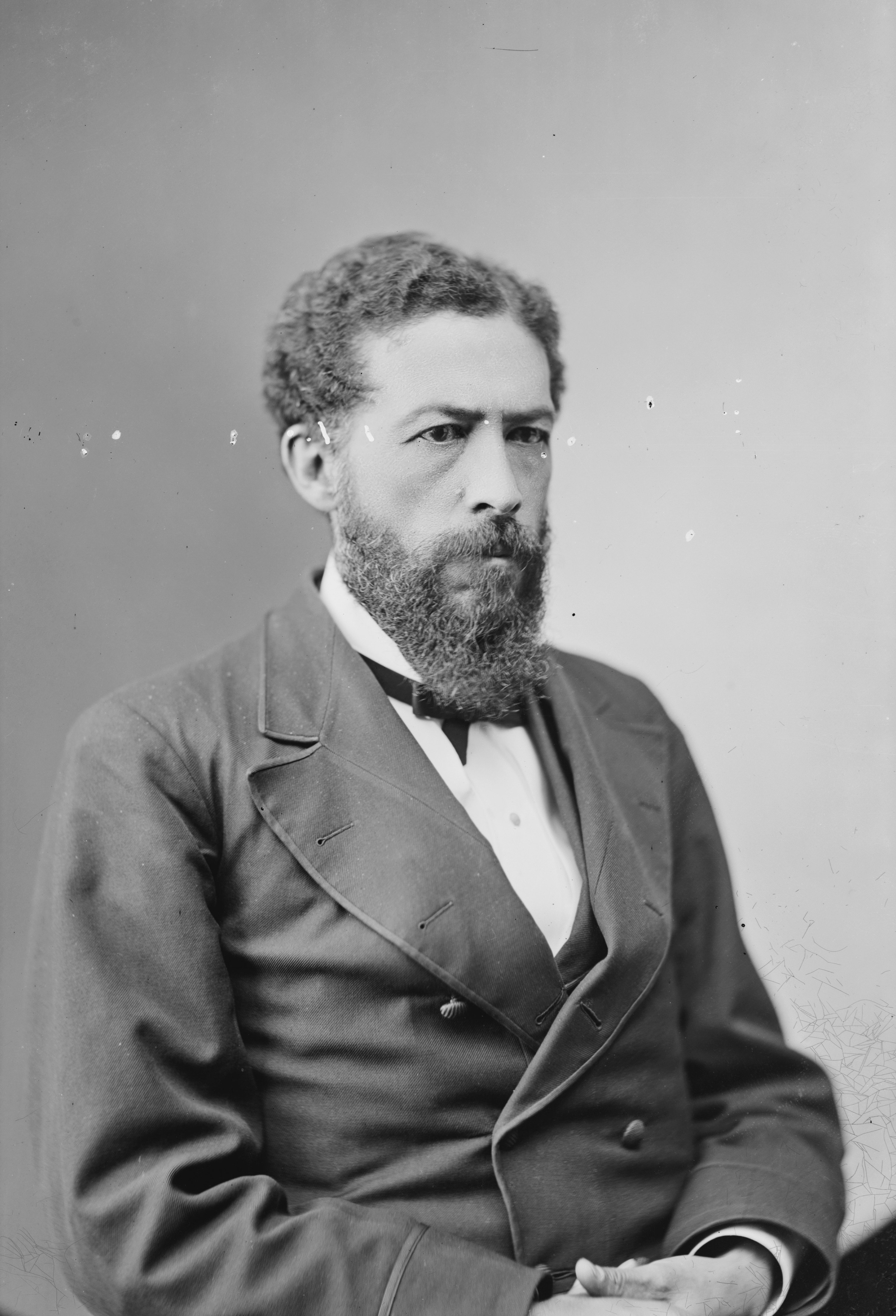
Portrait by Brady c. 1868–1875

During 1870, Langston assisted Republican Senator Charles Sumner from Massachusetts with drafting the civil rights bill that was enacted as the Civil Rights Act of 1875. The 43rd Congress of the United States passed the bill in February 1875 and it was signed into law by President Ulysses S. Grant on March 1, 1875.

President Ulysses S. Grant appointed Langston as a member of the Board of Health of the District of Columbia.

In 1877 President Rutherford Hayes appointed Langston as U.S. Minister to Haiti; he also served as chargé d'affaires to the Dominican Republic. As minister, Langston was frequently occupied by the political unrest in Haiti. He refused to aid defeated factions in an attempt to defuse tensions. Langston also worked to strengthen relations between Haitians and African Americans.

After his diplomatic service, in 1885 Langston returned to the US and Virginia. He was appointed by the state legislature as the first president of Virginia Normal and Collegiate Institute, established as a historically black college (HBCU) and land grant college at Petersburg. (It is now Virginia State University.) There he also began to build a political base.

=== Congress ===
In 1888, Langston was urged to run for a seat in the U.S. House of Representatives by fellow Republicans, both black and white. Leaders of the biracial Readjuster Party, which had held political power in Virginia from 1879 to 1883, did not support his candidacy.

Langston ran as a Republican and lost to his Democratic opponent. He, with Jesse Lawson as his legal counsel, contested the results of the election because of voter intimidation and fraud. After 18 months, the Congressional elections committee declared Langston the winner, and he took his seat in the U.S. Congress. He served for the remaining six months of the term, but lost his bid for reelection as conservative white Democrats had regained political control of Virginia.

Langston was the first black person elected to Congress from Virginia, and he was the last for another century. In a period of increasing disenfranchisement of blacks in the South, he was one of five African Americans elected to Congress during the Jim Crow era of the last decade of the nineteenth century. Two men were elected from South Carolina and two from North Carolina. After them, no African Americans would be elected to Congress from the South until 1972, after passage of the Voting Rights Act to enforce the exercise of constitutional franchise rights for all citizens.

In 1890 Langston was named as a member of the board of trustees of St. Paul Normal and Industrial School, a historically black college, when it was incorporated by the Virginia General Assembly. In this period, he also wrote his autobiography, which he published in 1894.

From 1891 until his death in 1897, he practiced law in Washington, D.C. He died at his home, Hillside Cottage at 2225 Fourth Street NW in Washington, DC, on the morning of November 15. He was first buried at Harmony Cemetery in Maryland. Although there was discussion of reinterring him in Nashville, he was reinterred at Woodlawn Cemetery in Washington, DC.

== Legacy and honors ==
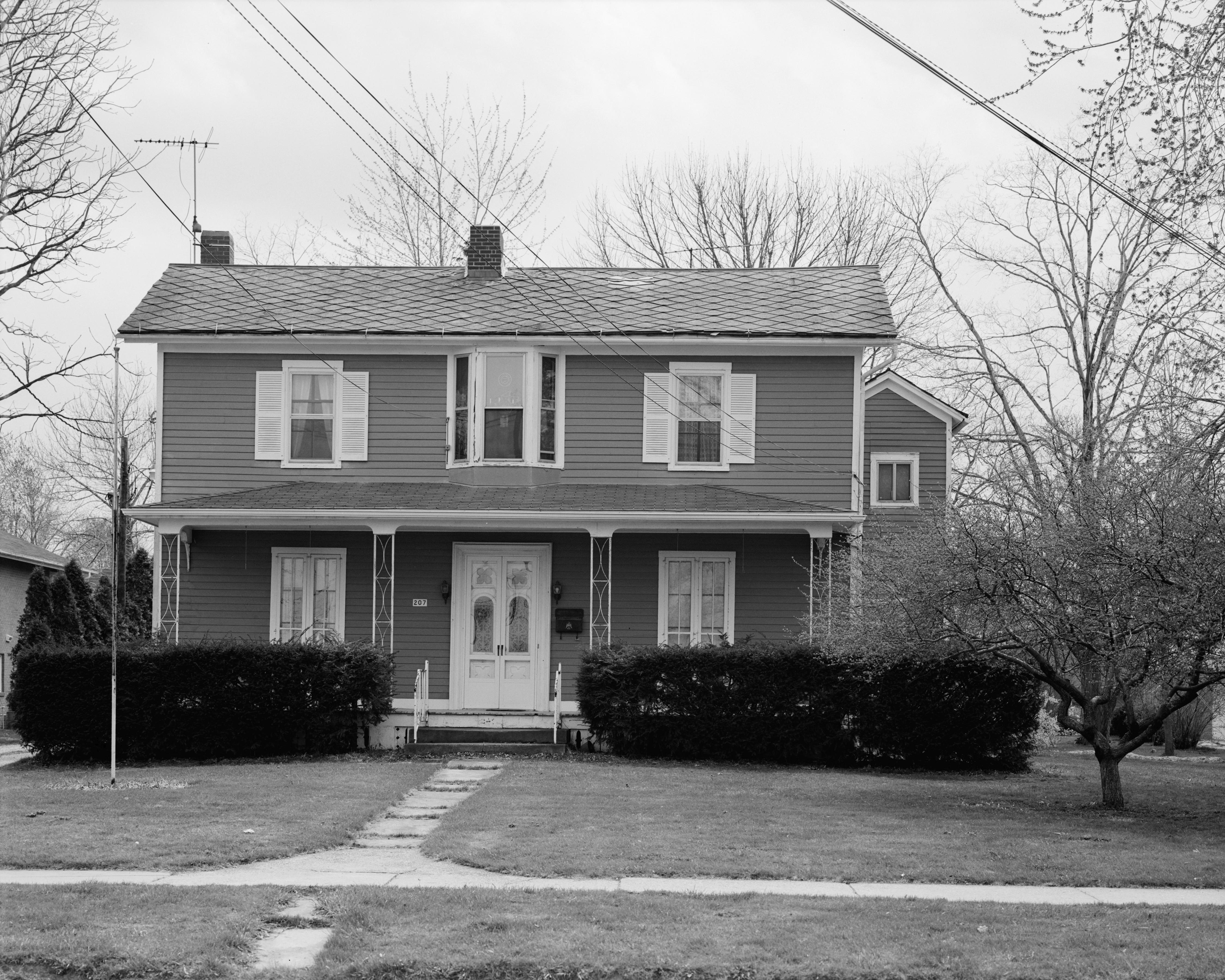
Langston's house in Oberlin was designated as a National Historic Landmark

Langston was the great-uncle of the poet James Mercer Langston Hughes (better known as Langston Hughes).

The John Mercer Langston House in Oberlin, Ohio, has been designated as a National Historic Landmark.

The town of Langston, Oklahoma, founded in 1890 as an all-black town, was named for him. The historically black college in the town, founded in 1897 as the Oklahoma Colored Agricultural and Normal University, was renamed Langston University in honor of John Mercer Langston in 1941.

Langston High School in Johnson City, Tennessee, established in 1893, was named for Langston. John M. Langston High School in Danville, Virginia was also named for John Mercer Langston, as was Langston High School in Hot Springs, Arkansas. Future leaders who attended this school included professional football player Ike Thomas, civil rights activist Mamie Phipps Clark, and physician Edith Mae Irby Jones.

John Mercer Langston Elementary School at 33 P Street NW in Washington, D.C. was named in his honor. It opened in 1902 as a school for black students and operated until 1993. In 1997 the building served as a homeless shelter, but it has mostly been vacant since the school closed.

On July 17, 2021, the Arlington County, Virginia County Board voted to rename its portion of U.S. Route 29, previously named Lee Highway, after John M. Langston. An elementary and community center on U.S. Route 29 already bear his name.

Langston Golf Course in Washington, DC is named in his honor.

His work, along with Charles Sumner, created the Civil Rights Act of 1875, which was the blue print used for the Civil Rights Act of 1964

Despite his prominence during his life, he has all but been forgotten. In The Sun (New York City) obituary dated November 21, 1897, by Timothy Thomas Fortune, he states several arguments as to why: The one great mistake of Mr. Langston’s life was the publication, in 1894, of his autobiography, the grandiloquence of the title, “From the Virginia Plantation to the National Capital,” being moderate as compared with the text. All his mannerisms as a lawyer and orator are preserved in his composition, while his disposition to magnify all things—important, great or small, or any thing or reason in any way related to his life and work—destroy entirely any critical or historical value the work might otherwise possess. Autobiographies are hazardous things to write, and few men have done more than make themselves ridiculous for all time by indulging in the weakness. Mr. Langston succeeded in doing this more completely than any other man I recall, dead or living. The publication of the work did permanent damage to his reputation.

"For a great many years Mr. Langston and Mr. Frederick Douglass were close and helpful friends, laboring side by side for the abolition of slavery, then for the preservation of the Union, and, after the war, for the betterment of the condition of their race, of whom they were the acknowledged leaders, but their paths diverged about twenty years ago. The fiction grew upon Mr. Langston that he was a greater man than Mr. Douglass, and introduced a great deal of bitterness and unpleasantness into his life".

"Mr. Douglass did not allow the matter to bother him at all. He was as modest and retiring in all matters relating to himself as Mr. Langston was unblushing and insistent in forcing attention to himself and to his work in private conversation and public address. But he was never in Mr. Douglass’s class for a moment. He belonged in the middle-weight class, while Mr. Douglass belonged in the heavy-weight class, ranking as orator and philosopher with the best the country has produced of either race. He had the academic training, but he was no match in logic or analysis or charm of spoken or written word with the world-famed giant, who paved his way from the slave pen of the Eastern Shore of Maryland to the pinnacle of fame. Douglass was born with the elements of greatness in him; Langston made himself great by using to the fullest the splendid opportunities that he enjoyed from his youth, and without which he never would have cut any figure in the world."

"In length of service, in native ability, in accomplished work, John Mercer Langston, after the death of Frederick Douglass, easily became the greatest man of his race".

== Works ==
Selected works:

- From the Virginia Plantation to the National Capitol; Or, the First and Only Negro Representative in Congress From the Old Dominion. American Publishing Company. 1894.
- Freedom and Citizenship: Selected Lectures of Hon. John Mercer Langston. Whitefish, MT: Kessinger Publishing Company. 2007 [1883].

== See also ==
- African-American officeholders in the United States, 1789–1866
- Civil rights movement (1865–1896)
- List of African-American firsts
- List of African-American United States representatives

== Notes ==
Academic offices
New office	Dean of Howard University School of Law; 1869–1876	Succeeded by John F. Cook Jr.
New office	President of Virginia State University; 1885–1887	Succeeded by James Johnston
U.S. House of Representatives
Preceded by Edward Carrington Venable	Member of the U.S. House of Representatives from Virginia's 4th congressional district 1890–1891	Succeeded by James F. Epes
Diplomatic posts
Preceded by Ebenezer Bassett	United States Minister Resident to Haiti; 1877–1885	Succeeded by George Washington Williams
New office	United States Minister Resident to the Dominican Republic; Acting; 1884–1885	Succeeded by John Thompson
