= Charles Henry Langston =

American abolitionist and activist (1817–1892)

Charles Langston
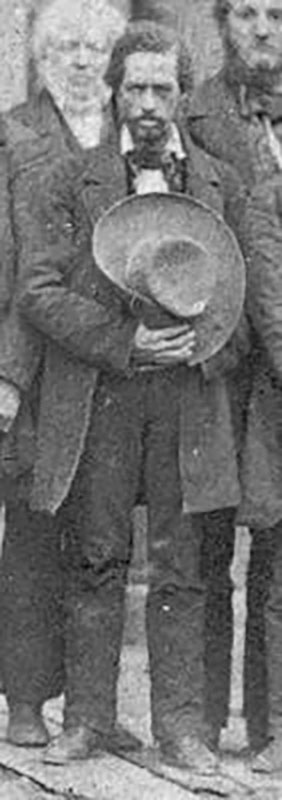
- Langston in 1859
- Born: Charles Henry Langston; 1817; Louisa County, Virginia, U.S.
- Died: 1892 (aged 74–75); Lawrence, Kansas, U.S.
- Education: Oberlin College (BA)
- Known for: Oberlin-Wellington Rescue
- Spouse: Mary Patterson Leary
- Children: 3, including 1 foster

Charles Henry Langston (1817–1892) was an American abolitionist and political activist who was active in Ohio and later in Kansas, during and after the American Civil War, where he worked for black suffrage and other civil rights. He was a spokesman for blacks of Kansas and "the West".

Born free in Louisa County, Virginia, he was the son of a wealthy white planter and his common-law wife of African American-Pamunkey ancestry, whom his father freed. His father provided for his sons' education and ensured Langston and his brothers inherited his estate. In 1835 Langston and his older brother Gideon were the first African Americans to attend Oberlin College in Ohio.

Langston worked for 30 years for equal rights, suffrage and education in Ohio and Kansas. In 1858, Langston was tried with a white colleague for the Oberlin-Wellington Rescue, a cause célèbre that was a catalyst for increasing support for abolition. That year Langston helped found the Ohio Anti-Slavery Society and, with his younger brother John as president, led it as executive secretary. After the American Civil War, he was appointed as general superintendent of refugees and freedmen for the Freedmen's Bureau in Kansas. In 1872 he was appointed as principal of the Quindaro Freedman's School (later Western University), the first black college west of the Mississippi River.

He was an older brother of John Mercer Langston, an accomplished attorney and activist, who had numerous appointed posts, and in 1888 was the first black person elected to the United States Congress from Virginia (and the last for nearly a century). Charles was the grandfather of renowned poet Langston Hughes.

== Early life and education ==
Langston was born free in 1817 in Louisa County, Virginia, the second of three sons and a daughter born to Lucy Jane Langston, a formerly enslaved woman of mixed African-American (including European) and Pamunkey (Native American) descent. Their father was her common-law husband, Ralph Quarles, a wealthy white planter who had immigrated from England. (Note: Quarles was the descendant of the 17th-century English poet Francis Quarles.) Quarles freed Lucy and their daughter Maria in 1806, in the course of what was a common-law relationship of more than 25 years. Charles Langston and his two younger brothers were born free, to a free woman. (Interracial marriage was illegal in Virginia at the time.) In addition to freeing Lucy and Maria, Quarles made legal provisions for his "natural" (illegitimate) children to inherit his substantial fortune after his death.

Lucy had had three children with another partner before she moved into the Great House and deepened her relationship with Quarles. Their three sons were born after that. Of the older half-siblings, William Langston had the closest relationship with Quarles's sons.

Before his death, Ralph Quarles arranged for his Quaker friend William Gooch to be made guardian of his children. As requested by Quarles, after the parents both died in 1833 (when Charles was sixteen and his younger brother John Mercer Langston was four), Gooch moved with the three boys and their half-brother William Langston to Chillicothe, Ohio, in a free state. Their father had left his natural sons substantial inheritances that provided for their education and, as adults, enabled them to work for political reform. The oldest brother, Gideon, looked so much like his father that at age 21, he took the Quarles surname.

In 1835 the older brothers Gideon and Charles started at the preparatory school at Oberlin College, where they were the first students of African descent to be admitted. Charles Langston graduated from Oberlin College. Their younger brother John Langston also graduated from there.

== Career ==
=== Ohio ===
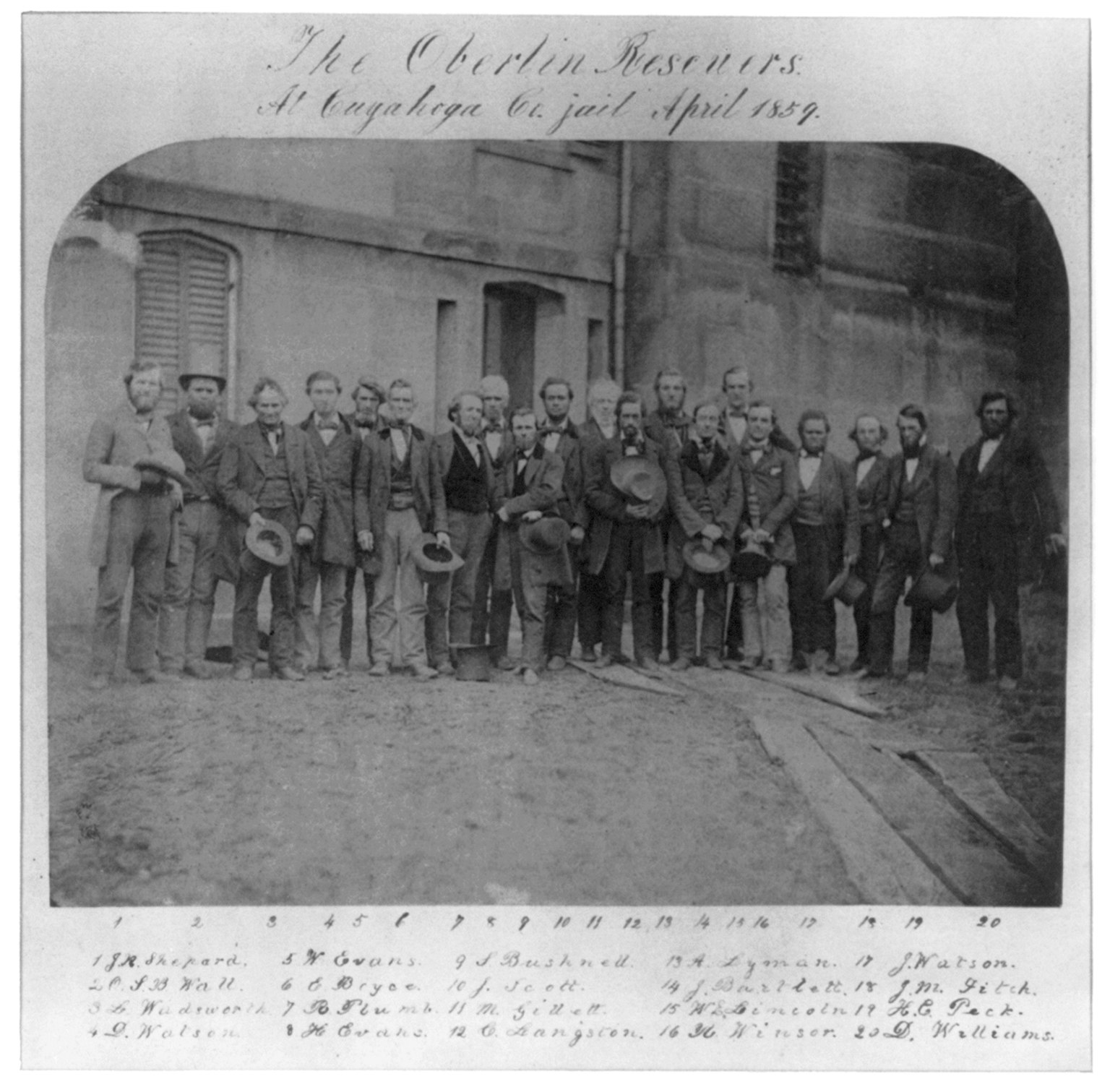
Langston (number 12) with the Oberlin–Wellington rescuers in front of the Cuyahoga County jail, April 1959

Langston quickly became involved in black political affairs in Ohio, where Oberlin was the center of a strong abolitionist movement, with supporters aiding a station on the Underground Railroad. He started working for suffrage and equal rights for blacks. Not only was he active, but Langston introduced his younger brother John to his political circles. He helped the young man be admitted to a state convention in 1850, when he was only 20. It was the start of an illustrious career in which John would eventually overshadow Charles in political office achieved.

In 1858 the older Langston was one of a group of men who freed runaway slave John Price from a US Marshal and his assistants in the Oberlin-Wellington Rescue. The Underground Railroad hid Price in Oberlin, then helped transport him to Canada and freedom. The daring rescue captured national attention. The president demanded that the rescuers be prosecuted.

A grand jury indicted 37 men (among them 12 free blacks). In response, the state arrested the US Marshal and his team. As a result of negotiations between state and federal officials, only Charles Langston and Simon M. Bushnell, a white man, were tried for their part in subverting the 1850 Fugitive Slave Act. The state released the arresting party and the federal government released 35 men.

Both Bushnell and Langston were tried and convicted by the same all-Democratic white jury, an injustice Langston addressed in his speech to the court. He made a rousing statement of the case for abolition and for justice for "colored men", Langston closed with these words:

But I stand up here to say, that if for doing what I did on that day at Wellington, I am to go to jail six months, and pay a fine of a thousand dollars, according to the Fugitive Slave Law, and such is the protection the laws of this country afford me, I must take upon my self the responsibility of self-protection; and when I come to be claimed by some perjured wretch as his slave, I shall never be taken into slavery. And as in that trying hour I would have others do to me, as I would call upon my friends to help me; as I would call upon you, your Honor, to help me; as I would call upon you [to the District-Attorney], to help me; and upon you [to Judge Bliss], and upon you [to his counsel], so help me GOD! I stand here to say that I will do all I can, for any man thus seized and held, though the inevitable penalty of six months imprisonment and one thousand dollars fine for each offense hangs over me! We have a common humanity. You would do so; your manhood would require it; and no matter what the laws might be, you would honor yourself for doing it; your friends would honor you for doing it; your children to all generations would honor you for doing it; and every good and honest man would say, you had done right! [Great and prolonged applause, in spite of the efforts of the Court and the Marshal.]

The judge gave the men light sentences. Langston and Bushnell sued for a writ of habeas corpus in 1859 in the Ohio Supreme Court, but it ruled against them, with the judge saying he had no choice but to uphold the federal law.

=== Kansas ===
Early in the Civil War in 1862, Langston moved to Leavenworth, Kansas, where he organized a school for contrabands, escaped slaves who had fled to Union lines from Missouri. He taught the children for about three years. In 1863, Langston returned to Ohio and, like his brother John Mercer, helped recruit African Americans for the United States Colored Troops when Ohio raised its first regiment.

By 1865, about 2,455 blacks, nearly one-fifth of those in Kansas, lived in Leavenworth, close to Missouri. In 1865, Langston was appointed general superintendent for refugees and freedmen for the Freedmen's Bureau in Kansas. There were more than 12,000 blacks in Kansas by then. While living in Leavenworth, he was active in Topeka, Lawrence, Atchison and small towns in northeastern Kansas, frequently covered in press reports of political activities.

From 1863 to 1870, Langston worked for equality under the law for blacks in Kansas: suffrage, the right to sit on juries and testify in court, and to have black children educated in common schools. In 1863, he helped lead a state convention of African Americans, who petitioned the state legislature to gain suffrage. Continuing years of trying to gain support for this goal, Langston gained support by Republican Governor Samuel J. Crawford for a referendum in 1867 on the question of black suffrage. He always stressed that he sought legal justice as a human being, not a black human being. The referendum bill passed by the legislature, however, asked voters to decide not only on black suffrage, but on women suffrage, and a third question of disenfranchising persons who had supported the Confederacy during the war. National women suffrage advocates came to Kansas to promote their cause. Opponents suggested that recently emancipated black men should not receive suffrage before educated women; both franchise measures were defeated. More votes were cast against women suffrage than against black suffrage

In 1868, Langston moved near Lawrence, Kansas, where he purchased a farm. Despite the efforts of many activists in the state, the legislature did not enfranchise black men until after national passage in 1870 of the Fifteenth Amendment granting the franchise to males without regard for race. Blacks were not authorized to serve on juries until 1874. Langston had pushed for black men to be included on juries (restricted to men at the time), noting that without that representation, blacks were not being tried "by a jury of their peers."

In 1872, Langston was appointed as president of Quindaro Freedman's School (later Western University), then located on the outskirts of Kansas City west of the Missouri River. The college closed in the 20th century and much of the site was abandoned; it was taken over by Kansas City, but major city development moved westward. Today the Quindaro Townsite is preserved for historical purposes, as the site of an early African-American community in the state.

Chartered in 1865 by a group of white abolitionists, Quindaro Freedman's School developed as the earliest college for blacks established west of the Mississippi River. In 1872 the legislature provided funding for its expansion to a four-year curriculum as a normal school, for training of teachers, which Langston headed. Enrollment increased and teachers were trained. The next year, however, the state and school ran into severe financial difficulties, and had to reduce programs when the state suffered agricultural losses. Later in the century the college's programs were revived and expanded, including a theological course. By the early 20th century, the university was promoted as a model of musical and industrial education. It had some noted women graduates who had professional careers in music in New York City. The college closed later in the 20th century, and no buildings remain.

As the black population increased rapidly in Kansas in the decades during and after the Reconstruction era, Langston worked to aid the "exodusters" and other early migrants. From 17,108 blacks in Kansas in 1870, the numbers increased to 43,107 in 1880 and 52,003 by 1900. Most lived in urban areas. In 1880 Langston was president of a statewide Convention of Colored Men that called on the Refugee Relief Board to use monies and goods donated for the new migrants and settle them on school properties to help them get established.

In Lawrence, Langston also served as associate editor of the Historic Times, a local paper that promoted the cause of equal rights and justice for blacks.

== Marriage and family ==
After his first wife died, in 1869 Langston married the widow Mary Patterson Leary in Oberlin. She had survived Lewis Sheridan Leary, another African-American political activist from Oberlin. He had joined John Brown's Raid in 1859 on Harper's Ferry and died of wounds eight days after the attack. Mary brought their daughter Louise to the marriage with Langston. They had two children together.

The Langstons remained in Lawrence, Kansas, for the rest of their lives, moving in 1888 into town, where Charles had a part-interest in a grocery store. Their children were Nathaniel Turner Langston, named after the man who led a slave rebellion in Virginia; and Caroline Mercer Langston. She married and had a son, Langston Hughes, who became a renowned poet in the United States. The Langstons also had a foster son, named Dessalines Langston after a major leader of the Haitian Revolution.

== Community involvement ==
In addition to his political activities, while in Columbus, Ohio, Langston was president of the Colored Benevolent Society, first Worshipful Master of St. Mark's Lodge No. 7.

He also served as Grand Master of the Prince Hall Grand Lodge of Kansas, and a founder of the Inter-state Library Association. He also was active in an African Methodist Episcopal Church.

== Legacy and honors ==
- In 1872 the Kansas Republican Party honored Langston by nominating him as one of four electors to cast the state's votes for President Ulysses S. Grant.
- At his death in 1892, the Lawrence Weekly Record published a 200-word obituary about him, demonstrating his high community standing.
- Historian Richard B. Sheridan wrote of him:

Charles Langston used his time and talents to improve the lives of his fellow African Americans through his leadership in the underground railroad, slave emancipation, education, welfare, politics, fraternal orders, journalism, and other activities. For nearly three decades he had been a leader of the campaigns in Kansas for black suffrage and for blacks’ rights to serve on juries and in the state militia. Moreover, he was a leader in seeking improved social and economic conditions for black citizens.
