= Mary Sampson Patterson Leary Langston =

19th-century American abolitionist

Mary Sampson Leary Langston
- Born: c. 1835; Fayetteville, North Carolina, U.S.
- Died: 1915 (aged 79–80); Lawrence, Kansas, U.S.
- Spouses: Lewis Sheridan Leary (m. 1858–1859) Charles Henry Langston (m. 1869–1892)
- Children: 3, including Carolina Langston
- Relatives: Langston Hughes (grandson)

Mary Sampson Patterson Leary Langston (born Mary Sampson Patterson; c. 1835 – 1915) was an American abolitionist, the first African-American woman to attend Oberlin College, and wife of notable abolitionists Lewis Sheridan Leary and Charles Henry Langston. She was also the grandmother of Langston Hughes and raised him for part of his childhood, inspiring his future work.

== Early life ==
Mary Sampson Patterson was born in North Carolina in about 1835. She claimed that her grandparents had been a French trader and a Cherokee woman. She was born free, and was raised as the ward of a mason and his wife. Her father, John E. Patterson, would take in slaves as apprentices, in order to help them obtain freedom, and then helped them move to the North.

In 1855, Patterson survived an attempted enslavement. Following this, she moved to Oberlin, Ohio in 1857, where she was the first black woman to attend the preparatory department of Oberlin College. Accounts vary as to whether she attended the college itself.

Patterson married fellow Fayetteville-native Lewis Sheridan Leary, a fugitive slave and abolitionist, on May 12, 1858. While little is known of their courtship, they may have known each other as children. Shortly after their marriage, she abandoned her studies. Together, they operated a station on the Underground Railroad. In 1859, Leary went on a trip, leaving behind an either new mother or pregnant Mary. He participated in John Brown's raid on Harpers Ferry, and was killed in the aftermath. According to Hughes, a friend returned Leary's shawl to Mary and was treasured throughout the rest of her life, though this story may be apocryphal. The shawl, which some theorize Leary used to create a quilt, accompanied Hughes throughout his life. Leary advocated for the reburial of the victims of the raid.

Shortly before or after the raid on Harper's Ferry, Leary gave birth to a daughter. Her name varies based on source, including Lois, Louise, Loise, and Louisa. She temporarily lived with her parents, and abolitionists Wendell Phillips and James Redpath aided Leary in raising her daughter. Over the next several years, Leary unsuccessfully attempted to obtain a job teaching freed slaves, and was offered and turned down the opportunity to emigrate to Haiti as an honored guest. In the 1860 Census, she was listed as a milliner.

On January 18, 1869, Mary married one of Lewis's friends and fellow abolitionist Charles Henry Langston. In 1872, they moved to Lawrence, Kansas. The couple bought a house near Kansas University, where they opened a grocery store and raised a foster son, Desalines Langston.

In 1870, the Langstons had a son, Nathaniel Turner Langston, named after Nat Turner. In January 1873, they had another child, Carolina "Carrie" Mercer Langston.

In 1892, Charles died, leaving Mary "nothing but a pair of gold earrings and a mortgaged house." In 1897, their son Nat Turner was killed in an accident at the flour mill where he worked.

== Later life ==
Carrie Langston married James Hughes, but they quickly separated, though not before having a son, Langston. Carrie and Langston returned to Kansas to live with Mary, as Hughes moved to Mexico to work as confidential secretary for the general manager of the Pullman Company. In 1906 Carrie left Langston with her mother so that she could pursue her own career. Although Langston briefly lived with his mother at various points throughout his childhood, he was primarily raised by Mary and her friends, James and Mary Reed.

Mary raised Langston in poverty and relative isolation due to the segregation in Lawrence. Hughes also recalled that, unlike other African American women in Lawrence, she would not work for others, and so did not take jobs like taking in washing or going out to cook for white families. Often they would eat dandelion greens for dinner. In order to pay their mortgage, Mary would rent their home to college students, and she and Langston moved in with the Reeds. However, her storytelling made a large impact on him. She read him stories from the Bible and Grimm's Fairy Tales, but also told him stories about slavery, the fight against slavery, and their family.

In 1915, Mary Leary Langston died, leaving Langston to be raised briefly by his mother and stepfather, and then by Mary's friends, the Reeds. After her death, Hughes recalled

Through my grandmother's stories always life moved, moved heroically toward an end. Nobody ever cried in my grandmother's stories. They worked, or schemed, or fought. But no crying. When my grandmother died, I didn't cry, either. Something about my grandmother's stories (without her ever having said so) taught me the uselessness of crying about anything.

== Legacy ==
Aunt Sue has a head full of stories.
Aunt Sue has a whole heart full of stories.
Summer nights on the front porch
Aunt Sue cuddles a brown-faced child to her bosom
And tells him stories.
–Langston Hughes, from "Aunt Sue's Stories"

Langston Hughes was inspired by his grandmother in much of his poetry, most notably "Aunt Sue's Stories." The character of the story-telling grandmother is also present in Not Without Laughter in the character of Aunt Hager.

Mary Langston also served as inspiration for Erica Dawson's poem "Langston Hughes's Grandma Mary Writes a Love Letter to Lewis Leary Years after He Dies Fighting at Harper's Ferry."
