= Alfred Newton Handy =

Mississippi state legislator

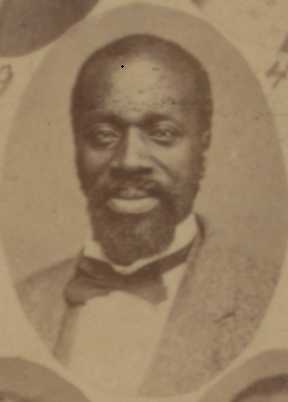

Alfred Newton Handy was a minister, landowner, and state legislator in Mississippi.

He was born in Georgia. He represented Madison County, Mississippi in the Mississippi House of Representatives from 1870 to 1875.

He served with David Jenkins, an African American who also represented Madison County in the Mississippi House.

== See also ==
- African American officeholders from the end of the Civil War until before 1900
