= Lewis Sheridan Leary =

American abolitionist (1835–1859)

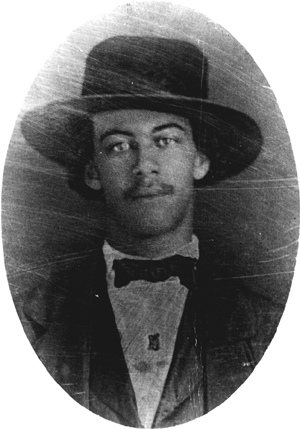
- Born: March 17, 1835; Fayetteville, North Carolina, U.S.
- Died: October 20, 1859 (aged 24); Harper's Ferry, Virginia, U.S.
- Resting place: North Elba, New York, U.S.
- Known for: Oberlin-Wellington Rescue; Raid on Harpers Ferry
- Spouse: Mary Sampson Patterson Leary Langston (married 1858-59)
- Children: Louisa

Lewis Sheridan Leary (March 17, 1835 – October 20, 1859) was an African-American harnessmaker from Oberlin, Ohio, who joined John Brown's raid on Harpers Ferry, where he was killed.

== Life ==
Leary's father was a free born African-American harnessmaker. Lewis Leary was born at Fayetteville, North Carolina. His paternal grandparents were an Irishman, Jeremiah O'Leary, who fought in the American Revolution under General Nathanael Greene, and his wife of African, European, and theorized Croatan descent. His great grandfather, Aaron Revels, also fought in the revolution. Through Revels, he was a cousin to Hiram Rhodes Revels, the first African-American to serve in the United States Senate. His brother was North Carolina politician and lawyer, John S. Leary.

In 1857, Lewis Leary moved to Oberlin. There he married Mary Patterson, an African-American graduate of Oberlin College. Leary became involved with abolitionists in Oberlin, which had an active community. Later, he met John Brown in Cleveland, Ohio.

In 1858, Leary participated in the Oberlin-Wellington Rescue, when fugitive slave John Price was forcibly taken from the custody of a U.S. Marshal to prevent his being returned to slavery in the South. Leary was not among the 37 men (12 of them free blacks) who were indicted and jailed for their actions. As a result of negotiations between state officials (who had arrested the US Marshal and his party) and federal officials, only Simon Bushnell and Charles Henry Langston were tried; both were convicted, and served light sentences, in part because of Langston's eloquent speech in their defense.

Leary may have been the first recruit from Oberlin to join Brown's army. He left Mary and their six-month-old daughter Lois at home. Accompanied by John A. Copeland, Leary went to Chambersburg, Pennsylvania, to join Brown. Leary died eight days after the attack from wounds suffered in the conflict at Harper's Ferry. Copeland was captured, tried and later executed. After Leary's death, the abolitionists James Redpath (editor for the New York Tribune) and Wendell Phillips helped raise money for Mary and Louise Leary's support and the girl's education.

In 1869 the widow Mary Patterson Leary married again, to the Ohio abolitionist Charles Henry Langston. The family moved to Lawrence, Kansas, where they remained for the rest of their lives. In 1872 Charles and Mary's daughter Caroline Mercer Langston was born. She would become the mother of the renowned poet Langston Hughes.

== Death ==
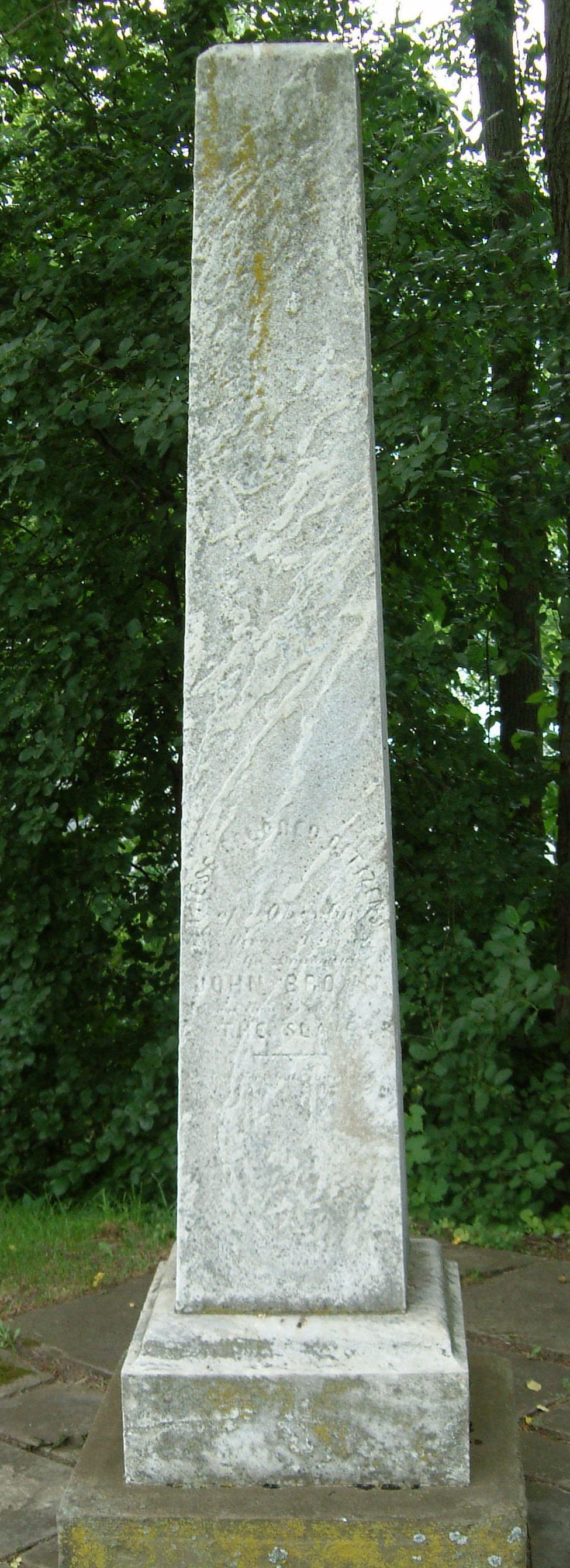
Monument honoring Copeland, Green, and Leary

During the Harpers Ferry raid, Leary was mortally wounded. He survived his terrible wounds for eight hours after the capture of Brown's men, during which he was well treated and able to send messages to his family. His wife had not previously known of the planned raid. He is reported as saying, "I am ready to die." His body was first buried with 7 others killed in a pit along the Shenandoah (see John Brown's raiders). In 1899 his body was reburied with most of the others killed next to John Brown's grave, at the John Brown Farm State Historic Site in North Elba, New York.

== Legacy and honors ==
A memorial service was held in Oberlin for Leary, John A. Copeland, and Shields Green, on December 25, 1859. The latter two had been executed after being convicted at trial following the raid.

In 1865 after the Civil War, a monument was erected in Westwood Cemetery at Oberlin to honor the three. The monument was moved in 1977 to Martin Luther King Jr. Park on Vine Street. The inscription reads:

These colored citizens of Oberlin, the heroic associates of the immortal John Brown, gave their lives for the slave. Et nunc servitudo etiam mortua est, laus deo (And now slavery is also dead, praise be to God).

S. Green died at Charleston, Va., Dec. 16, 1859, age 23 years.

J. A. Copeland died at Charleston, Va., Dec. 16, 1859, age 25 years.

L. S. Leary died at Harper's Ferry, Va., Oct 20, 1859, age 24 years.

== See also ==
- John Brown's raiders
