= West Shore Conference =

Defunct high school athletic league in Ohio, USA

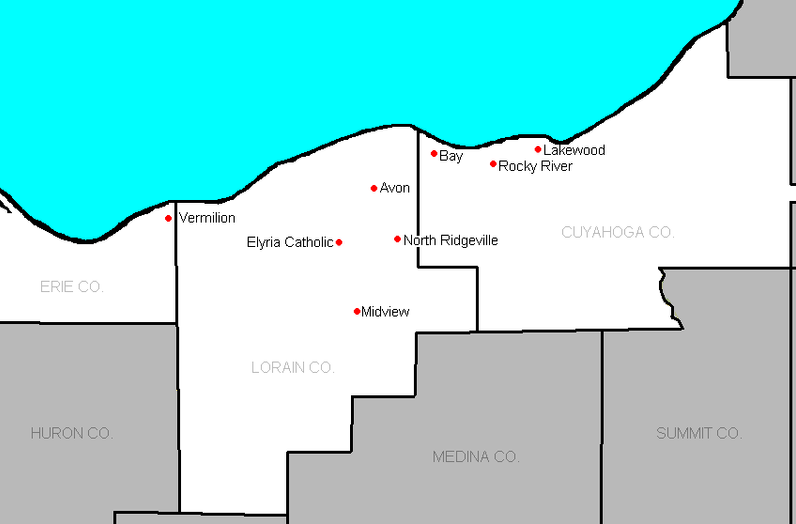
The member schools of the West Shore Conference in 2012-13.

The West Shore Conference was a high school athletic conference located in northeast Ohio, with member schools stretched across Cuyahoga, Erie, and Lorain counties.

== Members when the league folded ==
School	Nickname	Location	Colors	Type	Notes
Avon	Eagles	Avon	Purple & Gold	Public	Left for the SWC in 2015–2016.
Bay	Rockets	Bay Village	Blue & White	Public	Left for the new GLC in 2015–2016.
Elyria Catholic	Panthers	Elyria	Green & White	Parochial	Left for the new GLC in 2015–2016.
Lakewood	Rangers	Lakewood	Purple & Gold	Public	Left for the SWC in 2015–2016.
Midview	Middies	Grafton	Blue & Silver	Public	Left for the SWC in 2015–2016.
North Ridgeville	Rangers	North Ridgeville	Navy Blue & Gold	Public	Left for the SWC in 2015–2016.
Rocky River	Pirates	Rocky River	Maroon & White	Public	Left for the new GLC in 2015–2016.
Vermilion	Sailors	Vermilion	Purple & Vegas Gold	Public	Left for the SBC in 2016–2017.

== See also ==
- Ohio High School Athletic Conferences

== Notes ==
- It was reported in November 2012 that Avon sought membership in the Southwestern Conference for the 2013–2014 school year to accommodate the merger of Berea and Midpark. In December 2012, the Southwestern Conference approved Avon's addition for the 2015–2016 school year.
- In March 2013, Lakewood and Midview were also approved for admission into the Southwestern Conference for the 2015–2016 school year.
- In October 2013, North Ridgeville replaced Brecksville-Broadview Heights in the 2015–2016 school year.
- On December 10, 2014, Vermilion announced plans to join the Sandusky Bay Conference beginning with the 2016–2017 school year as part of the SBC's expansion plans.
