= C. K. Fauver =

American football coach (1872–1942)

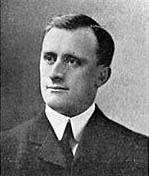
- Fauver during the time he was baseball coach at Western Spartans

Biographical details
- Born: August 1, 1872; North Eaton, Ohio, U.S.
- Died: March 3, 1942 (aged 69); Chatsworth, Georgia, U.S.

Playing career

Football
- 1892–1895: Oberlin

Baseball
- 1893–1896: Oberlin
- 1899: Louisville Colonels
- 1900: Cleveland Lake Shores
- Positions: Tackle, halfback (football); Pitcher (baseball)

Coaching career (HC unless noted)

Football
- 1895: Miami (OH)
- 1896: Oberlin

Baseball
- 1902: Western Reserve

Head coaching record
- Overall: 8–3–1 (football); 5–6 (baseball)

Clayton King Fauver (August 1, 1872 – March 3, 1942) was an American college football coach during the late 19th century. In 1895, he became the first paid coach at Miami University in Oxford, Ohio. In 1896, Fauver served as the head coach at Oberlin College, compiling a record of 5–3–1. Fauver was also a Major League pitcher for the Louisville Colonels.

== Early life and family ==
Fauver was born on August 1, 1872, in North Eaton, Ohio. He was the son of Alfred and Elizabeth (King) Fauver. He lived in North Eaton until his family moved to Oberlin, Ohio, where he attended Oberlin Academy. Fauver father was a prominent citizen in Lorain County, Ohio, where he served as Lorain County commissioner and Mayor of the town of Oberlin. Clayton Fauver had several siblings including Alfred Fauver, a former Lorain County Surveyor, Louis B. Fauver who played football with Clayton Fauver at Oberlin, and twin brothers, Edward Fauver and Edgar Fauver, who were both were well-known coaches and college athletic administrators.

== College student and athlete ==
Fauver entered Oberlin College in 1893 and graduated Phi Beta Kappa in 1897. He was active on campus including being on the debate team, assistant editor of the student newspaper and manager of the annual yearbook. A talented athlete, he played varsity football and baseball and was captain of the football team in 1893 and 1894, and captain of the baseball team in 1896.

=== Football player ===
Fauver earned a varsity letter in football at Oberlin in 1892, 1893, 1894 and 1895. In 1892, Fauver was not a student at the college but a student at the Oberlin Academy, a college preparatory school run by the college. He still played on the college football team, which included his brother Louis B. Fauver, a 24-year-old freshman, and was coached by John W. Heisman. This team was captained by its quarterback Carl Sheldon Williams and finished the season undefeated with a record of 7–0 including a season with an opening victory over Ohio State University. (Note: During 1892 Oberlin claims a second victory over the Ohio State. Ohio State does not acknowledge playing the game.) (Note: During 1892 Oberlin claims a 24–22 victory over the University of Michigan. Michigan claims it won their game by a score of 26–24.) After winning its first six games against teams from Ohio, Oberlin crossed the border to play regional power Michigan. In a controversial game known for rough and dirty play, including a Michigan player being kicked out for punching an Oberlin player and the Umpire, Oberlin claimed a 24 to 22 win. Because of injuries to other players, Fauver helped the Yeoman effort by playing two positions. In middle game he moved from left tackle to right tackle. The game ended with a dispute over the time remaining. Oberlin contended the game was over resulting in an Oberlin win. Michigan contended there was still time left. Oberlin left the field so they could catch a train back to Ohio. Michigan stayed on the field and ran a play with no opposition that resulted in a touchdown. Both teams claimed victory. Oberlin finished the season with a 16–0 victory over Western Reserve.

In 1893, Fauver was elected captain of the varsity football team after Will Merriam resigned. The team was coached by Everett B. Camp and finished with a 6–1 record including victories over Ohio State, Chicago and Illinois. Fauver helped by scoring a touchdown against Ohio State and blocking a punt against Chicago. Oberlin won the first 6 games but lost the last one to Case Institute of Technology by a score of 8–22. The team was hampered by injuries and lack of practice due to exams. The injuries forced Fauver to move from the line to the backfield for the game.

Before the 1894 season Fauver brought national attention to Oberlin by being featured in Spalding Athletic Equipment Company football guide. The 1894 Oberlin Yeomen were again coached by John W. Heisman. Fauver once again was elected captain, but Heisman moved him from the tackle to right halfback. The team finished with a record of 4–3–1. Fauver was injured late in season in a loss to Adelbert College, also known then as Western Reserve. He missed the Michigan game but returned to his right half back position for a victory over Penn State University. This victory was short lived when Walter Camp later overruled the game officials allowing a game winning kick by Penn State.

Fauver once again played on Oberlin varsity football team in 1895. The team finished with a record of 4–1–1 under former Yale University player William M. Richards. The record allowed it to self proclaim the team as champion of Ohio.

== College coach ==
In 1895, before he graduated from Oberlin, Fauver was hired by Miami University in Oxford, Ohio, to coach the football team. He arrived two days before the Wittenberg game and stay three weeks. In addition to coaching, Fauver also suited up and played in games. The Miami University student newspaper praised his play versus Wittenberg for being "in almost every play" and credited him for knocking down six player in one play. Fauver is credited with an undefeated record of 3–0 with victories over Wittenberg, Butler, and Cincinnati. (Note: There is conflicting information on the exact record of the 1895 Miami University football team. Miami University media guide list the 1895 season record as 3–0 with victories over Wittenberg, Butler and Cincinnati. The December 1895 edition of the Miami Student show 3 additional games with victories over Hamilton YMCA and Hamilton and a loss to Wabash College. The 2009 Wabash College Football Media Guide list confirms loss for Miami in 1895. cfbdatawarehouse.com shows a 3–1 record for Miami with the loss Wabash to listed but the victories over Hamilton and Hamilton YMCA not listed.)

In 1896, Fauver served as the head coach at Oberlin College, compiling a record of 5–3–1. All of Fauver's losses came to regional powers Michigan, Illinois and Chicago His victories all came against teams from Ohio including a 16–0 win against Ohio State. The only other blemish was his team also tied in-state rival Western Reserve by a score of 6–6 after beating them yearly in the year by a score of 4–0. This record allowed Oberlin to claim the 1896 Ohio State Championship.

Fauver returned to coaching in 1902. While teaching law, he became the head baseball coach at Western Reserve. In his only season he compiled a 6–5 record.

=== Head coaching record ===
Year	Team	Overall	Conference	Standing	Bowl/playoffs
Miami Redskins (Independent) (1895)
1895	Miami	3–0			
Miami:		3–0			
Oberlin Yeomen (Independent) (1896)
1896	Oberlin	5–3–1			
Oberlin:		5–3–1			
Total:		8–3–1			

== Professional baseball ==
Clay Fauver
- Pitcher
- Batted: Both Threw: Right

MLB debut
- September 7, 1899, for the Louisville Colonels

Last MLB appearance
- September 7, 1899, for the Louisville Colonels

MLB statistics
- Win–loss record: 1–0
- Earned run average: 0.00
- Strikeouts: 1
- Stats at Baseball Reference

Teams
- Louisville Colonels (1899)

During the time he was attending law school in Cleveland, Fauver played Major League Baseball for the Louisville Colonels. On September 7. 1899 played his first and only Major League game. Fauver started at pitcher against the Pittsburgh Pirates. He threw a complete game with no earned runs. The following season, he played for the Cleveland Lake Shores of the American League (pre Major League status). He pitched in 10 games with a 4–6 record. He also batted .206 scoring 2 runs for the Lake Shores.

== Attorney ==
In 1900 Fauver received a LL. B. from Western Reserve Law School in Cleveland, Ohio. He stayed in Cleveland where he was an attorney as well as teaching law at Western Reserve. In 1916 he moved to New York City where he continued his legal career where he specialized in import and export trade law. During this time he became Vice-President and General Counsel of Gaston Williams and Wigmore. From 1931 to 1933 he was a partner in the New Rochelle, New York firm of Fauver, Albertson & Schoble.

== Return to Oberlin ==
Even with living in Cleveland and New York, Fauver was still involved with Oberlin. In 1920 he became a trustee of Oberlin College. In 1933 he returned to the city of Oberlin as both an investment executive for the college as well as the President of Oberlin Savings Bank. On March 3, 1942, Fauver died of coronary thrombosis while travelling from Ohio to Florida. He had stopped in Chatsworth, Georgia, for the night because of a snow storm. While preparing to continue his journey the next morning, he collapsed on the stairs of the hotel.
