= Southwestern Conference (Ohio) =

High school athletic conference

The Southwestern Conference is an Ohio High School Athletic Association athletic league that began conference play in 1937 and is made up of member schools of Cuyahoga and Lorain counties in Ohio.

== Current members ==
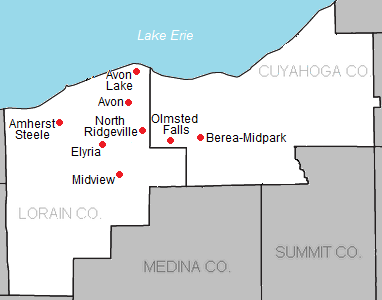
League members for the 2021-22 school year.

School	Nickname	Location	Colors	Tenure	Notes
Avon	Eagles	Avon	Purple & gold	2015–	
Avon Lake	Shoremen	Avon Lake	Maroon & gold	1964–	
Berea-Midpark	Titans	Berea	Blue & orange	2013–	
Elyria	Pioneers	Elyria	Red & white	2021–	
Marion L. Steele	Comets	Amherst	Forest green & gold	1947–1958; 1986–	
Midview	Middies	Grafton	Blue & silver	2015–	
North Ridgeville	Rangers	North Ridgeville	Navy blue & yellow	2015–	
Olmsted Falls	Bulldogs	Olmsted Falls	Navy blue & yellow	1954–	

== Former members ==
School	Nickname	Location	Colors	Tenure	Notes
Bay	Rockets	Bay Village	Blue, white and red	1954–2005	left for West Shore
Berea	Braves	Berea	Scarlet and blue	1937–1950; 2005–2013	left in 1950 for Greater Cleveland, consolidated into Berea-Midpark
Brecksville-Broadview Heights	Bees	Broadview Heights	Crimson and gold	2005–2015	left for Suburban
Clearview	Clippers	Lorain	Blue and gold	1945–1954	left for Lakeland
Fairview	Warriors	Fairview Park	Scarlet and gray	1940–2005	left for West Shore
Medina	Bees	Medina	Green and gold	1947–1986	left for Pioneer
Midpark	Meteors	Middlesburg Heights	Brown and orange	2005–2013	consolidated into Berea-Midpark
North Olmsted	Eagles	North Olmsted	Orange and black	1954–2021	left for Great Lakes
Oberlin	Indians	Oberlin	Blue, white and red	1937–1964	left for Lakeland
Lakewood	Rangers	Lakewood	Purple & gold	2015–2020	left for Great Lakes
Rocky River	Pirates	Rocky River	Maroon and white	1937–2005	left for West Shore
Wellington	Dukes	Wellington	Maroon and white	1945–1954	left for Lakeland
Westlake	Demons	Westlake	Forest Green and white	1954–2021	left for Great Lakes

=== Membership Timeline ===
Source:

== History ==
The Southwestern Conference (SWC) was established during the 1937 school year with founding members Berea, Oberlin, and Rocky River. Three years later, in 1940, Fairview joined the league. Expansion continued in 1945 with the addition of Wellington and Clearview. Just two years later, in 1947, Medina and Steele were also admitted, further strengthening the conference.

The SWC saw its first major change in 1950 when founding member Berea departed for the Greater Cleveland Conference. In 1954, Olmsted Falls, Westlake, and Bay joined the league, replacing Clearview, Steele, and Wellington, which had left for the Lakeland Conference.

In 1964, Avon Lake became a member of the SWC, while founding member Oberlin exited the conference that same year.

The conference remained relatively stable until 1986, when Steele rejoined the SWC, coinciding with Medina’s departure to the Pioneer Conference.

A significant shift occurred in 2005 when Bay, Fairview, and the final founding member, Rocky River, left to form the West Shore Conference. To fill the void, Brecksville-Broadview Heights and Midpark were added that same year.

Another major transition came in the 2013–2014 school year, when Midpark High School merged with Berea High School to create Berea-Midpark High School. To accommodate this change, Avon High School joined the SWC in 2015–2016, along with Lakewood and Midview. During this period, Brecksville-Broadview Heights accepted an invitation to join the Suburban League in 2013 and departed the SWC after the 2014–2015 school year. North Ridgeville was subsequently approved to join the conference in 2015–2016 as its replacement.

In 2019, Lakewood announced it would leave the SWC following the 2019–2020 school year to join the Great Lakes Conference. Elyria was then accepted as its replacement, beginning in the 2021–2022 season. Further changes came in February 2020, when North Olmsted and Westlake announced their departures from the SWC to also join the Great Lakes Conference starting in the 2021–2022 school year.
