= Steele High School =

Steele High School may refer to:

- Steele High School, Dayton, Ohio
- Byron P. Steele II High School, Cibolo, Texas
- Marion L. Steele High School, Amherst, Ohio
