= Luke S. Johnson =

Luke S. Johnson may refer to:

- Luke Johnson (Mormon), leader in the Latter Day Saint movement
- Luke S. Johnson (politician), member of the Michigan House of Representatives
