= John A. Spitzer =

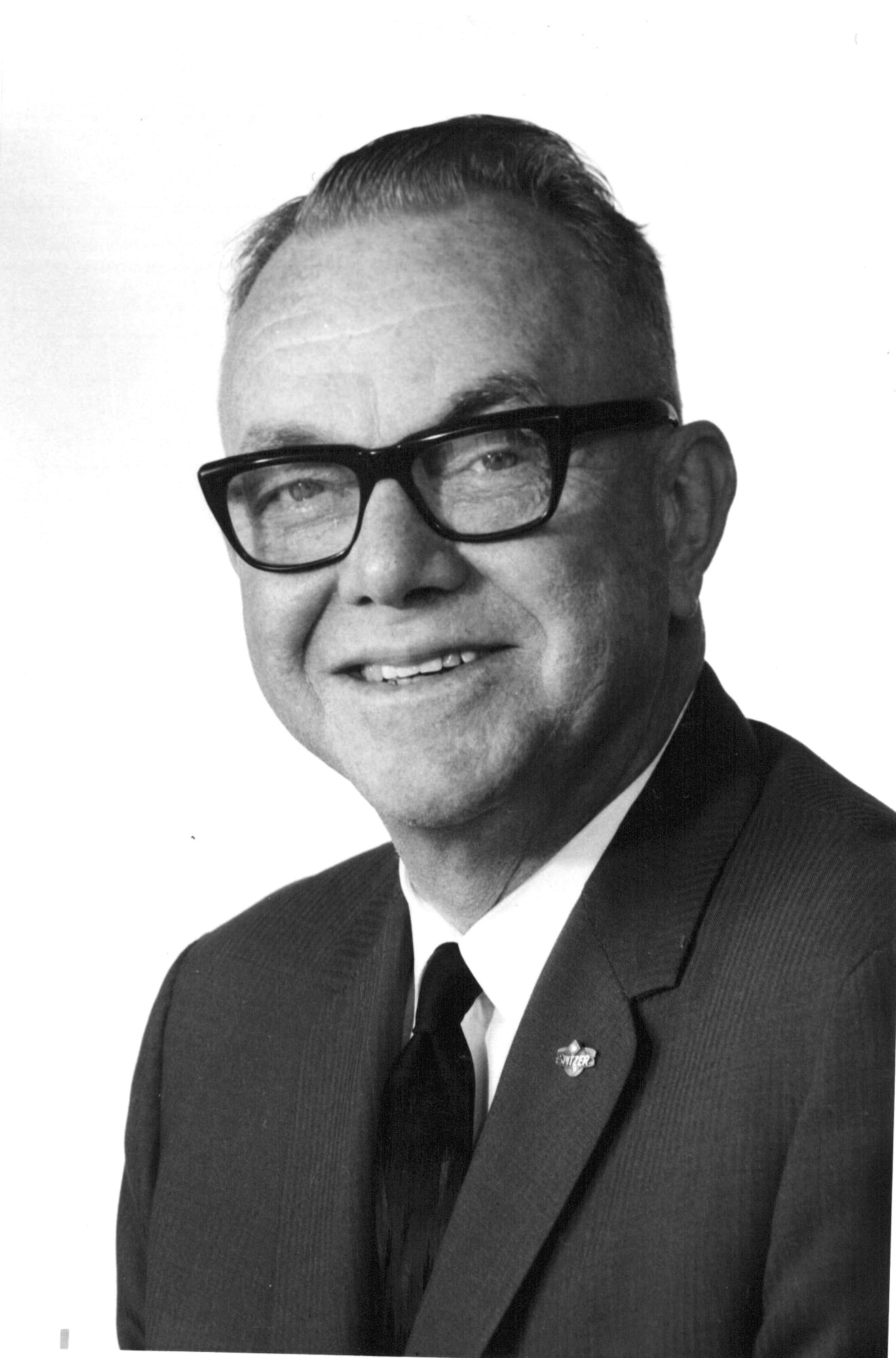
- John A. Spitzer in 1970
- Born: February 1, 1917; Grafton, Ohio, U.S.
- Died: July 29, 1992 (aged 75)
- Education: Ohio State University
- Occupation: Businessman
- Known for: Developing sales techniques, which were later shared in a Ford educational film
- Spouse: Helen C. Spitzer

John A. Spitzer (February 1, 1917 – July 29, 1992) was an American automotive executive and real estate developer.

Born in 1917, Grafton, Ohio, Spitzer graduated from Ohio State University and, with his brother Del, expanded Spitzer Automotive into one of the leading automotive dealer in the U.S. A World War II veteran, he developed innovative sales techniques, which were later shared in a Ford educational film.

== Biography ==
=== Early life and family ===
Spitzer was born in 1917 in Grafton. His parents, George and Harriet Spitzer, operated a hardware store and managed a Ford dealership at the beginning of the 20th century. He was educated at the Ohio State University and graduated with a degree in accounting in 1939.

Spitzer was married to Helen C. Spitzer. They had seven children, including Alan Spitzer, who is the current chairman and chief executive officer (CEO) of Spitzer Management.

=== Career ===
From an early age, Spitzer became involved in his family's hardware store and car dealership in Grafton, Ohio. He was assigned by his father, George Spitzer, to liquidate the dealership but chose to revive it instead. During World War II, he served in the United States Army Air Corps as a military officer and eventually rose to the rank of captain.

After the World War II, he established a Dodge dealership in Elyria, Lorain County, leading to substantial expansion across Ohio and three other states. He developed the automotive division of the company, alongside his brother Del Spitzer, who contributed to advancements in sales processes and TV advertising. In the late 1950s, Ford Motor Company allocated a new store in Cleveland to Spitzer, which rapidly grew into Ohio's leading Ford retail outlet. To assess their sales methods, Ford assigned mystery shoppers, one of whom purchased a vehicle. Subsequently, Ford engaged John and Del Spitzer in producing a two-hour educational film to share their sales techniques with other Ford dealers.

In the 1950s, Spitzer developed a residential neighborhood near Grafton, acquiring land to construct over 200 homes in an area formerly known as Brentwood Lake Village.

== Recognition ==
- Spitzer Conference Center is named after him
