= Ross Douglas (American football) =

American football coach (born 1994)

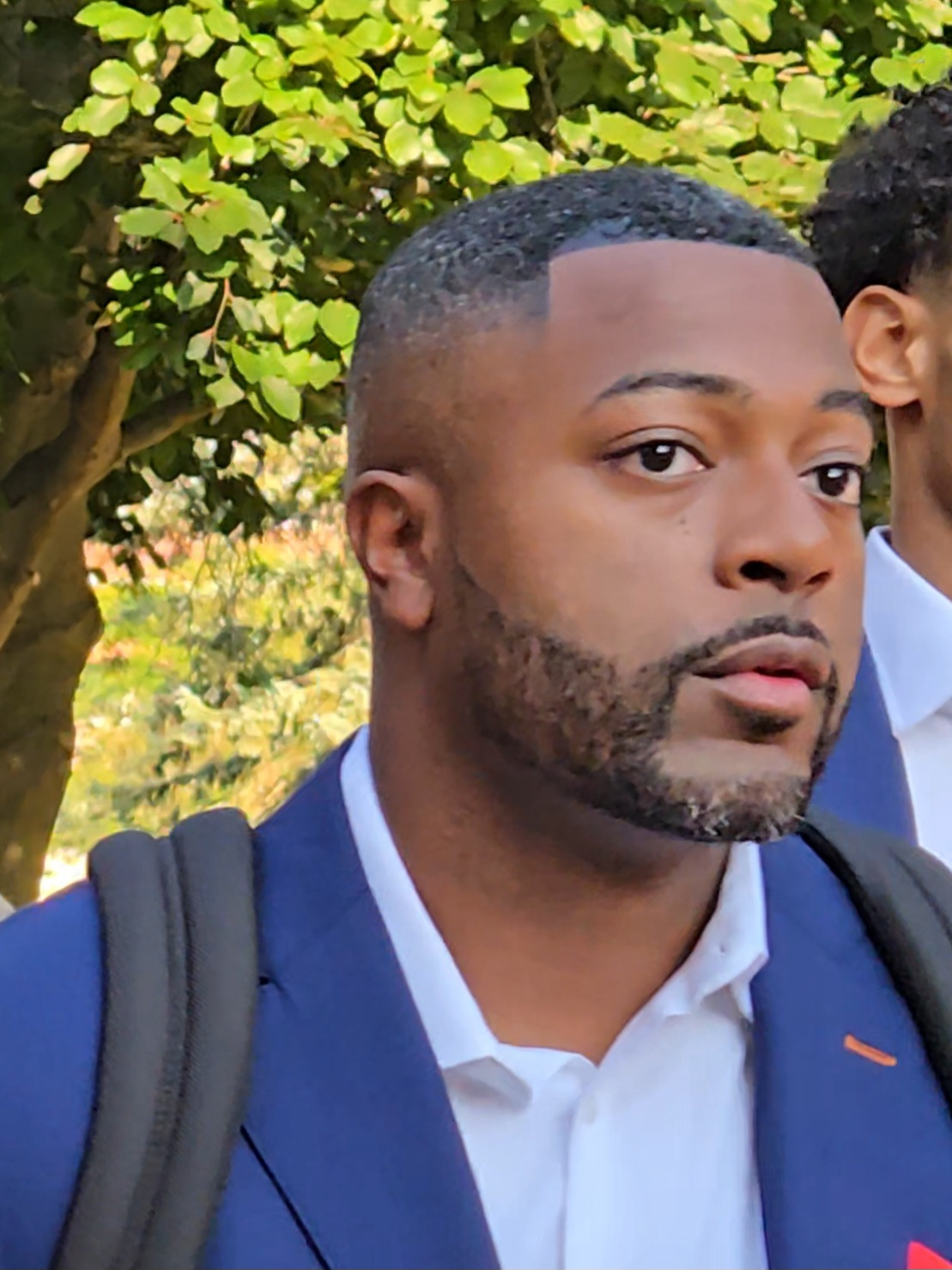
- Douglas with the Syracuse Orange in 2024

Oregon Ducks
- Title: Wide receivers coach

Personal information
- Born: December 3, 1994 (age 31)
- Listed height: 5 ft 10 in (1.78 m)
- Listed weight: 186 lb (84 kg)

Career information
- High school: Avon (Avon, Ohio)
- College: Michigan (2013–2015); Rutgers (2016–2017)
- NFL draft: 2018: undrafted

Career history
- Rutgers (2018–2020) Graduate assistant; Richmond (2021) Corner backs coach; New England Patriots (2021) Defensive quality control coach; New England Patriots (2022) Assistant wide receivers coach; New England Patriots (2023) Wide receivers coach; Syracuse (2024) Wide receivers coach; Oregon (2025–present) Wide receivers coach

Ross Trevoy Douglas Sr. (born December 3, 1994) is an American football coach and former player who is the wide receivers coach for the Oregon Ducks football team. He previously worked in the same position for the New England Patriots of the National Football League (NFL). Having played his college career at Michigan and Rutgers in a variety of offensive and defensive positions, he went undrafted in the 2018 NFL draft and began a career in coaching. Having served as a graduate assistant at Rutgers until the end of 2020, he briefly became cornerbacks coach at Richmond before accepting a Bill Walsh Diversity Coaching Fellowship with the New England Patriots.

== Playing career ==
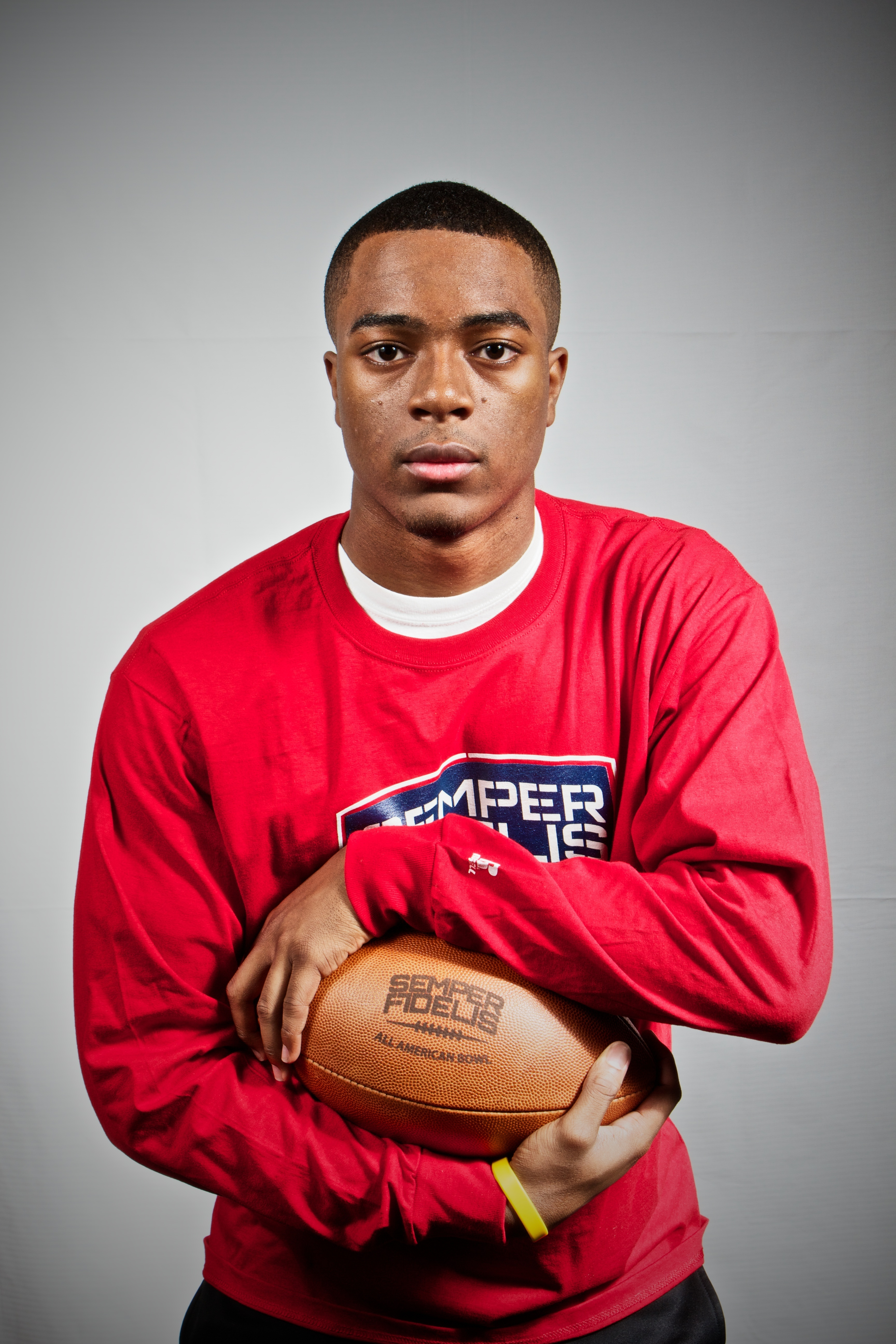
Semper Fidelis All-American Bowl player portrait of Douglas in 2012.

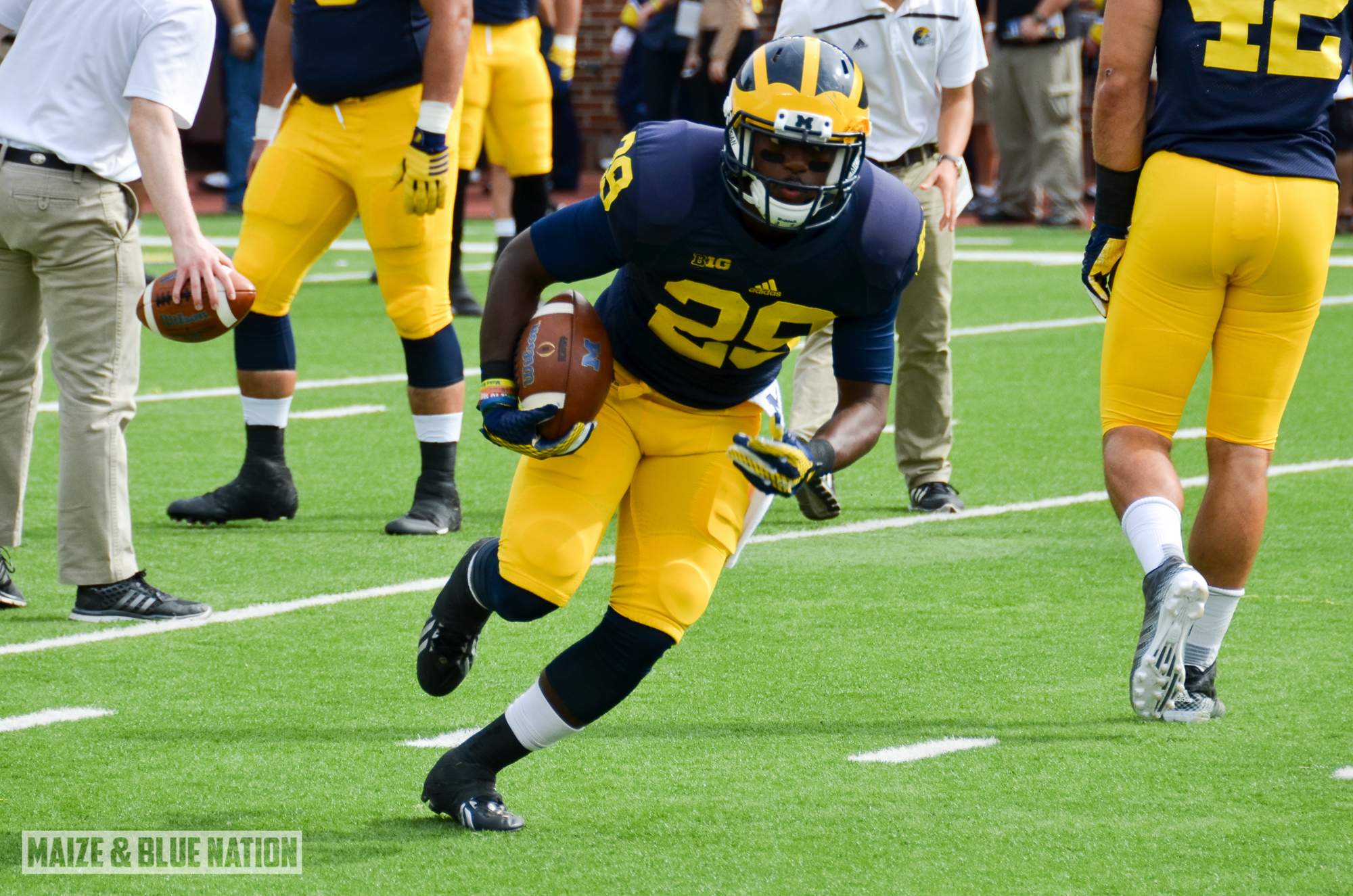
Douglas with Michigan Wolverines in 2015.

Ross Douglas went to high school in Avon, Ohio. A three star prospect at cornerback, he committed to play for the University of Michigan in 2012. Over three seasons in Michigan, Douglas struggled to find a definitive position, playing defensive back, wide receiver, and running back. He played in 18 games for the Wolverines before in April 2016 he transferred to Rutgers University. There Douglas played as a hybrid safety/linebacker, and over two seasons had 13 starts and played in 22 games. Having already completed his undergraduate degree at Michigan, Douglas completed his years of eligibility at Rutgers at the end of 2017, graduating with a masters degree. He went undrafted in the 2018 NFL draft, failing a try-out with the Pittsburgh Steelers at rookie minicamp.

== Coaching career ==
=== Rutgers and Richmond ===
Douglas chose to disregard further attempts to play in the National Football League (NFL) and instead went back to Rutgers as a coach. Under Chris Ash Douglas initially served in the recruiting department before becoming a graduate assistant on defense. Douglas was kept on when Greg Schiano took over in 2020, continuing in his role on defense. After the end of the 2020 season Douglas accepted a position as cornerbacks coach with the University of Richmond.

=== New England Patriots ===
Douglas stayed at Richmond only briefly; having come to the attention of the New England Patriots he received a Bill Walsh Diversity Coaching Fellowship in June, replacing Cole Popovich.

At the end of the 2020 minicamp, Douglas was offered a full-time role by the Patriots, working on defense in quality control. In 2021, several assistant coaches left the team for the Las Vegas Raiders under ex-offensive coordinator Josh McDaniels. Douglas was subsequently moved to work with the Patriots wide receivers. Before the start of the 2022 season Patriots head coach Bill Belichick initially declined to reveal the exact titles taken on by his assistant coaches, with it being suggested that Douglas would become the wide receivers coach.

=== Syracuse Orange ===
In December 2023, Douglas was hired by the incoming head coach Fran Brown as the wide receivers coach for the Syracuse Orange football team.

=== Oregon Ducks ===
Oregon football head coach Dan Lanning announced the hiring of Ross Douglas as the Ducks' new wide receivers coach and pass game coordinator on Feb. 20, 2025.

== Personal life ==
Douglas and his wife Kaylyn welcomed their first child—a son named Ross Jr., nicknamed RJ—in 2023.
