= Midview High School =

Ohio public high school in Eaton Township

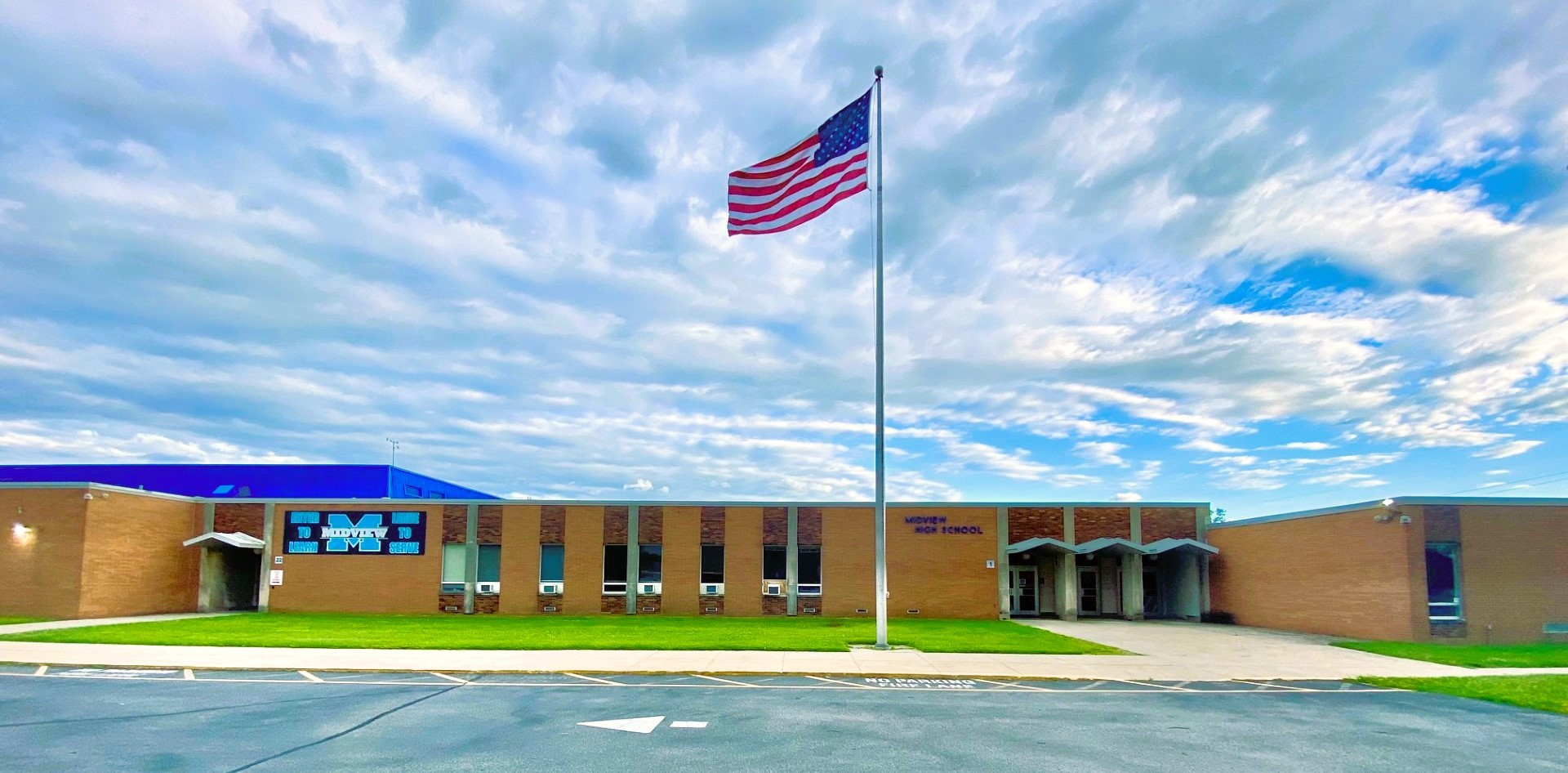

Location
- 38199 Capel Road; Grafton, Ohio 44044; United States
- 41°18′9″N 82°3′47″W

Information
- Type: Public
- Established: 1955
- School district: Midview Local School District
- NCES School ID: 390481703140
- Principal: Chad Heuser
- Teaching staff: 51.50 (FTE)
- Grades: 9–12
- Enrollment: 727 (2024–25)
- Student to teacher ratio: 14.12
- Campus type: Rural
- Colors: Blue and silver
- Slogan: “Enter to learn, leave to serve”
- Athletics conference: Southwestern Conference
- Mascot: Middie Man
- Team name: Middies
- Rival: North Ridgeville High School
- Accreditation: Ohio Department of Education
- Newspaper: The Midviewer
- Communities served: Eaton Township, Grafton, Grafton Township, and East Carlisle
- Website: www.midviewk12.org/o/mhs

Midview High School is a public high school located in Eaton Township, just north of Grafton, Ohio, United States. It serves students in grades 9 through 12 and is the only high school in the Midview Local School District.

== History ==
Midview High School was established in 1955 as part of the consolidation of the Eaton Local, Grafton Local, Grafton Village, and East Carlisle Local school districts, which had occurred in 1953. The class of 1956 was the first to graduate from MHS.

Midview High School's core curriculum includes classes in language arts, international studies (French, Spanish, and ASL), math, science, business, social sciences, health and physical education, art, music (instrumental and vocal), and vocational and occupational studies (industrial, technology, and home economics). The high school is also certified in learning and developmental disabilities programs, with programs like the Middie Café and Harbor of Hope.

Midview offers College Credit Plus through Lorain County Community College and also has a partnership with the Lorain County Joint Vocational School. Midview also has a notable selection of Advanced Placement classes, including AP Art, AP Government, and AP US History.

== Athletics ==
The school colors are blue and silver. The athletic teams are known as the Middies. Since 2015, Midview has been a member of the Southwestern Conference. Midview was a previous member of the now defunct West Shore Conference

Fall

- Cheerleading (varsity, JV, and freshmen)
- Cross country (boys and girls varsity)
- Football (varsity, JV, and freshmen)
- Girls tennis (varsity and JV)
- Golf (boys and girls varsity, boys JV)
- Soccer (boys and girls varsity and JV)
- Volleyball (varsity, JV, and freshmen)

Winter

- Basketball (boys and girls, varsity, JV, and freshmen)
- Bowling (boys and girls)
- Cheerleading (Sparkle, Game Day, basketball varsity, JV, and freshmen)
- Gymnastics
- Ice hockey (varsity only)
- Skippers
- Swimming
- Wrestling (girls and boys varsity and JV)

Spring

- Baseball (varsity, JV, and freshmen)
- Boys tennis (varsity)
- Boys volleyball
- Girls flag football
- Softball (varsity, JV, and freshmen)
- Track and field (boys and girls varsity only)

== Organizations ==
Clubs & Activities

- Academic Quiz Team
- Air Force JROTC (Drone Club, Color Guard, and Raider)
- Art Club
- Best Buddies
- Book Club
- Broadcasting
- Car Club
- Class Crew
- Drama Club and International Thespian Society
- Future Business Leaders of America (FBLA)
- Hall of Honor Student Selection Committee
- Hats for Humanity
- International Club – World Languages
- Journalism
- Key Club
- Link Crew
- LOVE Club
- Midview Fellowship of Christian Athletes (FCA)
- Midview Marching Blue
- National Art Honors Society
- National Honor Society
- Newspaper
- Photography Club
- PLTW (Biomed and Engineering)
- SkillsUSA
- Student Council
- Tri-M
- Yearbook

Music Groups

- Band 1 & Band 2
- Jazz Band
- Chamber Choir
- Chorale
- Midview Express

== Notable alumni ==
- Tom Batiuk, Comic strip creator of Funky Winkerbean
- Dustin Crum, professional football player in the Canadian Football League (CFL)
- Ryan Feierabend, professional baseball pitcher in Major League Baseball (MLB)
- Dan Knechtges, Tony Award-nominated choreographer
- Eric Lauer, professional baseball pitcher in MLB
- Joe Staysniak, sports radio talk show host and professional football player in the NFL
