= Joe Staysniak =

American football player (born 1966)

No. 79, 68, 78
- Positions: Guard, tackle

Personal information
- Born: December 8, 1966 (age 59); Elyria, Ohio, U.S.
- Listed height: 6 ft 4 in (1.93 m)
- Listed weight: 292 lb (132 kg)

Career information
- High school: Midview (Grafton, Ohio)
- College: Ohio State
- NFL draft: 1990: 7th round, 185th overall pick

Career history
- San Diego Chargers (1990)*; Buffalo Bills (1991); Kansas City Chiefs (1992); Indianapolis Colts (1992–1995); Green Bay Packers (1996)*; Arizona Cardinals (1996)
- * Offseason or practice squad member only

Awards and highlights
- First-team All-Big Ten (1989)

Career NFL statistics
- Games played: 63
- Games started: 33
- Fumble recoveries: 2
- Stats at Pro Football Reference

Joseph Andrew Staysniak (born December 8, 1966) is an American former sports radio talk show host and a former professional football offensive lineman who played six seasons in the National Football League (NFL). He played college football for the Ohio State Buckeyes and was selected by the San Diego Chargers in the seventh round of the 1990 NFL draft. Staysniak worked for the talk radio stations WIBC (FM) and WFNI (AM) in Indianapolis until August 2021.

== Early life ==
Staysniak played high school football at Midview High School in Grafton, Ohio. After high school, he attended Ohio State University, where he was an academic standout and a member on the football team. Staysniak was part of the 1986–87 Ohio State Big Ten championship team that defeated Texas A&M in the Cotton Bowl Classic 28–12. In 1989, he was selected as one of the team captains on the Buckeyes football team. During the same season, he was also named an Academic All-American and received All-Big Ten honors. In 2015, Neil Cornrich & NC Sports, listed Staysniak number 68 on their list of Ohio State's top 100 football players of all time.

== Professional career ==
Staysniak was selected in the seventh round (185th overall) by the San Diego Chargers in the 1990 NFL draft. Although he was only a practice squad player for the Chargers, Bill Polian signed Staysniak to a contract with the Buffalo Bills. Over the course of his NFL career, he played for the Bills, the Kansas City Chiefs, the Indianapolis Colts and the Arizona Cardinals. Staysniak played in 63 games and made 33 starts during his professional career. He started all 16 games for the Indianapolis Colts during the 1994 and 1995 NFL seasons. He was part of the Colts team that advanced to the 1995 AFC Championship Game, losing to the Pittsburgh Steelers, 20–16. In the game, Staysniak recovered a fumble deep in Colts territory to keep a critical drive alive for Indianapolis.

== Radio ==
Staysniak was the co-host of a weekday morning sports radio talk show, "The Jeff and Big Joe Show," on 1070 the fan and 93.5 FM in Indianapolis.

In 2014, he stated that he is against the notion of paying college athletes:

“This just really infuriates me because apparently I was one of the extreme few that actually cherished my scholarship and went to get the education that everybody else had to pay for. I scream at the top of my lungs every day when some of these guys are screaming for more money, more money, more money. I think it’s absolutely ridiculous, but once again, I think it’s kind of the way our country has gone. We want more, but we want to do less. I think it’s terrible."

In reaction to the George Floyd Protests, on Wednesday June 3, 2020, Staysniak stated on his radio show that Black people needed to stop "being a victim," and that he found it "harder and harder to believe [Black people] are being targeted" by the police. During the same show he also expressed his belief that kneeling in front of the American flag was a treasonous action, and that the Confederate flag was not a racist symbol. He was suspended for a week without pay.

Later that week, his apology was read on air that following Friday by co-host Jeff Rickard:

"Discussing on air the riots that are happening around the country, I shared views about systemic racism that did not give the proper and due attention to the horrible injustices experienced regularly by African Americans in our society," Staysniak said. "I did not stop to consider that my own experience being raised in a family of police officers is not the same as the experiences of so many in our community and in our county. For this I apologize."

In August 2021, Staysniak left the show the same week that co-host Rickard left for a new position at WEEI-FM 93.7 in Boston. His last show was on August 13.

== Personal life ==
Staysniak resides in Brownsburg, Indiana with his wife and child.

In 2023, he was charged with two misdemeanor counts of battery and strangulation, the former on his son and the latter on his son's boyfriend. However, he was released from jail the same day he went in.
