= Edgar Fauver =

American athlete (1875-1946)

Biographical details
- Born: May 7, 1875; North Eaton, Ohio, U.S.
- Died: April 4, 1946 (aged 70); Middletown, Connecticut, U.S.

Playing career

Football
- 1896–1898: Oberlin
- Position: End

Coaching career (HC unless noted)

Football
- 1899: Centre
- 1900–1902: Oberlin
- 1917: Wesleyan
- 1921: Wesleyan

Basketball
- 1917–1918: Wesleyan
- 1920–1922: Wesleyan

Baseball
- 1914–1922: Wesleyan

Administrative career (AD unless noted)
- 1899–1900: Centre
- 1911–1937: Wesleyan

Head coaching record
- Overall: 27–17–6 (football); 29–16 (basketball); 38–59–1 (baseball)

Edgar Fauver (May 7, 1875 – April 4, 1946) was an American athlete, coach, university administrator and medical doctor. He played football and baseball for Oberlin College in the 1890s. He later served as the athletic director at Wesleyan University from 1911 to 1937. He was also a pioneer in college athletics for women, coaching basketball and introducing baseball at Barnard College in the 1900s.

== Early years ==
Fauver was one of six children of Alfred Fauver, who served as the mayor of Oberlin, Ohio for approximately 20 years. He spent his early childhood on the family's farm in Eaton, Ohio. The family moved to Oberlin where the children were educated.

Fauver and his twin brother, Edwin Fauver, attended Oberlin College. The Fauver brothers they played at the end positions for the school's football team from 1896 to 1898. The New York Times reported that the Fauver brothers "made a fast pair." Fauver and his brother also played for the Oberlin baseball team. According to a 1936 newspaper account, Fauver was "considered the most brilliant performer in football and baseball who ever attended Oberlin College." Other siblings includes Alfred Fauver who was Lorain County Surveyor, and Clayton K. Fauver former Oberlin football coach and major league pitcher.

== Athletic coach ==
=== Centre College ===
After graduating from Oberlin in 1899, Fauver spent a year as the director of athletics at Centre College in Kentucky. He was also the gymnasium director at Centre College from 1899 to 1900.

=== Oberlin ===
He returned to Oberlin College as an assistant coach alongside his brother Edward Fauver and an instructor of Greek at the Oberlin Academy, a preparatory school located on the Oberlin campus. He also taught gymnastics at Oberlin College. Fauver remained at Oberlin from 1900 to 1903.

=== Horace Mann ===
In September 1903, Fauver became the director of the physical training department at the Horace Mann Academy in New York City. He taught at Horace Mann from 1903 to 1904.

=== Columbia ===
From 1904 to 1909, Fauver was a student at the Columbia School for Physicians and Surgeons (later known as Columbia University's College of Physicians and Surgeons). He earned his medical degree from Columbia in 1909. After receiving his degree, Fauver also served as an assistant professor of physical education at Columbia University from 1909 to 1911.

=== Women's athletics at Barnard College ===
Fauver was also a pioneer in college athletics for women. From 1905 to 1910, he coached women's basketball at Barnard College, a women's liberal arts college affiliated with Columbia University. In December 1910, The New York Times reported on Fauver's success in developing the women's basketball program at Barnard: "Barnard College students are keen for basket ball. In fact they are so keen that Dr. Edgar Fauver, the athletic coach, is beset, three times a week, by one hundred enthusiasts, all clamoring at once for a place on the teams."

In 1909, Fauver also introduced baseball at Barnard College. In June 1910, The Washington Post reported on Fauver's experiment with women's baseball:

"Baseball for college girls was introduced at Barnard College a year ago this spring by Edgar Fauver, assistant professor of physical education at Columbia University. He conceived the idea of teaching them to play the national game with a few slight modifications, and so successful was the idea that before the end of the year more than half the students were playing. This year there is even more interest in the game, which Prof. Fauver has taught to practically every girl at Barnard. From 40 to 60 girls are to be found playing nearly every day, and there is a regular series of class games in which the greatest rivalry is shown. Two other colleges for women have taken up the game this spring, and Prof. Fauver believes it will be the principal outdoor sport of practically all the colleges for women within the next few years.

=== Camp Pemigewassett ===
In 1908, Fauver and his brother Edwin founded Camp Pemigewassett in the White Mountains of New Hampshire. The camp was one of the earliest boys' camps in the United States. The Fauver brothers owned and operated the camp during the summers for more than 30 years.

=== Wesleyan ===
In 1911, Fauver accepted a position as an associate professor of physical education at Wesleyan University in Middletown, Connecticut. In 1913, Fauver became a professor and college physician in 1913. He was also the Wesleyan's director of athletics and physical education and chairman of the department of physical education from 1911 to 1937. In his 27 years at Wesleyan, Fauver coached at various times coached the school's football, basketball, baseball, swimming, and tennis teams. Fauver also served for many years as the president of Middlesex Hospital in Middletown, Connecticut.

When an outbreak of smallpox hit the Wesleyan campus in 1914, Dr. Fauver, as the college physician, personally vaccinated practically all of the university's students.

In September 1917, after Wesleyan's head football coach entered the military during World War I, Fauver took over as the head football coach for the 1917 season. He also served as the university's head football coach in 1921. He compiled a 4–6–5 in his two seasons as head football coach.

At the annual meeting of the NCAA in December 1921, Fauver spoke in opposition to the menace of "big money" in college sports. Fauver predicted the scrapping of college athletics unless "the commercial evil" was not overcome. He pointed out that the lure of immense gate receipts and the need to maintain an elaborate athletic system would result in attempts to get winning teams at any price and by any means.

In 1937, Fauver retired as Wesleyan's athletic director to devote himself to his duties as Wesleyan's college physician.

== Family and later years ==
In 1908, Fauver married Alice C. McDaniels.

Fauver died in April 1946 at the Wesleyan University infirmary at age 70.

In 1959, Wesleyan dedicated its athletic field as Fauver Field in honor of Fauver's long years of service to the institution. When two undergraduate residence complexes were built on the site of Fauver Field in 2005, the buildings were named the Fauver Residences.

== Head coaching record ==
=== Football ===
Year	Team	Overall	Conference	Standing	Bowl/playoffs
Centre (Independent) (1899)
1899	Centre	5–2–1			
Centre:		5–2–1			
Oberlin Yeomen (Independent) (1900–1901)
1900	Oberlin	5–3			
1901	Oberlin	7–2			
Oberlin Yeomen (Ohio Athletic Conference) (1902)
1902	Oberlin	4–4	1–2	4th	
Oberlin:		16–9	1–2		
Wesleyan Methodists (Independent) (1917)
1917	Wesleyan	3–2–2			
Wesleyan Methodists (Independent) (1921)
1921	Wesleyan	1–4–3			
Wesleyan:		4–6–5			
Total:		27–17–6			
