= Edward Fauver =

American football coach and administrator (1875–1949)

Biographical details
- Born: May 7, 1875; North Eaton, Ohio, U.S.
- Died: December 17, 1949 (aged 74); Sarasota, Florida, U.S.

Playing career
- 1898: Oberlin

Coaching career (HC unless noted)
- 1899: Alma
- 1900–1904: Oberlin
- 1917–1918: Rochester (NY)

Administrative career (AD unless noted)
- 1917–1939: Rochester (NY)

Head coaching record
- Overall: 30–21–6

Edward "Edwin" Fauver (May 7, 1875 – December 17, 1949) was an American football coach and college athletics administrator. In addition to his coaching duties, he was an athletic instructor at Columbia University and Wesleyan University.

== Coaching career ==
=== Alma ===
Fauver was the head football coach at Alma College in Alma, Michigan for one season, in 1899, compiling a record of 2–1–3.

=== Oberlin ===
After his year at Alma, Fauvner became the head coach at Oberlin College in Oberlin, Ohio for five seasons, from 1900 to 1904, three of those seasons alongside his brother Edgar Fauver. At Oberlin, his teams generated a record of 24–15–2.

=== Rochester ===
Fauver went on to become the head football coach and athletic director at the University of Rochester in Rochester, New York. He was the head football coach for the 1917 and 1918 seasons and achieved a record of 4–5–1. He was Rochester's baseball coach from 1918 to 1928 and compiled a 27-59-1 record. While at Rochester, he helped to form the New York State Conference of Small Colleges and the Western New York Intercollegiate Athletic Conference. On October 18, 1930, the school chose to honor him by naming the university's stadium in his honor. He served as the university's athletic director until 1939 and chairman of the department of physical education until 1945.

== Head coaching record ==
Year	Team	Overall	Conference	Standing	Bowl/playoffs
Alma Maroon and Cream (Independent) (1899)
1899	Alma	2–1–3			
Alma:		2–1–3			
Oberlin Yeomen (Independent) (1900–1901)
1900	Oberlin	5–3			
1901	Oberlin	7–2			
Oberlin Yeomen (Ohio Athletic Conference) (1902–1904)
1902	Oberlin	4–4	1–2	4th	
1903	Oberlin	4–4–1	2–2–1	3rd	
1904	Oberlin	4–2–1	2–1–1	T–3rd	
Oberlin:		24–15–2	5–5–2		
Rochester (Independent) (1917–1918)
1917	Rochester	1–4–1			
1918	Rochester	3–1			
Rochester:		4–5–1			
Total:		30–21–6			
