= Wilbur Cahoon House =

Historic house in Ohio, United States

- U.S. National Register of Historic Places
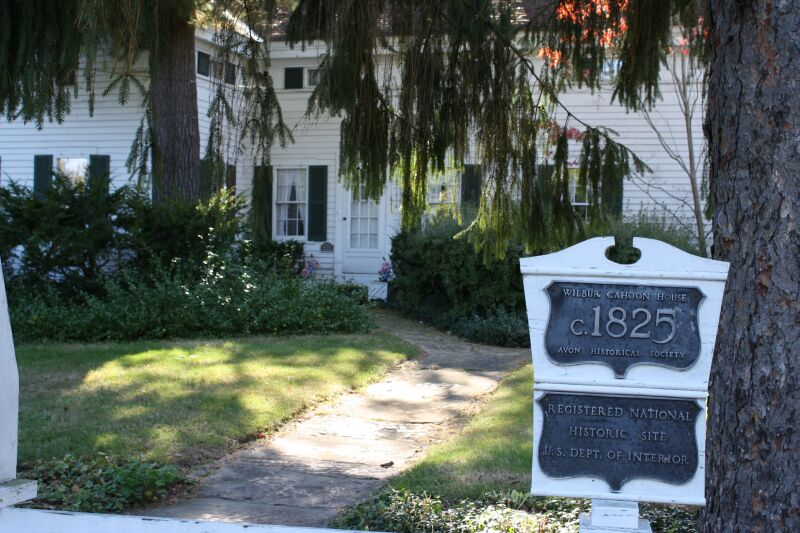
- Roadside view of the house

- Location within Ohio Location within the United States
- Location: 2940 Stoney Ridge Rd., Avon, Ohio
- Coordinates: 41°26′50″N 82°1′58″W
- Area: 1 acre (0.40 ha)
- Built: 1826
- Architect: Wilbur Cahoon
- Architectural style: Greek Revival
- NRHP reference No.: 78002104
- Added to NRHP: April 6, 1978

The Wilbur Cahoon House is one of the oldest homes in Lorain County, Ohio, United States. The house is 80 feet (24 m) long with 12 rooms, situated overlooking French Creek. Wilbur Cahoon arrived in Avon in 1814 from Herkimer County, New York with his wife, Priscilla and family; he was Avon's first settler and an early industrialist. Cahoon purchased 800 acres (320 ha) through a trade of 100 acres (40 ha) in New York. His new land was covered by a forest, and he and his family constructed a log cabin as a temporary shelter. In the following year, he began to build a sawmill nearby along French Creek, and in 1818 established a gristmill. The log cabin was no longer the Cahoon family home after 1826, when the present house was erected. Later in life, Cahoon entered into local public service: he served as Justice of the Peace for Avon, Sheffield and Dover Townships, as well as holding offices such as overseer of the poor, elections judge, and constable.

Cahoon's house is a Greek Revival building with prominent local vernacular influences. Although the style is typical of period houses in the region, its floor plan is unusually disorderly, in contrast to the symmetry of typical Greek Revival structures, and the house is unusually short for its footprint. Set on a stone foundation, the house is a two-story wooden structure with a protruding gabled section on the left, as seen from the road. Shuttered windows fill much of the wall space on the facade.

In 1978, the Cahoon House was listed on the National Register of Historic Places, qualifying because of its connection to Cahoon. As the home of the first pioneer in the area and as one of the area's earliest buildings in any architectural style, it occupies a significant place in local history.
