= Oberlin Academy =

Oberlin Academy Preparatory School

Location
- Oberlin, Ohio; United States
- Coordinates: 41°17′35″N 82°13′07″W

Information
- Other names: Oberlin Institute, Preparatory Department of Oberlin College, Oberlin Academy
- School type: College preparatory
- Established: 1833
- Closed: 1916

Oberlin Academy Preparatory School, originally the Preparatory Department of Oberlin College, was a private preparatory school in Oberlin, Ohio which operated from 1833 until 1916. The College opened the preparatory department in 1833 as a part of the Oberlin Collegiate Institute, which became Oberlin College in 1850. The secondary school serving local and boarding students continued as a department of the college. The school and college admitted African Americans and women. This was very unusual and controversial. It was located on the Oberlin College campus for much of its history and many of its students continued on to study at Oberlin College. Various alumni and staff went on to notable careers.

== History ==
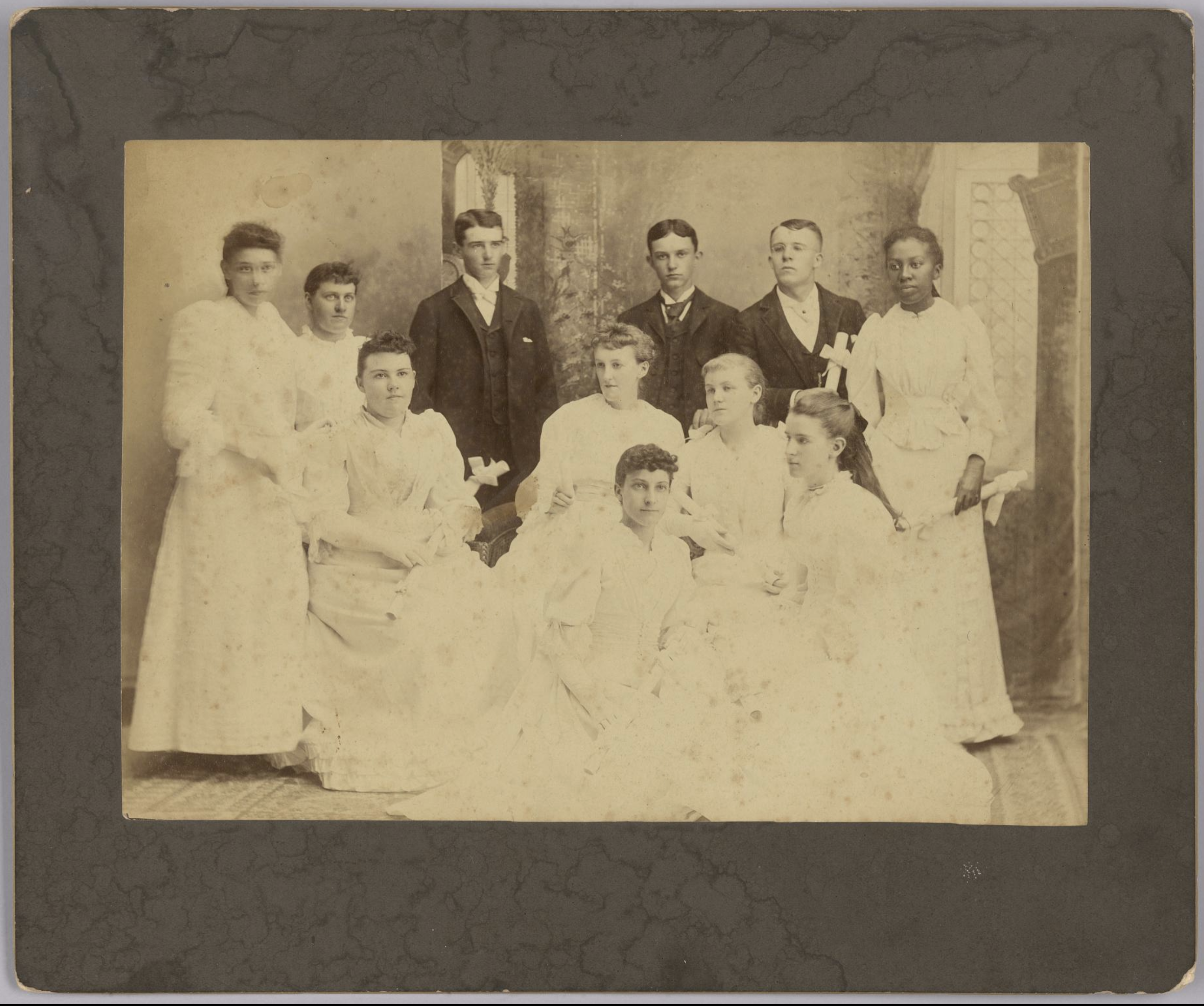
Class of 1892

The Preparatory Department of Oberlin College, a private secondary school, was established in 1832 or 1833, (Note: Most sources list 1833 as the establishment date. However, an item in the January 1910 Oberlin Alumni Magazine (third, unnumbered, page after title page) signed by John Fisher Peck, Principal, states that the school was founded in 1832.) 27 years before the city of Oberlin, Ohio, established their public high school. Public high schools were uncommon at the time; as a result, many colleges found that their incoming students were poorly prepared for academic studies. This led some colleges to establish their own high schools, organized as preparatory departments of the college.

The Preparatory Department faced opposition from conservative Whites in Ohio who opposed its admittance of African Americans. The undergraduate education program continued afterwards as a preparatory school sometimes referred to as "prep".

The Preparatory Department was the only primary education in Oberlin until the community organized a school district and eventually launched public schools. The Preparatory Department had an enrollment of 690 students in 1890.

Sarah Watson, the first African American woman to attend Oberlin, enrolled in the Preparatory Department in 1842. Between 1833 and 1865, at least 140 black women studied at Oberlin, most of them in the Preparatory Department.

In 1887, the school moved into French Hall and part of Society Hall. From 1892 the secondary school was called Oberlin Academy. The school's mission was to prepare students for college.

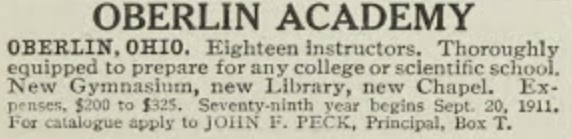
Classified ad for Oberlin Academy from the Saturday Evening Post, July 29, 1911

Edward Henry Fairchild was the school's principal from 1853 until 1869. An abolitionist, he went on to become president of Berea College, a coeducational and integrated institution in Kentucky. John Fisher Peck also served as the school's principal. His daughter, Emily Peck, tutored Latin and Greek at the preparatory department and was an artist who depicted fellow Oberlin alums in sculpture.

Booker T. Washington, who had close ties to Oberlin College and hired teachers from the school at Tuskegee Institute, sent his son Ernst to Oberlin Academy in 1904 and 1905.

By 1905, the school's enrollment was declining. One of the factors for the decline was that public high schools were becoming widely available by that time. In January 1910, the Oberlin Alumni Magazine published an entry on the school, its significance, and the need for continued support of it. In 1912 a new building opened for the academy and the Oberlin Academy Alumni Association was organized.

The school was removed from campus from 1912 to 1916 and occupied the Johnson mansion (now known as Johnson House) on South Professor Street in Oberlin. The Johnson House is now the Hebrew Heritage House, a college residence for Jewish students.

In 1915, the college announced that it would close the Preparatory Academy. In that same year, the academy was listed in A Handbook of the Best Private Schools of the United States and Canada, which stated:

It is a co-educational school with an attendance of over three hundred, largely from the region round about, but in all representing thirty states. For many years during its history the teachers of the Academy were students at the College who thus earned their support. The Academy has however for many years had its own independent faculty and developed a life of its own.

== Alumni ==
Alumni include:

- Calvin Brainerd Cady, musician, educator, and writer
- Jacob Dolson Cox, Union Army general, politician, and microbiologist
- John Dube, founder of the South African Native National Congress
- Richard Theodore Greener, Harvard College graduate and dean of Howard University School of Law
- James Monroe Gregory
- Luther Gulick (physician)
- Charles Robert Hager
- Forrest M. Hall
- William W. Hannan
- Ellen Hayes
- Robert Maynard Hutchins
- John Mercer Langston, first African American congressman from Virginia
- Edmonia Lewis
- Sinclair Lewis
- George Herbert Mead
- Byron R. Newton, journalist who attended from 1862 to 1864
- Benjamin F. Randolph
- Josiah T. Settle
- Henry H. Straight
- Joshua McCarter Simpson, poet and lyricist who lived in Zanesville and wrote abolitionist songs
- Eloise Bibb Thompson
- Katharine Wright

== Faculty ==
Teachers included:

- Sarah Cowles Little
- Edgar Fauver
- Fanny Jackson Coppin, the "first black teacher in the preparatory department."
