= Immaculate Conception Church (Grafton, Ohio) =

Historic church in Ohio, United States

- U.S. National Register of Historic Places
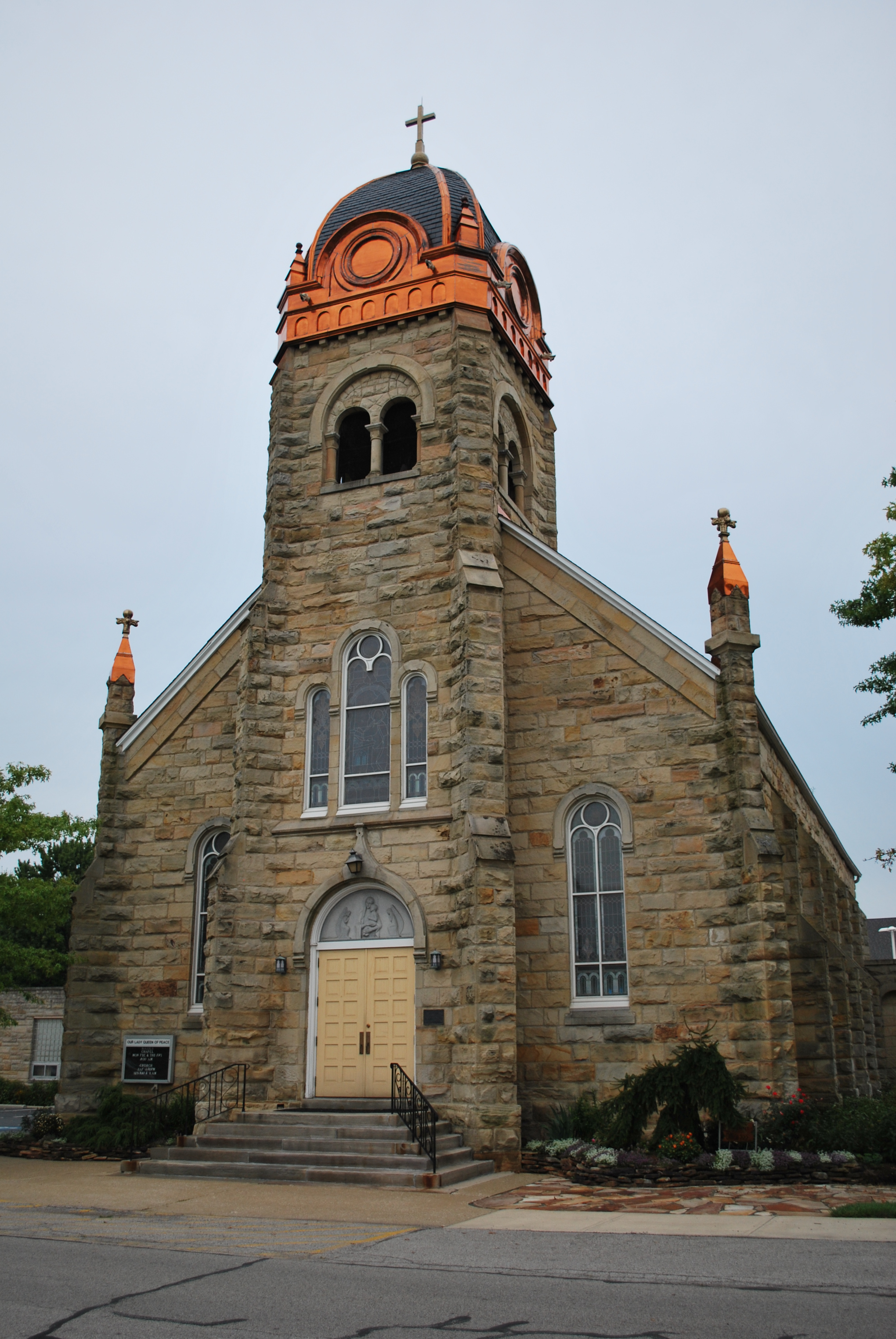

- Location within Ohio Location within the United States
- Location: 708 Erie St., Grafton, Ohio
- Coordinates: 41°16′37″N 82°3′36″W
- Area: less than one acre
- Built: 1864
- Architectural style: Romanesque
- NRHP reference No.: 76001469
- Added to NRHP: March 16, 1976

Immaculate Conception Church is a historic Roman Catholic church at 708 Erie Street in Grafton, Ohio.

It was built in 1864 and added to the National Register of Historic Places in 1976.
