= North Ridgeville High School =

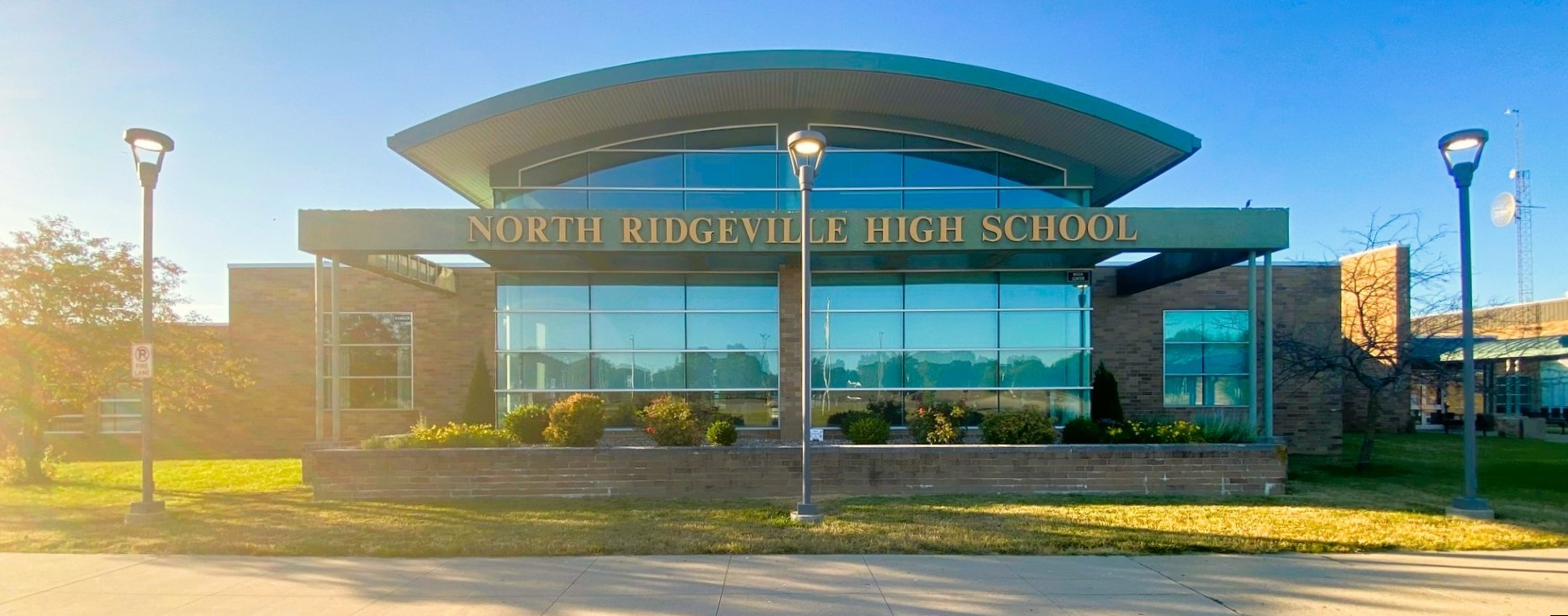

Location
- 34600 Bainbridge Road; North Ridgeville, Ohio 44039; United States; 41°23′18″N 82°0′5″W

Information
- Type: Public, Coeducational
- School district: North Ridgeville City School District
- Principal: Meghan Hignite
- Teaching staff: 61.75 (FTE)
- Grades: 9–12
- Student to teacher ratio: 20.45
- Colors: Blue and Gold
- Athletics conference: Southwestern Conference
- Team name: Rangers
- Rival: Midview High School
- Website: nrhs.nrcs.net

North Ridgeville High School is a public high school located in North Ridgeville, Ohio, United States. It is the only high school in the North Ridgeville City School District. The school colors are navy blue and gold and athletic teams are known as the Rangers. The school is a member of the Southwestern Conference. North Ridgeville's traditional archrival is Midview.

== Building history ==
The present high school building was constructed in 1967, with three later additions. A comprehensive high school, North Ridgeville houses grades 9, 10, 11, and 12, with an enrollment of approximately 1200 students.

== Notable alumni ==
- Anthony Mayweather (2003), professional wrestler
- Jordan White (2006), former NFL player
- Isabella Geraci (2018), United States National Team flag football player

== Faculty ==
The faculty consists of 80 members. Over 56% have a master's degree or graduate work beyond a master's degree.

== Parental involvement ==
The Ranger Parent Club is an organization open to all parents of NRHS students. This group encourages and promotes parental involvement and open communication between the home and school. Some of its activities include publishing a newsletter, providing chaperones for school activities, coat check at dances and sponsoring of the After-Prom activities.

The Academic Recognition Committee is a group of parents and faculty members dedicated to promoting academic achievement at all ability levels. Some of its activities include sending letters to commend academic accomplishments, the ARC showcase, the Academic Awards Banquet, “Hall of Fame”, and providing scholarships to selected Seniors.

== Curriculum ==
Approximately 125 courses are offered in the areas of Art, Business, English, Family and Consumer Science, Foreign Language, Health/Physical Education, Industrial Technology, Math, Music, Science, Social Studies, Special Education, and Vocational. Honors credit is granted in most accelerated courses. Also available to students are Accelerated Pre-Calculus, in which students completing the course will receive LCCC credit, Accelerated US History, Biology Seminar, and Spanish Four will receive Kenyon College credit. Advanced Placement Art History, Government, AP Senior English, and US History are also offered. North Ridgeville High School has units for Disability Handicapped students and are actively involved in Inclusion. North Ridgeville High School also offers six vocational programs including Career Based Intervention 9, 10, and Marketing Education 11 & 12.

Juniors and Seniors may elect to attend the Lorain County Joint Vocational School that offers over thirty vocational programs. These students are bused to LCJVS for their vocational and academic course work. Juniors and Seniors that meet the requirements can enroll in area colleges as a post-secondary option student. The high school's choral and instrumental programs receive consistently high ratings in state and local competitions.

== Extracurricular activities ==
North Ridgeville High School has eighteen varsity sports involving approximately 150+ students per season. In addition, most sports have a junior varsity and freshmen team.

The school also sponsors many clubs and activities that encourage student involvement, leadership training, and community service.
