= Luke S. Johnson (politician) =

American politician (1847–1910)

Member of the Michigan House of Representatives from the Huron County district
- In office January 1, 1891 – January 1, 1893
- Preceded by: August Heinemann
- Succeeded by: John Sparling

Personal details
- Born: December 30, 1847; Avon, Ohio
- Died: December 17, 1910 (aged 62) Caseville, Michigan
- Party: Democratic
- Other political affiliations: People's Party (1898, fusion)
- Spouse: Clara Chase (m. 1867)

Military service
- Allegiance: United States Army
- Battles/wars: American Civil War: Battle of Decatur; Battle of Resaca; Battle of Dallas; Battle of Kennesaw Mountain; Battle of Peachtree Creek

Luke S. Johnson (December 30, 1847 – December 17, 1910) was an American soldier and politician.

== Early life ==
Luke S. Johnson was born on December 30, 1847, in Avon, Ohio, to parents Thomas and Nancy Johnson. Luke was raised on a farm until age 15, when he enlisted in the Union Army.

== Military career ==
Johnson enlisted in the Union Army at age 15. He was initially enrolled in Company H of the 43rd Ohio Infantry Regiment. The regiment was assigned the command of the XVI Corps in the Fourth Division, but in the spring of 1864, Johnson was transferred to the First Division of the XVII Corps. There, he served under General John W. Sprague. On May 1, 1864, Johnson's regiment joined General William Tecumseh Sherman's army at Chattanooga. The first battle Johnson participated in which he was under fire was the Battle of Decatur. Johnson received a minor leg wound, above the left knee joint, at the Battle of Resaca. Johnson still participated in future battles, such as the Battle of Dallas, the Battle of Kennesaw Mountain, and the Battle of Peachtree Creek. After the fall of Atlanta, Johnson served as an orderly for General Sprague, a position he served in until he was discharged at the end of the war. After the war, Johnson moved back to Lorain County, Ohio.

== Career ==
In 1869, Johnson moved with his family to Saginaw, Michigan. There, he worked for five years as an engineer in mills for G. F. Williams & Bros. In March 1874, Johnson moved to Caseville, Michigan, where he started work as log scaler and a shipper of lumber and salt. By 1884, Johnson had served two years as deputy sheriff, and three terms as township clerk, and had filed for another term.

On November 7, 1890, Johnson was elected to the Michigan House of Representatives, where he represented the Huron County district. He was sworn in on January 7, 1891. In the legislature, Johnson sought to amend an 1889 law. Johnson's amendment sought to make a county relief fund for indigent soldiers and sailors, as opposed to a township fund. The bill passed the state house on June 24, 1891. Johnson's term expired on January 1, 1893. In 1898, Johnson ran again for the Huron County seat in the state house on a fusion ticket called the Democratic People's Union Silver, but was defeated by Republican John J. Murdoch. Johnson ran for the seat again in 1906, where he was defeated again by Republican Leonard R. Thomas.

Johnson served for years as chairman of the Huron County Democratic Committee. By August 1910, Johnson resigned as chairman due to ill health.

== Personal life ==
On February 18, 1867, Johnson married Clara Case. Together, they had six children. Johnson was a Freemason.

== Death ==
Johnson died on December 17, 1910, in Caseville. On December 20, 1910, Johnson was interred at Caseville Cemetery. He was survived by his wife and all six of his children.
