= Avon High School (Ohio) =

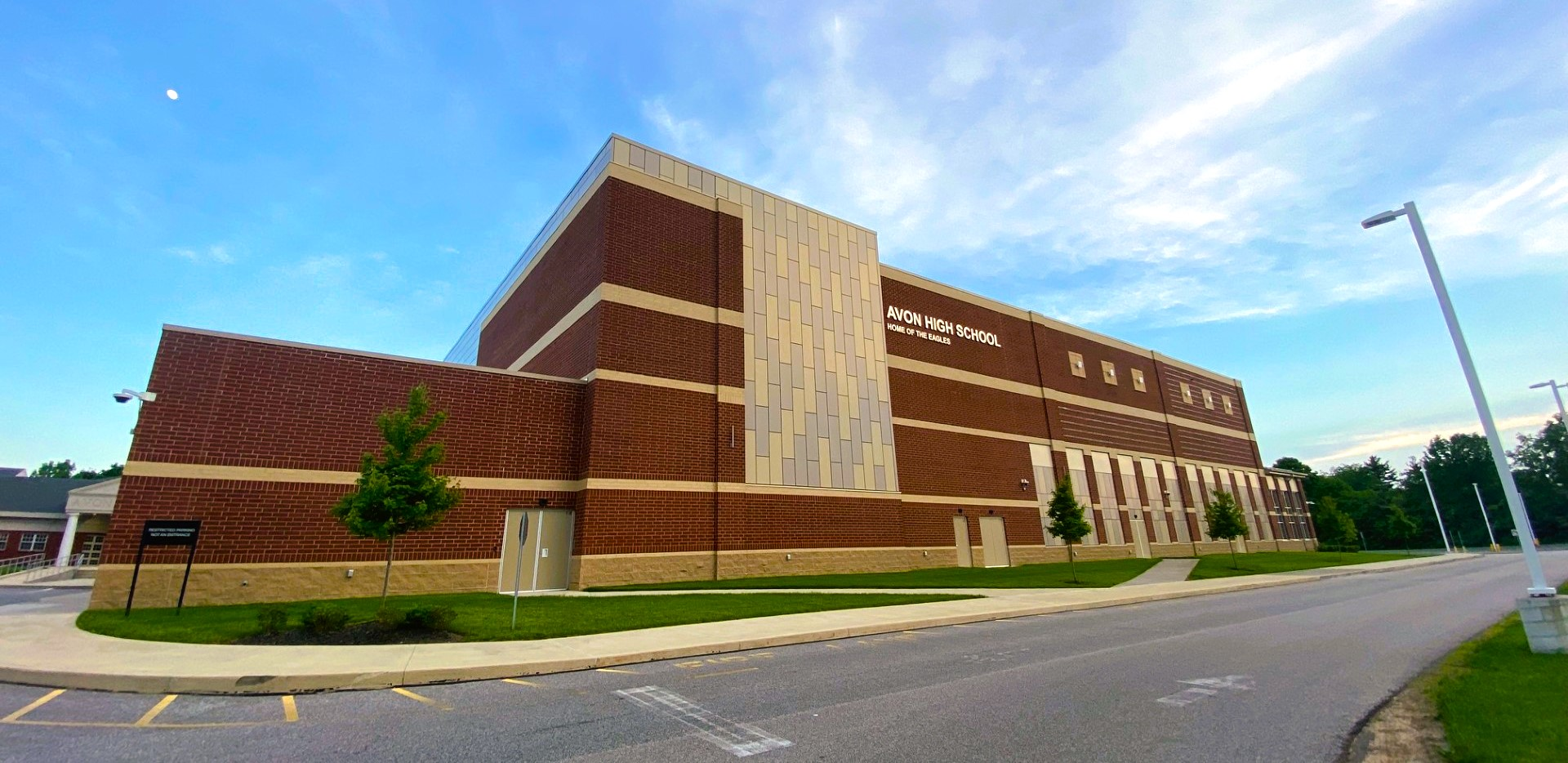

Location
- 37545 Detroit Road; Avon, Ohio 44011; United States; 41°26′41″N 82°2′16″W

Information
- Type: Public, coeducational
- Founder: Owen Robert McDougald III
- School district: Avon Local School District
- Principal: Kristina Dobos Buller
- Teaching staff: 69.61 (on an FTE basis)
- Grades: 9–12
- Enrollment: 1,428 (2023-2024)
- Student to teacher ratio: 20.51
- Campus type: Suburban
- Colors: Purple and gold
- Athletics conference: Southwestern Conference
- Team name: Eagles
- Rival: Avon Lake High School
- Website: avonlocalschools.org/buildings/high_school_9-12

Avon High School is a public high school for grades 9–12 located in Avon, Ohio, United States. Athletic teams are known as the Eagles and play in the Southwestern Conference as of the 2018–2019 school year. The current Avon High School opened in 1998, located on 37 acres of land on Detroit Road. The school is two stories tall and was built for 800 students with room to expand it for 1,600 students.

== Sports ==
Avon is currently a member of the Southwestern Conference, as of 2015.

====== State championships ======
- Boys soccer - 2025, 2026
- Football - 2024, 2025
- Girls track and field - 2026
- Girls volleyball - 2025

== Other extracurricular activities ==
In 2018, the schools band placed first at the Maumee Music in Motion competition. They won 4 awards which consisted of Grand Champion, Best Music, Best General Effect, and Best Percussion. There were 110 band members that participated in winning these awards.

== Academics ==
In 2018, Avon high school had a graduation rate of 98%. Avon scored 79% in mathematics proficiency, while receiving a score of 83% in reading proficiency. Out of the 1,193 kids that went to Avon high school in 2018, 39% of the students participate in AP classes. When it came to testing 75% of the students passed their exams.

== Notable alumni ==
- Ross Douglas, college football coach and former player
