= North Ridgeville, Ohio =

- City
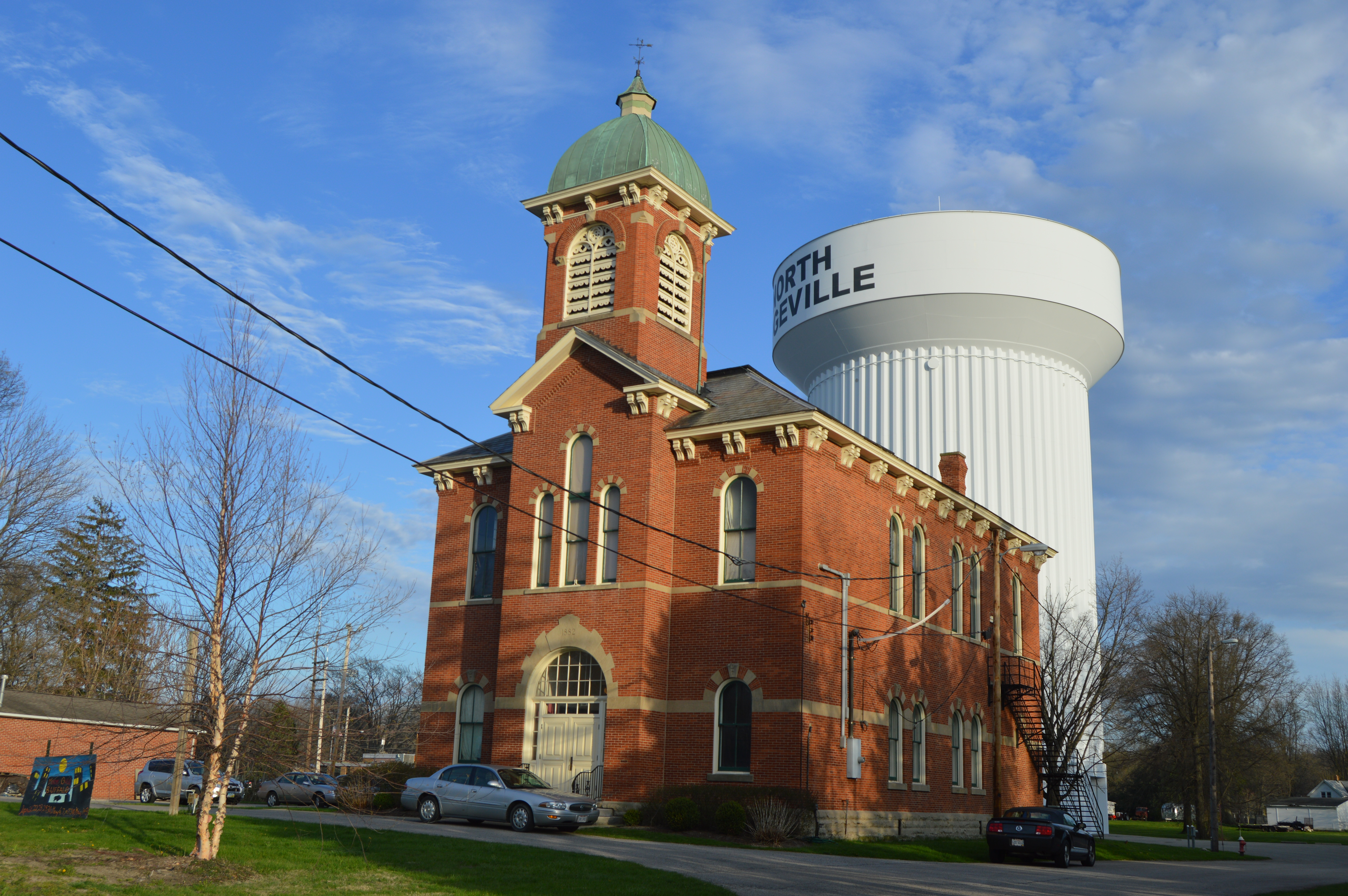
- Former city hall on Center Ridge Road
- Interactive map of North Ridgeville, Ohio
- Location within Ohio Location within the United States
- Coordinates: 41°23′06″N 82°01′10″W
- Country: United States
- State: Ohio
- County: Lorain

Area
  - Total: 23.60 sq mi (61.12 km^{2})
  - Land: 23.44 sq mi (60.72 km^{2})
  - Water: 0.15 sq mi (0.40 km^{2})
- Elevation: 725 ft (221 m)

Population (2020)
  - Total: 35,280
  - Density: 1,505.0/sq mi (581.07/km^{2})
- Time zone: UTC-5 (Eastern (EST))
  - Summer (DST): UTC-4 (EDT)
- ZIP codes: 44039
- Area code: 440
- FIPS code: 39-56966
- GNIS feature ID: 1086515
- Website: www.nridgeville.org

North Ridgeville is a city located along the eastern border of Lorain County, Ohio, United States. The city's population was 35,280 as of the 2020 census. A part of the Cleveland metropolitan area, North Ridgeville is the fastest-growing city in northern Ohio. It has been ranked the 13th safest city in the United States and the safest in Ohio.

Located 8 miles (13 km) from Cleveland Hopkins International Airport, and 18 miles (29 km) west of downtown Cleveland, North Ridgeville is the third-largest city in Lorain County and the 37th most populous city in Ohio. North Ridgeville is home to a 350,000 square foot Riddell Sports Group production and distribution center, where National Football League and NCAA helmets and pads are produced. It is also home to a campus of Lorain County Community College and a branch of University Hospitals Cleveland Medical Center.

== History ==
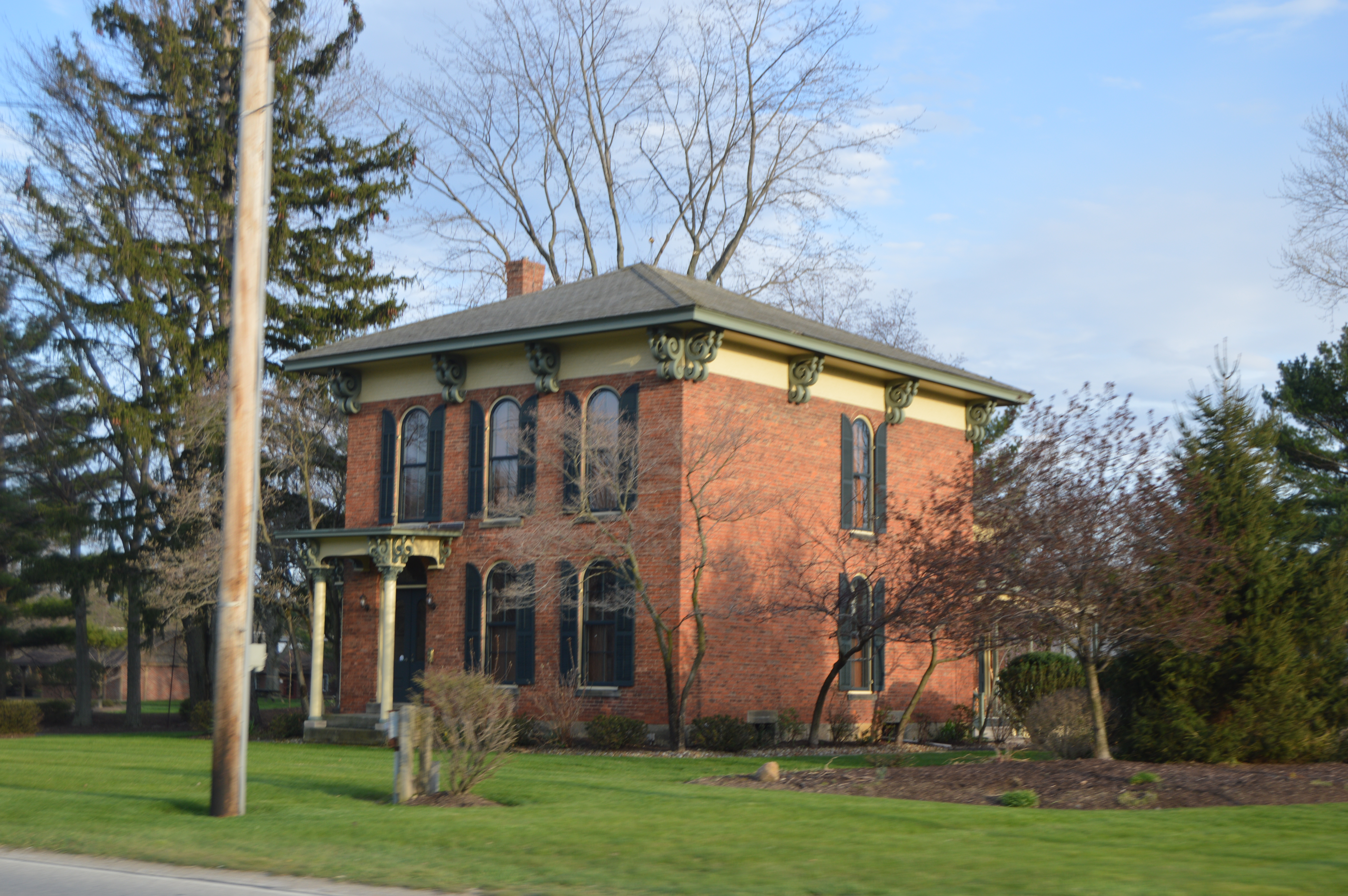
Samuel C. Cahoon House, built in 1850

The first settlement of what is now North Ridgeville was made in 1810. The village was named for a ridge near the original town site.

The former North Ridgeville Town Hall and Samuel C. Cahoon House are listed on the National Register of Historic Places.

== Geography ==
According to the United States Census Bureau, the city has an area of 23.58 square miles (61.07 km^{2}), of which 23.44 square miles (60.71 km^{2}) is land and 0.14 square miles (0.36 km^{2}) is water.

The city of North Ridgeville has a post office, with the zip code of 44039. This zip code covers most of the city. Some sections of the city use zip codes 44035, 44011 and 44044..

Located in eastern Lorain County, it borders the following municipalities and townships:

- Avon, Lorain County - north
- Westlake, Cuyahoga County - northeast
- North Olmsted, Cuyahoga County - east
- Olmsted Township, Cuyahoga County - southeast
- Columbia Township, Lorain County - southeast corner
- Eaton Township, Lorain County - south
- Elyria, Lorain County - west
- Sheffield, Lorain County - northwest corner

== Demographics ==
Historical population
Census	Pop.	Note	%±
1960	8,057		—
1970	13,152		63.2%
1980	21,237		61.5%
1990	21,564		1.5%
2000	22,338		3.6%
2010	29,465		31.9%
2020	35,280		19.7%
2025 (est.)	37,786		7.1%

=== 2020 census ===
As of the 2020 census, North Ridgeville had a population of 35,280. The median age was 43.7 years, 21.5% of residents were under the age of 18, and 21.4% were 65 years of age or older. For every 100 females there were 96.4 males, and for every 100 females age 18 and over there were 93.3 males age 18 and over.

99.8% of residents lived in urban areas, while 0.2% lived in rural areas.

There were 14,148 households in North Ridgeville, of which 28.8% had children under the age of 18 living in them. Of all households, 57.9% were married-couple households, 13.9% were households with a male householder and no spouse or partner present, and 22.0% were households with a female householder and no spouse or partner present. About 24.2% of all households were made up of individuals and 12.6% had someone living alone who was 65 years of age or older.

There were 14,716 housing units, of which 3.9% were vacant. The homeowner vacancy rate was 1.1% and the rental vacancy rate was 6.0%.

Racial composition as of the 2020 census
Race	Number	Percent
White	31,494	89.3%
Black or African American	662	1.9%
American Indian and Alaska Native	62	0.2%
Asian	567	1.6%
Native Hawaiian and Other Pacific Islander	10	0.0%
Some other race	419	1.2%
Two or more races	2,066	5.9%
Hispanic or Latino (of any race)	1,614	4.6%

=== 2010 census ===
As of the census of 2010, there were 29,465 people, 11,500 households, and 8,486 families residing in the city. The population density was 1,257.0 inhabitants per square mile (485.3/km^{2}). There were 12,109 housing units at an average density of 516.6 units per square mile (199.5 units/km^{2}). The racial makeup of the city was 95.0% White, 1.5% African American, 0.2% Native American, 1.2% Asian, 0.6% from other races, and 1.6% from two or more races. Hispanic or Latino of any race were 3.3% of the population.

There were 11,500 households, of which 32.1% had children under the age of 18 living with them, 61.3% were married couples living together, 8.6% had a female householder with no husband present, 3.9% had a male householder with no wife present, and 26.2% were non-families. 21.9% of all households were made up of individuals, and 8.4% had someone living alone who was 65 years of age or older. The average household size was 2.54 and the average family size was 2.97.

The median age in the city was 40.7 years. 23.1% of residents were under the age of 18; 5.9% were between the ages of 18 and 24; 27.1% were from 25 to 44; 28.9% were from 45 to 64; and 15% were 65 years of age or older. The gender makeup of the city was 49.1% male and 50.9% female.

=== 2000 census ===
As of the census of 2000, there were 22,338 people, 8,356 households, and 6,434 families residing in the city. The population density was 369.1 people/km^{2} (956 people/mi^{2}). There were 8,587 housing units at an average density of 141.9 units/km^{2} (368 units/mi^{2}). The racial makeup of the city was 96.36% White, 0.86% African American, 0.21% Native American, 0.92% Asian, 0.49% from other races, and 1.15% from two or more races. Hispanic or Latino of any race were 1.99% of the population.

There were 8,356 households, out of which 32.9% had children under the age of 18 living with them, 65.1% were married couples living together, 8.5% had a female householder with no husband present, and 23.0% were non-families. 19.4% of all households were made up of individuals, and 6.5% had someone living alone who was 65 years of age or older. The average household size was 2.65 and the average family size was 3.05.

In the city the population was spread out, with 24.4% under the age of 18, 7.0% from 18 to 24, 30.6% from 25 to 44, 27.3% from 45 to 64, and 10.7% who were 65 years of age or older. The median age was 38 years. For every 100 females, there were 96.4 males. For every 100 females age 18 and over, there were 93.6 males.

The median income for a household in the city was $54,482, and the median income for a family was $61,621. Males had a median income of $42,634 versus $27,379 for females. The per capita income for the city was $22,971. About 2.3% of families and 3.2% of the population were below the poverty line, including 4.2% of those under age 18 and 5.0% of those age 65 or over.

== Arts and culture ==
North Ridgeville is home to the North Ridgeville Corn Festival. The history started when the Bicentennial Committee for the City of North Ridgeville was formed in 1975 to celebrate the upcoming United States bicentennial in 1976. The first festival ran six hours and featured 13 booths around the North Ridgeville Middle School track. The proceeds were donated to the library to assist with the cost of relocating it from the old Lawson's store area the Olde Town Hall building across the street. The next year, in 1976, in addition to celebrating the bicentennial, the festival was held in honor Harold Sweet, a sweet corn grower in North Ridgeville, for all that he did for the youth and citizens of the city. The proceeds from this festival were donated to purchase trees for the then new Bainbridge Extension, along with two bicentennial flags for City Hall. The Bicentennial Committee was renamed the North Ridgeville Corn Festival Committee in 1977.

== Parks and recreation ==
- Sandy Ridge Reservation
- South Central Park
- Frontier Park
- Palmer Field
- Shady Drive Complex
- Soccer Complex
- Victory Park Ohio
- South Central Splash Pad
- Root Road Park
- Ranger stadium

== Education ==
North Ridgeville has a public library, a branch of the Lorain Public Library.

=== Public schools ===
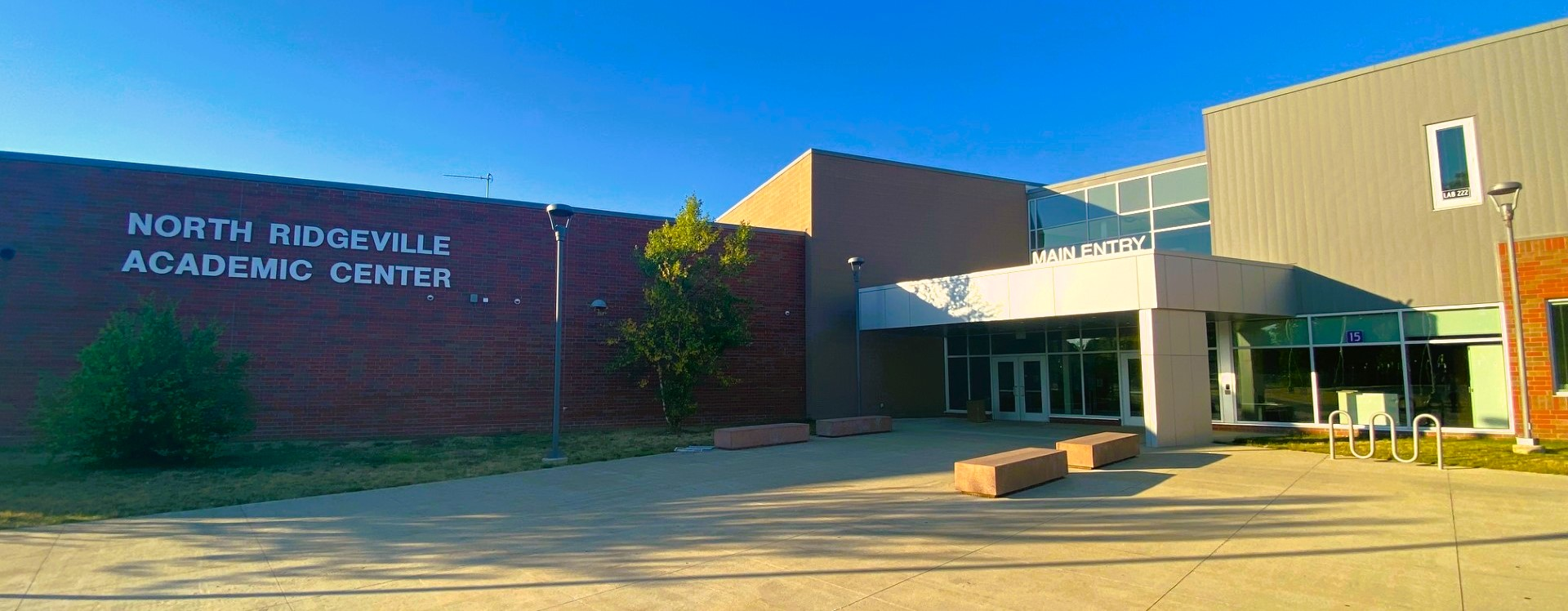
North Ridgeville Academic Center

The North Ridgeville City School District is managed by a directly elected school board. The district was given a mediocre report card by the Ohio Department of Education for the years 2015–16. It had a grade of F for "Gap Closing" as well as "K-3 Literacy", while receiving a B for "Graduation Rate".

Public primary and intermediate schools include:

- Early Childhood Learning Community, on Mills Creek Ln. (Pre-K thru K)
- Liberty Elementary School, on Jaycox Rd. (1–2)
- North Ridgeville Academic Center, on Bainbridge Rd. (3–8)

There is also the Ranger High Tech Academy for STEM students grades 2 through 8.

Public high schools include:

- North Ridgeville High School (NRHS), on Bainbridge Road and Pitts Boulevard.
- Lorain County Joint Vocational School, located in Oberlin, on OH-SR 58 South.

In November 2013, the citizens of North Ridgeville passed a bond issue for the replacement of the North Ridgeville Middle School, Elizabeth Wilcox Elementary, and the Rangers Stadium. The new Rangers Stadium was completed by mid-2016, the inaugural football game took place on September 2, 2016. The North Ridgeville Academic Center, for grades 3–8, and the new stadium has been constructed on the property adjacent to the current North Ridgeville High School, on Bainbridge Road.

=== Private schools ===
Private schools include:

- Saint Peter School, Grades K-8.
- Lake Ridge Academy, Grades K-12.

=== Higher education ===
Lorain County Community College, which is based in nearby Elyria, operates the University Partnership Ridge Campus in eastern North Ridgeville, adjacent to Interstate 480.

== Transportation ==
North Ridgeville is served by many highways, including I-80 (Ohio Turnpike), the Outerbelt South Freeway Interstate 480 (Ohio), U.S. Route 20, Ohio State Route 10, Ohio State Route 83, and Ohio State Route 113.

== Notable people ==
- Joe Charboneau, baseball player for the Cleveland Indians
- Charles O. Hobaugh, astronaut
- Martin Mull, actor and musician
- Dav Pilkey, author of Dog Man and Captain Underpants
- Don Pope, third-place finisher in the 2006 World's Strongest Man competition
