= Marion L. Steele High School =

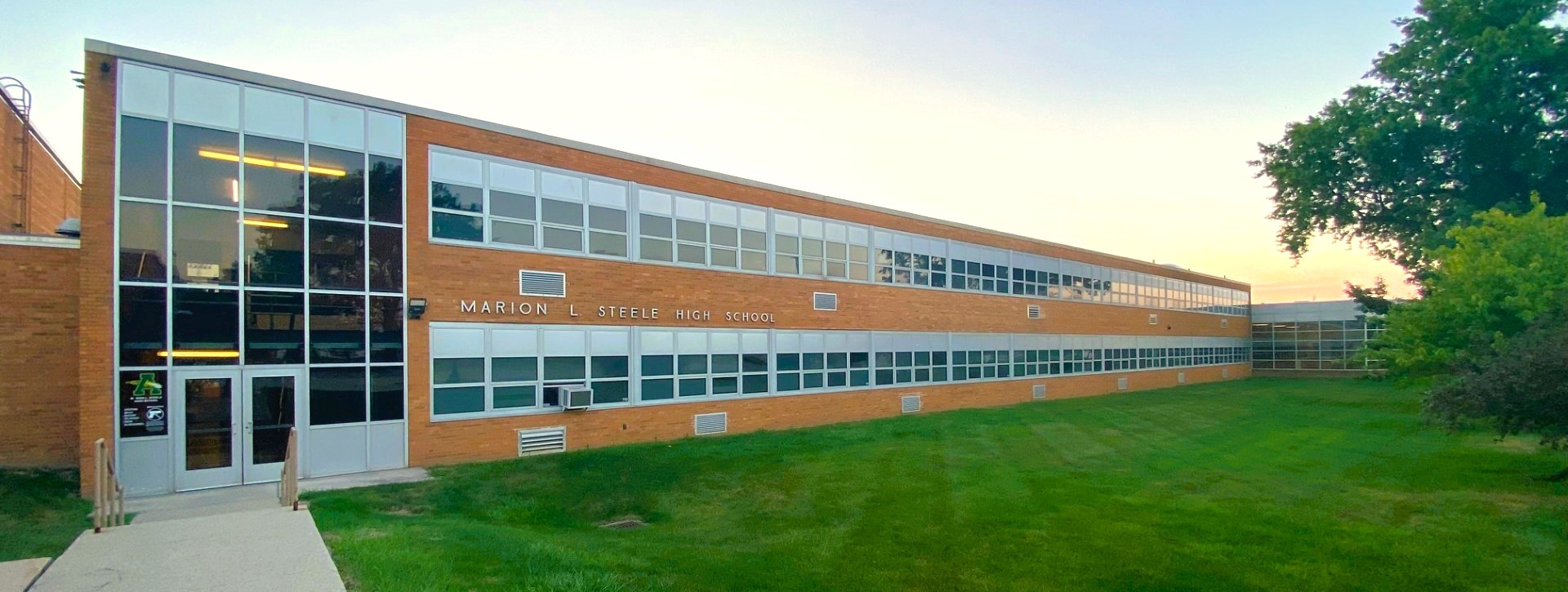

Location
- 450 Washington Street; Amherst, Ohio 44001; United States
- Coordinates: 41°24′16″N 82°13′20″W

Information
- Type: Public, coeducational
- Established: 1958
- Status: Operating
- School district: Amherst Exempted Village School District
- Principal: Joe Tellier
- Teaching staff: 51.50 (FTE)
- Grades: 9–12
- Enrollment: 1,065 (2023-2024)
- Student to teacher ratio: 20.68
- Colors: Kelly green and gold
- Athletics conference: Southwestern Conference
- Mascot: Comet Man
- Nickname: Comets
- Rival: Avon Lake High School
- Website: www.amherstk12.org/o/steele

Marion L. Steele High School, commonly known as Amherst Steele, is a public high school located in Amherst, Ohio, United States, approximately 30 miles (48 km) west of Cleveland. The school is named after Marion L. Steele, a long serving principal.

== Student life ==
The school colors are Kelly green and gold, and the athletic teams are nicknamed the Comets. The school is a member of the Southwestern Conference.

=== State championships ===
- Boys' cross country – 1962, 1977
- Girls' cross country – 1991

== Notable alumni ==
- Phil Parker, football coach for the Iowa Hawkeyes
- Ryan Rua, professional baseball player
