= Eaton Township, Lorain County, Ohio =

Township in Ohio, US

- Township
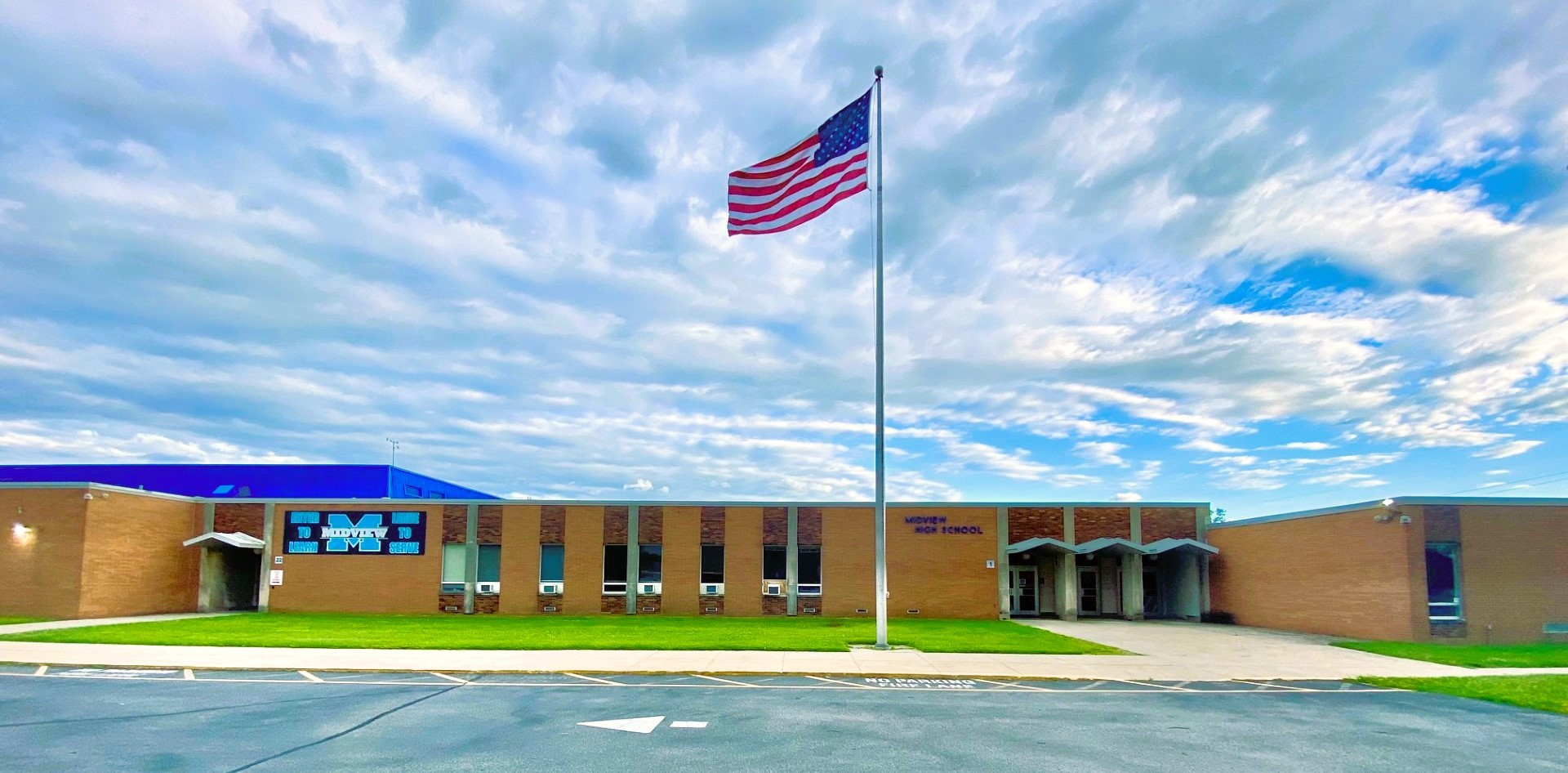
- Midview High School in Eaton Township

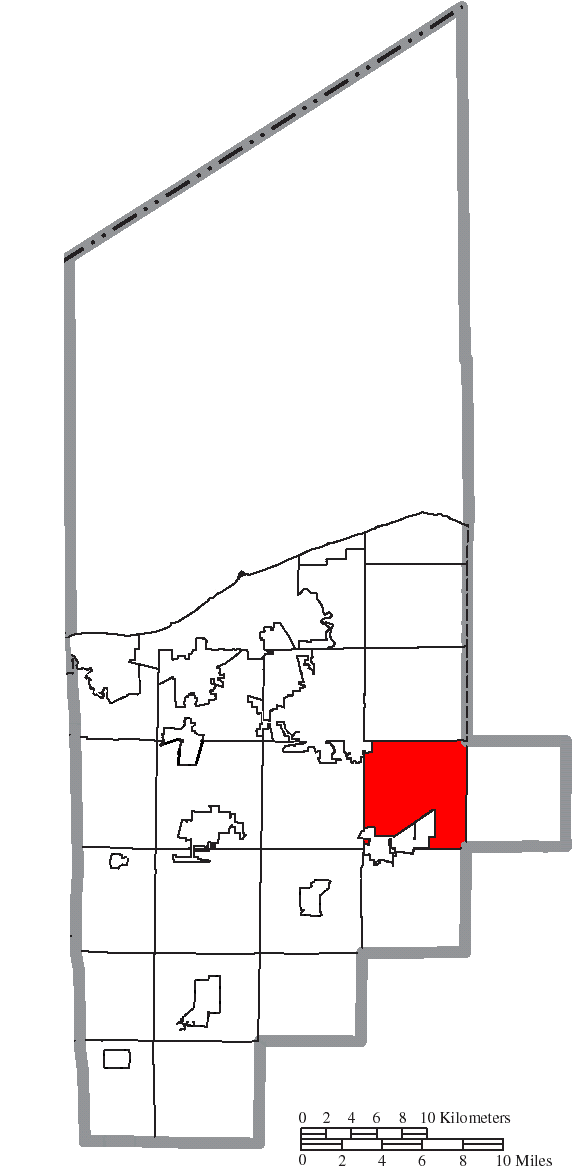
- Location of Eaton Township in Lorain County
- Coordinates: 41°19′13″N 82°1′38″W
- Country: United States
- State: Ohio
- County: Lorain

Area
  - Total: 22.99 sq mi (59.55 km^{2})
  - Land: 22.92 sq mi (59.35 km^{2})
  - Water: 0.077 sq mi (0.20 km^{2})
- Elevation: 791 ft (241 m)

Population (2020)
  - Total: 5,828
  - Density: 254.3/sq mi (98.20/km^{2})
- Time zone: UTC-5 (Eastern (EST))
  - Summer (DST): UTC-4 (EDT)
- FIPS code: 39-24220
- GNIS feature ID: 1086507
- Website: eatontownship.org

Eaton Township is one of the eighteen townships of Lorain County, Ohio, United States. As of the 2020 census, the population was 5,828.

== Geography ==
Located in eastern Lorain County, it borders the following townships and cities:

- North Ridgeville - north
- Olmsted Township, Cuyahoga County - northeast corner
- Columbia Township - east
- Liverpool Township, Medina County - southeast corner
- Grafton Township - southeast
- Grafton - south
- Carlisle Township - west
- Elyria - northwest

Parts of two municipalities, separate from Eaton Township, occupy land that was once part of Eaton Township: a small corner of Elyria in the northwest, and the majority of Grafton in the south. The census-designated place of Eaton Estates lies in the center of the township.

== Name and history ==
It is the only Eaton Township statewide.

== Government ==
The township is governed by a three-member board of trustees, who are elected in November of odd-numbered years to a four-year term beginning on the following January 1. Two are elected in the year after the presidential election and one is elected in the year before it. There is also an elected township fiscal officer, who serves a four-year term beginning on April 1 of the year after the election, which is held in November of the year before the presidential election. Vacancies in the fiscal officership or on the board of trustees are filled by the remaining trustees.
