= Avon, Ohio =

- City
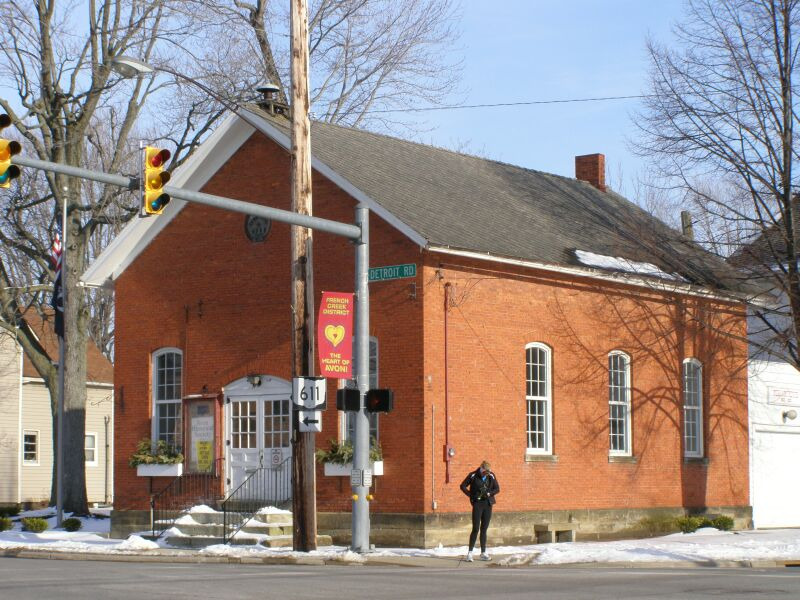
- Original Avon Town Hall at French Creek

- Location of Avon in Greater Cleveland

- Location of Avon, Ohio Avon (the United States) Avon (North America)
- Coordinates: 41°26′55″N 82°00′06″W
- Country: United States
- State: Ohio
- County: Lorain

Area
  - Total: 20.85 sq mi (53.99 km^{2})
  - Land: 20.79 sq mi (53.84 km^{2})
  - Water: 0.058 sq mi (0.15 km^{2})
- Elevation: 689 ft (210 m)

Population (2020)
  - Total: 24,847
  - Estimate (2023): 25,403
  - Density: 1,195/sq mi (461.5/km^{2})
- Time zone: UTC-5 (Eastern (EST))
  - Summer (DST): UTC-4 (EDT)
- ZIP code: 44011
- Area code: 440
- FIPS code: 39-03352
- GNIS feature ID: 1086500
- Website: www.cityofavon.com

Avon (/ˈeɪvɒn/ AY-von) is a city in northeastern Lorain County, Ohio, United States. The population was 24,847 at the 2020 census. It is part of the Cleveland metropolitan area.

== History ==
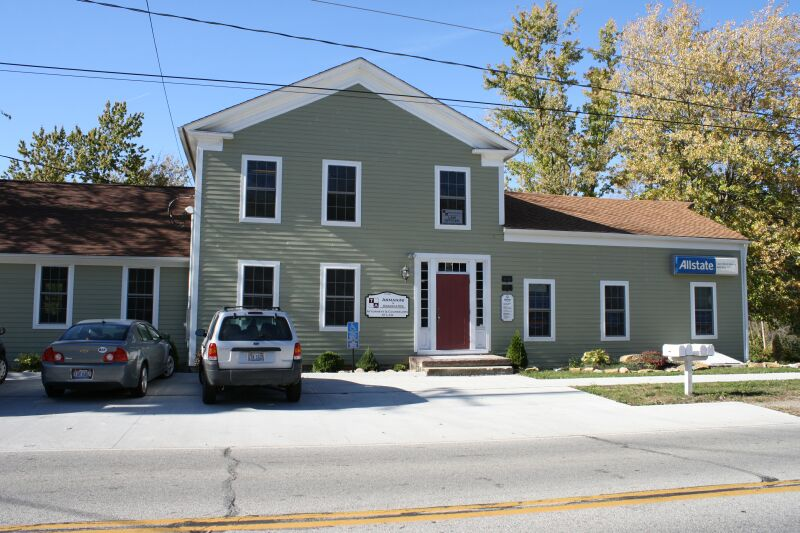
Henry Harrison Williams House

In the 17th century, what is now Avon, Avon Lake, Bay Village, and Westlake were all once one territory. This territory was inhabited by various Native American tribes, such as the Wyandots, Ottawas, and Eries, who lived in wigwams or simple-stone dwellings. They settled, traded, fought, and later forcibly moved elsewhere.

Township Number 7 in Range 16 of the Western Reserve received its first permanent American settlers during 1814 from Montgomery County, New York, led by Wilbur Cahoon. (Note: The Wilbur Cahoon House is listed in the U.S. National Register of Historic Places, reference №: 78002104) The township was administered by Dover township and was part of Cuyahoga County. In 1818, Township Number 7 was organized and named Xeuma, then later renamed Troy Township. In 1824, Lorain County was created, and the name was changed to Avon Township. An Avon post office was established in 1825. The entire township was incorporated into a village in 1917, and it became the City of Avon in 1961.

== Geography ==
According to the United States Census Bureau, the city has a total area of 20.87 square miles (54.05 km^{2}), of which 20.81 square miles (53.90 km^{2}) is land and 0.06 square miles (0.16 km^{2}) is covered by water.

== Demographics ==
Historical population
| Census | Pop. | Note | %± |
|---|---|---|---|
| 1920 | 1,460 | | — |
| 1930 | 1,826 | | 25.1% |
| 1940 | 2,118 | | 16.0% |
| 1950 | 2,773 | | 30.9% |
| 1960 | 6,002 | | 116.4% |
| 1970 | 7,214 | | 20.2% |
| 1980 | 7,241 | | 0.4% |
| 1990 | 7,337 | | 1.3% |
| 2000 | 11,446 | | 56.0% |
| 2010 | 21,193 | | 85.2% |
| 2020 | 24,847 | | 17.2% |
| 2025 (est.) | 25,611 | | 3.1% |

=== 2020 census ===
As of the 2020 census, Avon had a population of 24,847. The median age was 40.7 years. 28.4% of residents were under the age of 18 and 16.5% of residents were 65 years of age or older. For every 100 females there were 94.1 males, and for every 100 females age 18 and over there were 89.9 males age 18 and over.

100.0% of residents lived in urban areas, while 0.0% lived in rural areas.

There were 8,821 households in Avon, of which 41.5% had children under the age of 18 living in them. Of all households, 64.2% were married-couple households, 10.6% were households with a male householder and no spouse or partner present, and 21.1% were households with a female householder and no spouse or partner present. About 20.4% of all households were made up of individuals and 11.8% had someone living alone who was 65 years of age or older.

There were 9,208 housing units, of which 4.2% were vacant. The homeowner vacancy rate was 0.8% and the rental vacancy rate was 9.2%.

Racial composition as of the 2020 census
| Race | Number | Percent |
|---|---|---|
| White | 21,484 | 86.5% |
| Black or African American | 657 | 2.6% |
| American Indian and Alaska Native | 25 | 0.1% |
| Asian | 986 | 4.0% |
| Native Hawaiian and Other Pacific Islander | 1 | 0.0% |
| Some other race | 276 | 1.1% |
| Two or more races | 1,418 | 5.7% |
| Hispanic or Latino (of any race) | 1,197 | 4.8% |

=== 2010 census ===
As of the census of 2010, 21,193 people, 7,584 households, and 5,750 families resided in the city. The population density was 1,018.4 inhabitants per square mile (393.2/km^{2}). There were 8,007 housing units at a density of 384.8 per square mile (148.6/km^{2}). The racial makeup of the city was 92.4% White, 2.3% African American, 0.1% Native American, 3.1% Asian, 0.7% from other races, and 1.4% from two or more races. Hispanics or Latinos of any race were 3.4% of the population.

Of the 7,584 households, 42.9% had children under the age of 18 living with them, 65.2% were married couples living together, 7.9% had a female householder with no husband present, 2.7% had a male householder with no wife present, and 24.2% were not families. About 20.6% of all households were made up of individuals, and 8.9% had someone living alone who was 65 years of age or older. The average household size was 2.76 and the average family size was 3.23.

The median age in the city was 38.4 years; 30.5% of residents were under the age of 18; 4.1% were between the ages of 18 and 24; 27.3% were from 25 to 44; 25.4% were from 45 to 64; and 12.6% were 65 years of age or older. The gender makeup of the city was 48.4% male and 51.6% female.

Of the city's population over the age of 25, 49.4% hold a bachelor's degree or higher.

=== 2000 census ===
As of the census of 2000, 11,446 people, 4,088 households, and 3,143 families lived in the city. The population density was 548.4 people per mi^{2} (211.8/km^{2}). The 4,291 housing units averaged 205.6 per mi^{2} (79.4/km^{2}). The racial makeup of the city was 97.02% White, 0.72% African American, 0.17% Native American, 1.03% Asian, 0.24% from other races, and 0.81% from two or more races. Hispanics or Latinos of any race were 1.28% of the population.

Of 4,088 households, 37.9% had children under the age of 18 living with them, 67.7% were married couples living together, 6.4% had a female householder with no husband present, and 23.1% were not families. About 19.7% of all households were made up of individuals, and 6.8% had someone living alone who was 65 years of age or older. The average household size was 2.72 and the average family size was 3.15.

In the city, the population was distributed as 27.6% under the age of 18, 4.7% from 18 to 24, 31.5% from 25 to 44, 23.8% from 45 to 64, and 12.4% who were 65 years of age or older. The median age was 38 years. For every 100 females, there were 94.9 males. For every 100 females age 18 and over, there were 92.6 males.

The median income for a household in the city was $66,747, and for a family was $75,951. Males had a median income of $53,973 versus $31,660 for females. The per capita income for the city was $28,334. About 1.0% of families and 1.9% of the population were below the poverty line, including 0.9% of those under age 18 and 2.5% of those age 65 or over.

== Government ==
The city typically votes for the Republican Party in federal and state elections. In local elections, all candidates run without a party affiliation. Therefore, all city office holders are unaffiliated with a political party.

City Leadership
| Office Title | Incumbent | Term Expiration Date |
Executive
| Mayor | Bryan Jensen | December 31, 2029 |
At-Large Officials
| Council President | Brian Fischer | December 31, 2027 |
| | Mary Berges | December 31, 2027 |
| | Michelle Patton | December 31, 2027 |
Ward Officials
| Ward 1 | Jennifer Demaline | December 31, 2029 |
| Ward 2 | Anne Marie Etienne | December 31, 2029 |
| Ward 3 & Council President Pro Tem | Tony Moore | December 31, 2029 |
| Ward 4 | Scott Radcliffe | December 31, 2029 |

== Education ==
Avon Local School District operates three elementary schools, one middle school, and Avon High School. Avon Middle School was named a Blue Ribbon recipient for 2020 by the United States Department of Education.

Avon has a public library, a branch of the Lorain Public Library. As of October 2022, this library was under construction to add 16,000 square feet to the existing library after receiving the funds necessary for such an expansion after passing in a levy in May 2020. The expansion opened in January 2023.

== Notable people ==
- Al "Bubba" Baker (born 1956), former NFL player
- Alfred Richard "Red" Barr, (1908–1971) long serving Hall of Fame Southern Methodist University Swimming Coach from 1947 through 1971
- Gene Hickerson (1935–2008), professional football Hall of Famer
- Luke S. Johnson (1847–1910), Civil War soldier and Michigan state representative
- Chris Loschetter (born 1980), professional bowler on the PBA Tour
- Alex Ramirez (born 1974), outfielder for Yomiuri Giants of Nippon Professional Baseball, two-time MVP winner
- Harrison Williams (1873–1953), investor, entrepreneur, and multi-millionaire
