= Grafton, Ohio =

- Village
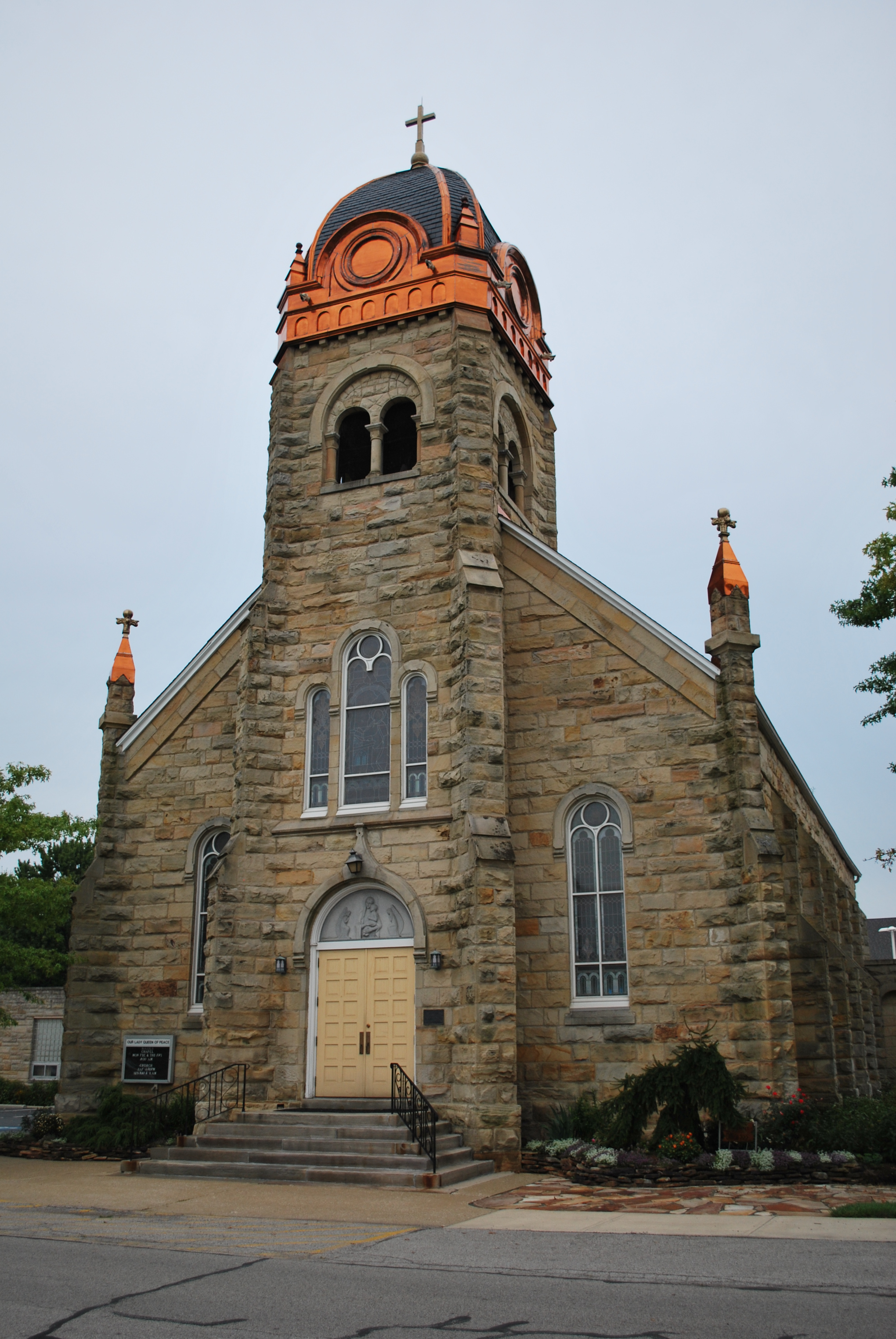
- Immaculate Conception Church

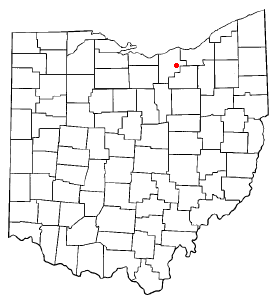
- Location of Grafton, Ohio

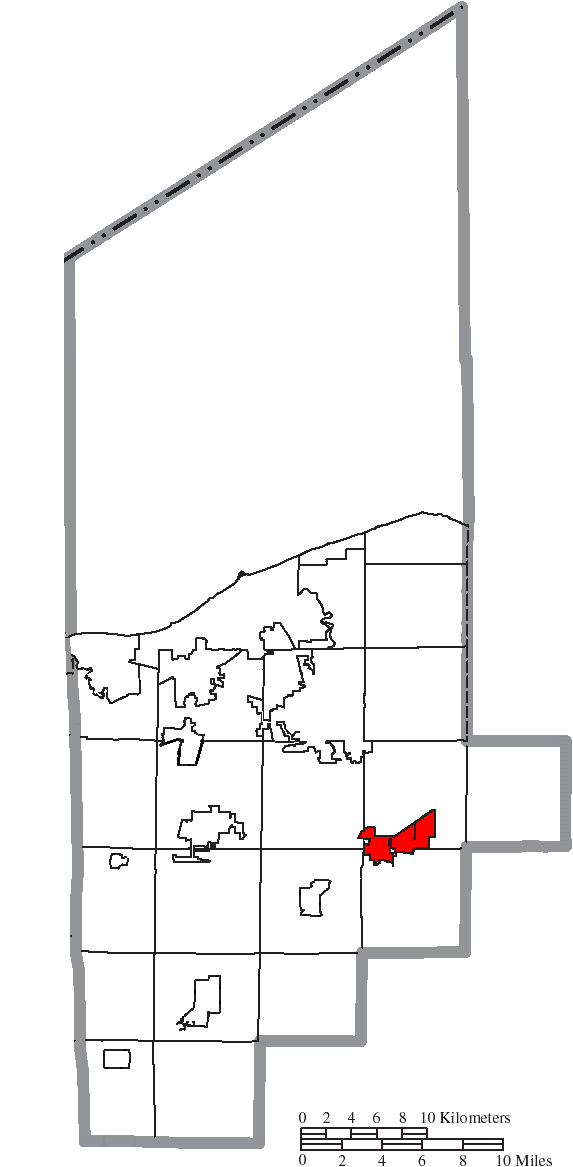
- Location of Grafton in Lorain County
- Coordinates: 41°16′51″N 82°02′17″W
- Country: United States
- State: Ohio
- County: Lorain

Area
  - Total: 4.96 sq mi (12.85 km^{2})
  - Land: 4.93 sq mi (12.77 km^{2})
  - Water: 0.031 sq mi (0.08 km^{2})
- Elevation: 810 ft (250 m)

Population (2020)
  - Total: 5,895
  - Estimate (2023): 5,773
  - Density: 1,195.4/sq mi (461.55/km^{2})
- Time zone: UTC-5 (Eastern (EST))
  - Summer (DST): UTC-4 (EDT)
- ZIP code: 44044
- Area code: 440
- FIPS code: 39-31150
- GNIS feature ID: 2398183
- Website: www.villageofgrafton.org

Grafton is a village in Lorain County, Ohio, United States, along the East Branch of the Black River. The population was 5,895 at the 2020 census. The Lorain Correctional Institution and several other prisons are located in and near Grafton.

== History ==
In 1846, Grafton was platted when the railroad was extended to that point. The village's name may be a transfer from Grafton, Massachusetts. To avoid confusion with Grafton Township and the communities of Grafton Center and Grafton Station, Grafton was renamed to Rawsonville in May 1852. The name reverted to Grafton upon incorporation as a village on January 1, 1877. On September 30, 1990, Grafton withdrew from Grafton and Eaton townships by forming a paper township named Rawsonville Township.

== Geography ==
According to the United States Census Bureau, the village has a total area of 4.74 square miles (12.28 km^{2}), of which 4.71 square miles (12.20 km^{2}) is land and 0.03 square miles (0.08 km^{2}) is water.

== Demographics ==
Historical population
Census	Pop.	Note	%±
1890	600		—
1900	1,098		83.0%
1910	955		−13.0%
1920	900		−5.8%
1930	935		3.9%
1940	971		3.9%
1950	1,194		23.0%
1960	1,683		41.0%
1970	1,771		5.2%
1980	2,231		26.0%
1990	3,344		49.9%
2000	2,302		−31.2%
2010	6,636		188.3%
2020	5,895		−11.2%
2023 (est.)	5,773	▼	−2.1%

=== 2010 census ===
As of the census of 2010, there were 6,636 people, 965 households, and 726 families living in the village. The population density was 1,408.9 inhabitants per square mile (544.0/km^{2}). There were 1,008 housing units at an average density of 214.0 per square mile (82.6/km^{2}). The racial makeup of the village was 65.0% White, 32.7% African American, 0.2% Native American, 0.3% Asian, 1.2% from other races, and 0.7% from two or more races. Hispanic or Latino of any race were 2.3% of the population.

There were 965 households, of which 37.9% had children under the age of 18 living with them, 56.0% were married couples living together, 13.5% had a female householder with no husband present, 5.8% had a male householder with no wife present, and 24.8% were non-families. 20.1% of all households were made up of individuals, and 7.4% had someone living alone who was 65 years of age or older. The average household size was 2.68 and the average family size was 3.07.

The median age in the village was 36.2 years. 10.4% of residents were under the age of 18; 13.7% were between the ages of 18 and 24; 43.9% were from 25 to 44; 26.3% were from 45 to 64; and 5.6% were 65 years of age or older. The gender makeup of the village was 79.7% male and 20.3% female.

=== 2000 census ===
As of the census of 2000, there were 2,302 people, 832 households, and 643 families living in the village. The population density was 510.0 inhabitants per square mile (196.9/km^{2}). There were 853 housing units at an average density of 189.0 per square mile (73.0/km^{2}). The racial makeup of the village was 97.83% White, 0.52% African American, 0.35% Native American, 0.26% Asian, 0.22% from other races, and 0.83% from two or more races. Hispanic or Latino of any race were 0.74% of the population.

There were 832 households, out of which 38.2% had children under the age of 18 living with them, 60.7% were married couples living together, 12.4% had a female householder with no husband present, and 22.6% were non-families. 19.4% of all households were made up of individuals, and 8.7% had someone living alone who was 65 years of age or older. The average household size was 2.77 and the average family size was 3.17.

In the village, the population was spread out, with 28.2% under the age of 18, 8.1% from 18 to 24, 30.5% from 25 to 44, 23.2% from 45 to 64, and 10.0% who were 65 years of age or older. The median age was 35 years. For every 100 females there were 93.6 males. For every 100 females age 18 and over, there were 90.4 males.

The median income for a household in the village was $52,446, and the median income for a family was $60,139. Males had a median income of $40,833 versus $26,732 for females. The per capita income for the village was $19,584. About 0.7% of families and 2.4% of the population were below the poverty line, including 1.8% of those under age 18 and 4.0% of those age 65 or over.

== Notable people ==
- Ryan Feierabend, MLB player
- Eric Lauer, MLB player
- Ed McKean, MLB player
