= Common year starting on Monday =

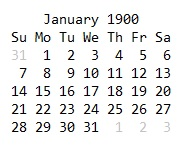

A common year starting on Monday is any non-leap year (i.e., a year with 365 days) that begins on Monday, 1 January, and ends on Monday, 31 December. Its dominical letter hence is G. The most recent year of such kind was 2018, and the next one will be 2029 in the Gregorian calendar, or likewise, 2019 and 2030 in the Julian calendar, see below for more. This common year is one of the three possible common years in which a century year can begin on and occurs in century years that yield a remainder of 300 when divided by 400. The most recent such year was 1900, and the next one will be 2300.

Any common year that starts on Monday has two Friday the 13ths: those two in this common year occur in April and July. Leap years starting on Sunday share this characteristic, but also have another in January. From July of the year in this type of year to September in the year that follows this type of year is the longest period that occurs without a Friday the 13th, unless the following year is a leap year starting on Tuesday, in which case the gap is only 11 months, as the next Friday the 13th is already in June.

== Calendars ==
Calendar for any common year starting on Monday,
presented as common in many English-speaking areas

| | January |
| Su | Mo | Tu | We | Th | Fr | Sa |
| | 1 | 2 | 3 | 4 | 5 | 6 |
| 7 | 8 | 9 | 10 | 11 | 12 | 13 |
| 14 | 15 | 16 | 17 | 18 | 19 | 20 |
| 21 | 22 | 23 | 24 | 25 | 26 | 27 |
| 28 | 29 | 30 | 31 |

| | February |
| Su | Mo | Tu | We | Th | Fr | Sa |
| | | | | 1 | 2 | 3 |
| 4 | 5 | 6 | 7 | 8 | 9 | 10 |
| 11 | 12 | 13 | 14 | 15 | 16 | 17 |
| 18 | 19 | 20 | 21 | 22 | 23 | 24 |
| 25 | 26 | 27 | 28 |

| | March |
| Su | Mo | Tu | We | Th | Fr | Sa |
| | | | | 1 | 2 | 3 |
| 4 | 5 | 6 | 7 | 8 | 9 | 10 |
| 11 | 12 | 13 | 14 | 15 | 16 | 17 |
| 18 | 19 | 20 | 21 | 22 | 23 | 24 |
| 25 | 26 | 27 | 28 | 29 | 30 | 31 |

| | April |
| Su | Mo | Tu | We | Th | Fr | Sa |
| 1 | 2 | 3 | 4 | 5 | 6 | 7 |
| 8 | 9 | 10 | 11 | 12 | 13 | 14 |
| 15 | 16 | 17 | 18 | 19 | 20 | 21 |
| 22 | 23 | 24 | 25 | 26 | 27 | 28 |
| 29 | 30 |

| | May |
| Su | Mo | Tu | We | Th | Fr | Sa |
| | | 1 | 2 | 3 | 4 | 5 |
| 6 | 7 | 8 | 9 | 10 | 11 | 12 |
| 13 | 14 | 15 | 16 | 17 | 18 | 19 |
| 20 | 21 | 22 | 23 | 24 | 25 | 26 |
| 27 | 28 | 29 | 30 | 31 |

| | June |
| Su | Mo | Tu | We | Th | Fr | Sa |
| | | | | | 1 | 2 |
| 3 | 4 | 5 | 6 | 7 | 8 | 9 |
| 10 | 11 | 12 | 13 | 14 | 15 | 16 |
| 17 | 18 | 19 | 20 | 21 | 22 | 23 |
| 24 | 25 | 26 | 27 | 28 | 29 | 30 |

| | July |
| Su | Mo | Tu | We | Th | Fr | Sa |
| 1 | 2 | 3 | 4 | 5 | 6 | 7 |
| 8 | 9 | 10 | 11 | 12 | 13 | 14 |
| 15 | 16 | 17 | 18 | 19 | 20 | 21 |
| 22 | 23 | 24 | 25 | 26 | 27 | 28 |
| 29 | 30 | 31 |

| | August |
| Su | Mo | Tu | We | Th | Fr | Sa |
| | | | 1 | 2 | 3 | 4 |
| 5 | 6 | 7 | 8 | 9 | 10 | 11 |
| 12 | 13 | 14 | 15 | 16 | 17 | 18 |
| 19 | 20 | 21 | 22 | 23 | 24 | 25 |
| 26 | 27 | 28 | 29 | 30 | 31 |

| | September |
| Su | Mo | Tu | We | Th | Fr | Sa |
| | | | | | | 1 |
| 2 | 3 | 4 | 5 | 6 | 7 | 8 |
| 9 | 10 | 11 | 12 | 13 | 14 | 15 |
| 16 | 17 | 18 | 19 | 20 | 21 | 22 |
| 23 | 24 | 25 | 26 | 27 | 28 | 29 |
| 30 |

| | October |
| Su | Mo | Tu | We | Th | Fr | Sa |
| | 1 | 2 | 3 | 4 | 5 | 6 |
| 7 | 8 | 9 | 10 | 11 | 12 | 13 |
| 14 | 15 | 16 | 17 | 18 | 19 | 20 |
| 21 | 22 | 23 | 24 | 25 | 26 | 27 |
| 28 | 29 | 30 | 31 |

| | November |
| Su | Mo | Tu | We | Th | Fr | Sa |
| | | | | 1 | 2 | 3 |
| 4 | 5 | 6 | 7 | 8 | 9 | 10 |
| 11 | 12 | 13 | 14 | 15 | 16 | 17 |
| 18 | 19 | 20 | 21 | 22 | 23 | 24 |
| 25 | 26 | 27 | 28 | 29 | 30 |

| | December |
| Su | Mo | Tu | We | Th | Fr | Sa |
| | | | | | | 1 |
| 2 | 3 | 4 | 5 | 6 | 7 | 8 |
| 9 | 10 | 11 | 12 | 13 | 14 | 15 |
| 16 | 17 | 18 | 19 | 20 | 21 | 22 |
| 23 | 24 | 25 | 26 | 27 | 28 | 29 |
| 30 | 31 |

ISO 8601-conformant calendar with week numbers for
any common year starting on Monday (dominical letter G)

| | January |
| Wk | Mo | Tu | We | Th | Fr | Sa | Su |
| 01 | 01 | 02 | 03 | 04 | 05 | 06 | 07 |
| 02 | 08 | 09 | 10 | 11 | 12 | 13 | 14 |
| 03 | 15 | 16 | 17 | 18 | 19 | 20 | 21 |
| 04 | 22 | 23 | 24 | 25 | 26 | 27 | 28 |
| 05 | 29 | 30 | 31 |

| | February |
| Wk | Mo | Tu | We | Th | Fr | Sa | Su |
| 05 | | | | 01 | 02 | 03 | 04 |
| 06 | 05 | 06 | 07 | 08 | 09 | 10 | 11 |
| 07 | 12 | 13 | 14 | 15 | 16 | 17 | 18 |
| 08 | 19 | 20 | 21 | 22 | 23 | 24 | 25 |
| 09 | 26 | 27 | 28 |

| | March |
| Wk | Mo | Tu | We | Th | Fr | Sa | Su |
| 09 | | | | 01 | 02 | 03 | 04 |
| 10 | 05 | 06 | 07 | 08 | 09 | 10 | 11 |
| 11 | 12 | 13 | 14 | 15 | 16 | 17 | 18 |
| 12 | 19 | 20 | 21 | 22 | 23 | 24 | 25 |
| 13 | 26 | 27 | 28 | 29 | 30 | 31 |

| | April |
| Wk | Mo | Tu | We | Th | Fr | Sa | Su |
| 13 | | | | | | | 01 |
| 14 | 02 | 03 | 04 | 05 | 06 | 07 | 08 |
| 15 | 09 | 10 | 11 | 12 | 13 | 14 | 15 |
| 16 | 16 | 17 | 18 | 19 | 20 | 21 | 22 |
| 17 | 23 | 24 | 25 | 26 | 27 | 28 | 29 |
| 18 | 30 |

| | May |
| Wk | Mo | Tu | We | Th | Fr | Sa | Su |
| 18 | | 01 | 02 | 03 | 04 | 05 | 06 |
| 19 | 07 | 08 | 09 | 10 | 11 | 12 | 13 |
| 20 | 14 | 15 | 16 | 17 | 18 | 19 | 20 |
| 21 | 21 | 22 | 23 | 24 | 25 | 26 | 27 |
| 22 | 28 | 29 | 30 | 31 |

| | June |
| Wk | Mo | Tu | We | Th | Fr | Sa | Su |
| 22 | | | | | 01 | 02 | 03 |
| 23 | 04 | 05 | 06 | 07 | 08 | 09 | 10 |
| 24 | 11 | 12 | 13 | 14 | 15 | 16 | 17 |
| 25 | 18 | 19 | 20 | 21 | 22 | 23 | 24 |
| 26 | 25 | 26 | 27 | 28 | 29 | 30 |

| | July |
| Wk | Mo | Tu | We | Th | Fr | Sa | Su |
| 26 | | | | | | | 01 |
| 27 | 02 | 03 | 04 | 05 | 06 | 07 | 08 |
| 28 | 09 | 10 | 11 | 12 | 13 | 14 | 15 |
| 29 | 16 | 17 | 18 | 19 | 20 | 21 | 22 |
| 30 | 23 | 24 | 25 | 26 | 27 | 28 | 29 |
| 31 | 30 | 31 |

| | August |
| Wk | Mo | Tu | We | Th | Fr | Sa | Su |
| 31 | | | 01 | 02 | 03 | 04 | 05 |
| 32 | 06 | 07 | 08 | 09 | 10 | 11 | 12 |
| 33 | 13 | 14 | 15 | 16 | 17 | 18 | 19 |
| 34 | 20 | 21 | 22 | 23 | 24 | 25 | 26 |
| 35 | 27 | 28 | 29 | 30 | 31 |

| | September |
| Wk | Mo | Tu | We | Th | Fr | Sa | Su |
| 35 | | | | | | 01 | 02 |
| 36 | 03 | 04 | 05 | 06 | 07 | 08 | 09 |
| 37 | 10 | 11 | 12 | 13 | 14 | 15 | 16 |
| 38 | 17 | 18 | 19 | 20 | 21 | 22 | 23 |
| 39 | 24 | 25 | 26 | 27 | 28 | 29 | 30 |

| | October |
| Wk | Mo | Tu | We | Th | Fr | Sa | Su |
| 40 | 01 | 02 | 03 | 04 | 05 | 06 | 07 |
| 41 | 08 | 09 | 10 | 11 | 12 | 13 | 14 |
| 42 | 15 | 16 | 17 | 18 | 19 | 20 | 21 |
| 43 | 22 | 23 | 24 | 25 | 26 | 27 | 28 |
| 44 | 29 | 30 | 31 |

| | November |
| Wk | Mo | Tu | We | Th | Fr | Sa | Su |
| 44 | | | | 01 | 02 | 03 | 04 |
| 45 | 05 | 06 | 07 | 08 | 09 | 10 | 11 |
| 46 | 12 | 13 | 14 | 15 | 16 | 17 | 18 |
| 47 | 19 | 20 | 21 | 22 | 23 | 24 | 25 |
| 48 | 26 | 27 | 28 | 29 | 30 |

| | December |
| Wk | Mo | Tu | We | Th | Fr | Sa | Su |
| 48 | | | | | | 01 | 02 |
| 49 | 03 | 04 | 05 | 06 | 07 | 08 | 09 |
| 50 | 10 | 11 | 12 | 13 | 14 | 15 | 16 |
| 51 | 17 | 18 | 19 | 20 | 21 | 22 | 23 |
| 52 | 24 | 25 | 26 | 27 | 28 | 29 | 30 |
| 01 | 31 |

== Applicable years ==
=== Gregorian calendar ===
In the (currently used) Gregorian calendar, along with Sunday, Wednesday, Friday or Saturday, the fourteen types of year (seven common, seven leap) repeat in a 400-year cycle (20871 weeks). Forty-three common years per cycle or exactly 10.75% start on a Monday. The 28-year sub-cycle only spans across century years divisible by 400, e.g. 1600, 2000, and 2400.

Gregorian common years starting on Monday
| Decade | 1st | | 2nd | 3rd | | 4th | 5th | 6th | | 7th | 8th | | 9th | | 10th | |
|---|---|---|---|---|---|---|---|---|---|---|---|---|---|---|---|---|
| 16th century | prior to first adoption (proleptic) | | | | | | | | | | | | | | 1590 | |
| 17th century | 1601 | 1607 | 1618 | 1629 | | 1635 | 1646 | 1657 | | 1663 | 1674 | | 1685 | | 1691 | |
| 18th century | 1703 | | 1714 | 1725 | | 1731 | 1742 | 1753 | 1759 | — | 1770 | | 1781 | 1787 | 1798 | |
| 19th century | — | | 1810 | 1821 | 1827 | 1838 | 1849 | 1855 | | 1866 | 1877 | | 1883 | | 1894 | 1900 |
| 20th century | 1906 | | 1917 | 1923 | | 1934 | 1945 | 1951 | | 1962 | 1973 | 1979 | — | | 1990 | |
| 21st century | 2001 | 2007 | 2018 | 2029 | | 2035 | 2046 | 2057 | | 2063 | 2074 | | 2085 | | 2091 | |
| 22nd century | 2103 | | 2114 | 2125 | | 2131 | 2142 | 2153 | 2159 | — | 2170 | | 2181 | 2187 | 2198 | |
| 23rd century | — | | 2210 | 2221 | 2227 | 2238 | 2249 | 2255 | | 2266 | 2277 | | 2283 | | 2294 | 2300 |
| 24th century | 2306 | | 2317 | 2323 | | 2334 | 2345 | 2351 | | 2362 | 2373 | 2379 | — | | 2390 | |

400-year cycle
| 0–99 | 1 | 7 | 18 | 29 | 35 | 46 | 57 | 63 | 74 | 85 | 91 |
| 100–199 | 103 | 114 | 125 | 131 | 142 | 153 | 159 | 170 | 181 | 187 | 198 |
| 200–299 | 210 | 221 | 227 | 238 | 249 | 255 | 266 | 277 | 283 | 294 | |
| 300–399 | 300 | 306 | 317 | 323 | 334 | 345 | 351 | 362 | 373 | 379 | 390 |

=== Julian calendar ===
In the Julian calendar, the fourteen types of year (seven common, seven leap) repeat in a 28-year cycle (1461 weeks). This sequence occurs exactly once within a cycle, and every common letter thrice.

As the Julian calendar repeats after 28 years that means it will also repeat after 700 years, i.e. 25 cycles. The year's position in the cycle is given by the formula ((year + 8) mod 28) + 1). Years 6, 12 and 23 of the cycle are common years beginning on Monday. 2017 is year 10 of the cycle. Approximately 10.71% of all years are common years beginning on Monday.

Julian common years starting on Monday
| Decade | 1st | | 2nd | | 3rd | | 4th | | 5th | | 6th | | 7th | | 8th | | 9th | | 10th | |
|---|---|---|---|---|---|---|---|---|---|---|---|---|---|---|---|---|---|---|---|---|
| 14th century | 1302 | | 1313 | 1319 | 1330 | | — | | 1341 | 1347 | 1358 | | 1369 | | 1375 | | 1386 | | 1397 | |
| 15th century | 1403 | | 1414 | | 1425 | | 1431 | | 1442 | | 1453 | 1459 | 1470 | | — | | 1481 | 1487 | 1498 | |
| 16th century | 1509 | | 1515 | | 1526 | | 1537 | | 1543 | | 1554 | | 1565 | | 1571 | | 1582 | | 1593 | 1599 |
| 17th century | 1610 | | — | | 1621 | 1627 | 1638 | | 1649 | | 1655 | | 1666 | | 1677 | | 1683 | | 1694 | |
| 18th century | 1705 | | 1711 | | 1722 | | 1733 | 1739 | 1750 | | — | | 1761 | 1767 | 1778 | | 1789 | | 1795 | |
| 19th century | 1806 | | 1817 | | 1823 | | 1834 | | 1845 | | 1851 | | 1862 | | 1873 | 1879 | 1890 | | — | |
| 20th century | 1901 | 1907 | 1918 | | 1929 | | 1935 | | 1946 | | 1957 | | 1963 | | 1974 | | 1985 | | 1991 | |
| 21st century | 2002 | | 2013 | 2019 | 2030 | | — | | 2041 | 2047 | 2058 | | 2069 | | 2075 | | 2086 | | 2097 | |

== Holidays ==
=== International ===
- Valentine's Day falls on a Wednesday
- World Day for Grandparents and the Elderly falls on its earliest possible date, July 22
- Halloween falls on a Wednesday
- Christmas Day falls on a Tuesday

=== Roman Catholic Solemnities ===
- Epiphany falls on a Saturday
- Candlemas falls on a Friday
- Saint Joseph's Day falls on a Monday
- The Annunciation of Jesus falls on a Sunday
- The Nativity of John the Baptist falls on a Sunday
- The Solemnity of Saints Peter and Paul falls on a Friday
- The Transfiguration of Jesus falls on a Monday
- The Assumption of Mary falls on a Wednesday
- The Exaltation of the Holy Cross falls on a Friday
- All Saints' Day falls on a Thursday
- All Souls' Day falls on a Friday
- The Feast of Christ the King falls on November 25 (or on October 28 in versions of the calendar between 1925 and 1962)
- The First Sunday of Advent falls on December 2
- The Immaculate Conception falls on a Saturday
- Gaudete Sunday falls on December 16
- Rorate Sunday falls on December 23

=== Australia and New Zealand ===
- Australia Day falls on a Friday
- Waitangi Day falls on a Tuesday
- Daylight saving ends on its earliest possible date, April 1
- ANZAC Day falls on a Wednesday
- Mother's Day falls on May 13
- Father's Day falls on September 2
- Daylight saving begins on its latest possible date, September 30 in New Zealand and October 7 in Australia – this is the only common year where the period of standard time over the winter months lasts 26 weeks in New Zealand and 27 weeks in Australia (in all other common years, it lasts only 25 weeks in New Zealand and 26 weeks in Australia)

=== British Isles ===
- Saint David's Day falls on a Thursday
- Mother's Day falls on March 4, March 11, March 18, March 25 or April 1
- Saint Patrick's Day falls on a Saturday
- Daylight saving begins on its earliest possible date, March 25. This is the only year when First Sunday of Advent of the year preceding this type of year and start of daylight saving time are 16 weeks (112 days) apart, they are 17 weeks (119 days) apart in all other years.
- Saint George's Day falls on a Monday
- Father's Day falls on June 17
- Orangeman's Day falls on a Thursday
- Daylight saving ends on October 28
- Guy Fawkes Night falls on a Monday
- Saint Andrew's Day falls on a Friday

=== Canada ===
- Daylight saving begins on March 11
- Mother's Day falls on May 13
- Victoria Day falls on May 21
- Father's Day falls on June 17
- Canada Day falls on a Sunday
- Labour Day falls on September 3
- Thanksgiving Day falls on its earliest possible date, October 8
- Daylight saving ends on November 4

=== Denmark ===
- The Constitution Day falls on a Tuesday

=== Germany ===
- The reunification falls on a Wednesday

=== United States ===
- Martin Luther King Jr. Day falls on its earliest possible date, January 15
- President's Day falls on February 19
- Daylight saving begins on March 11
- Mother's Day falls on May 13
- Memorial Day falls on May 28
- Father's Day falls on June 17
- Juneteenth falls on a Tuesday
- Independence Day falls on a Wednesday
- Labor Day falls on September 3
- Grandparents' Day falls on September 9
- Columbus Day falls on its earliest possible date, October 8
- Daylight saving ends on November 4
- Thanksgiving Day falls on its earliest possible date, November 22
