= Common year starting on Friday =

A common year starting on Friday is any non-leap year (i.e. a year with 365 days) that begins on Friday, 1 January, and ends on Friday, 31 December. Its dominical letter hence is C. The most recent year of such kind was 2021, and the next one will be 2027 in the Gregorian calendar, or, likewise, 2022 and 2033 in the obsolete Julian calendar; see below for more. This common year is one of the three possible common years in which a century year can begin on, and occurs in century years that yield a remainder of 100 when divided by 400. The most recent such year was 1700, and the next one will be 2100.

Any common year that starts on Friday has only one Friday the 13th: the only one in this common year occurs in August. Leap years starting on Thursday share this characteristic, but also have another one in February.

From July of the year that precedes this type of year until September in this type of year is the longest period (14 months) that occurs without a Friday the 17th. Leap years starting on Tuesday share this characteristic, from August of the common year that precedes it to October in that type of year. This type of year also has the longest period (also 14 months) without a Tuesday the 13th, from July of this year until September of the next common year (that being on Saturday) and this happens 30 out of the 43 common years starting on Friday, unless the next year is a leap year (which is also a Saturday), then the period is reduced to only 11 months and this happens 13 out of the 43 common years starting on Friday.

From February until March in this type of year is also the shortest period (one month) that runs between two months that begin exactly on the first day of the week, in areas where Monday is regarded the first day of the week.

This is the one of two types of years overall where a rectangular February is possible, in places where Monday is considered to be the first day of the week. Common years starting on Thursday share this characteristic, when Sunday is considered to be the first day of the week.

Additionally, this type of year has three months (February, March, and November) beginning exactly on the first day of the week, in areas which Monday is considered the first day of the week. Leap years starting on Monday share this characteristic on the months of January, April, and July.

== Calendars ==
Calendar for any common year starting on Friday,
presented as common in many English-speaking areas

	January
Su	Mo	Tu	We	Th	Fr	Sa
					1	2
3	4	5	6	7	8	9
10	11	12	13	14	15	16
17	18	19	20	21	22	23
24	25	26	27	28	29	30
31

	February
Su	Mo	Tu	We	Th	Fr	Sa
	1	2	3	4	5	6
7	8	9	10	11	12	13
14	15	16	17	18	19	20
21	22	23	24	25	26	27
28

	March
Su	Mo	Tu	We	Th	Fr	Sa
	1	2	3	4	5	6
7	8	9	10	11	12	13
14	15	16	17	18	19	20
21	22	23	24	25	26	27
28	29	30	31

	April
Su	Mo	Tu	We	Th	Fr	Sa
				1	2	3
4	5	6	7	8	9	10
11	12	13	14	15	16	17
18	19	20	21	22	23	24
25	26	27	28	29	30

	May
Su	Mo	Tu	We	Th	Fr	Sa
						1
2	3	4	5	6	7	8
9	10	11	12	13	14	15
16	17	18	19	20	21	22
23	24	25	26	27	28	29
30	31

	June
Su	Mo	Tu	We	Th	Fr	Sa
		1	2	3	4	5
6	7	8	9	10	11	12
13	14	15	16	17	18	19
20	21	22	23	24	25	26
27	28	29	30

	July
Su	Mo	Tu	We	Th	Fr	Sa
				1	2	3
4	5	6	7	8	9	10
11	12	13	14	15	16	17
18	19	20	21	22	23	24
25	26	27	28	29	30	31

	August
Su	Mo	Tu	We	Th	Fr	Sa
1	2	3	4	5	6	7
8	9	10	11	12	13	14
15	16	17	18	19	20	21
22	23	24	25	26	27	28
29	30	31

	September
Su	Mo	Tu	We	Th	Fr	Sa
			1	2	3	4
5	6	7	8	9	10	11
12	13	14	15	16	17	18
19	20	21	22	23	24	25
26	27	28	29	30

	October
Su	Mo	Tu	We	Th	Fr	Sa
					1	2
3	4	5	6	7	8	9
10	11	12	13	14	15	16
17	18	19	20	21	22	23
24	25	26	27	28	29	30
31

	November
Su	Mo	Tu	We	Th	Fr	Sa
	1	2	3	4	5	6
7	8	9	10	11	12	13
14	15	16	17	18	19	20
21	22	23	24	25	26	27
28	29	30

	December
Su	Mo	Tu	We	Th	Fr	Sa
			1	2	3	4
5	6	7	8	9	10	11
12	13	14	15	16	17	18
19	20	21	22	23	24	25
26	27	28	29	30	31

ISO 8601-conformant calendar with week numbers for
any common year starting on Friday (dominical letter C)

	January
Wk	Mo	Tu	We	Th	Fr	Sa	Su
53					01	02	03
01	04	05	06	07	08	09	10
02	11	12	13	14	15	16	17
03	18	19	20	21	22	23	24
04	25	26	27	28	29	30	31

	February
Wk	Mo	Tu	We	Th	Fr	Sa	Su
05	01	02	03	04	05	06	07
06	08	09	10	11	12	13	14
07	15	16	17	18	19	20	21
08	22	23	24	25	26	27	28

	March
Wk	Mo	Tu	We	Th	Fr	Sa	Su
09	01	02	03	04	05	06	07
10	08	09	10	11	12	13	14
11	15	16	17	18	19	20	21
12	22	23	24	25	26	27	28
13	29	30	31

	April
Wk	Mo	Tu	We	Th	Fr	Sa	Su
13				01	02	03	04
14	05	06	07	08	09	10	11
15	12	13	14	15	16	17	18
16	19	20	21	22	23	24	25
17	26	27	28	29	30

	May
Wk	Mo	Tu	We	Th	Fr	Sa	Su
17						01	02
18	03	04	05	06	07	08	09
19	10	11	12	13	14	15	16
20	17	18	19	20	21	22	23
21	24	25	26	27	28	29	30
22	31

	June
Wk	Mo	Tu	We	Th	Fr	Sa	Su
22		01	02	03	04	05	06
23	07	08	09	10	11	12	13
24	14	15	16	17	18	19	20
25	21	22	23	24	25	26	27
26	28	29	30

	July
Wk	Mo	Tu	We	Th	Fr	Sa	Su
26				01	02	03	04
27	05	06	07	08	09	10	11
28	12	13	14	15	16	17	18
29	19	20	21	22	23	24	25
30	26	27	28	29	30	31

	August
Wk	Mo	Tu	We	Th	Fr	Sa	Su
30							01
31	02	03	04	05	06	07	08
32	09	10	11	12	13	14	15
33	16	17	18	19	20	21	22
34	23	24	25	26	27	28	29
35	30	31

	September
Wk	Mo	Tu	We	Th	Fr	Sa	Su
35			01	02	03	04	05
36	06	07	08	09	10	11	12
37	13	14	15	16	17	18	19
38	20	21	22	23	24	25	26
39	27	28	29	30

	October
Wk	Mo	Tu	We	Th	Fr	Sa	Su
39					01	02	03
40	04	05	06	07	08	09	10
41	11	12	13	14	15	16	17
42	18	19	20	21	22	23	24
43	25	26	27	28	29	30	31

	November
Wk	Mo	Tu	We	Th	Fr	Sa	Su
44	01	02	03	04	05	06	07
45	08	09	10	11	12	13	14
46	15	16	17	18	19	20	21
47	22	23	24	25	26	27	28
48	29	30

	December
Wk	Mo	Tu	We	Th	Fr	Sa	Su
48			01	02	03	04	05
49	06	07	08	09	10	11	12
50	13	14	15	16	17	18	19
51	20	21	22	23	24	25	26
52	27	28	29	30	31

This is the only year type where the nth "Doomsday" (this year Sunday) is not in ISO week n; it is in ISO week n-1.

== Applicable years ==
=== Gregorian calendar ===
In the (currently used) Gregorian calendar, alongside Sunday, Monday, Wednesday or Saturday, the fourteen types of year (seven common, seven leap) repeat in a 400-year cycle (20871 weeks). Forty-three common years per cycle or exactly 10.75% start on a Friday. The 28-year sub-cycle only spans across century years divisible by 400, e.g. 1600, 2000, and 2400.

For this kind of year, the ISO week 10 (which begins March 8) and all subsequent ISO weeks occur later than in all other years, and exactly one week later than Leap years starting on Thursday. Also, the ISO weeks in January and February occur later than all other common years, but leap years starting on Friday share this characteristic in January and February, until ISO week 8.

Gregorian common years starting on Friday
Decade	1st	2nd		3rd		4th	5th		6th	7th	8th		9th	10th	
16th century	prior to first adoption (proleptic)												1582	1593	1599
17th century	1610	—		1621	1627	1638	1649		1655	1666	1677		1683	1694	1700
18th century	1706	1717		1723		1734	1745		1751	1762	1773	1779	1790	—	
19th century	1802	1813	1819	—		1830	1841	1847	1858	1869	1875		1886	1897	
20th century	1909	1915		1926		1937	1943		1954	1965	1971		1982	1993	1999
21st century	–	2010		2021	2027	2038	2049		2055	2066	2077		2083	2094	2100
22nd century	2106	2117		2123		2134	2145		2151	2162	2173	2179	2190	—	
23rd century	2202	2213	2219	2230		—	2241	2247	2258	2269	2275		2286	2297	
24th century	2309	2315		2326		2337	2343		2354	2365	2371		2382	2393	2399

400-year cycle
0–99	10	21	27	38	49	55	66	77	83	94	
100–199	100	106	117	123	134	145	151	162	173	179	190
200–299	202	213	219	230	241	247	258	269	275	286	297
300–399	309	315	326	337	343	354	365	371	382	393	399

=== Julian calendar ===
In the now-obsolete Julian calendar, the fourteen types of year (seven common, seven leap) repeat in a 28-year cycle (1461 weeks). This sequence occurs exactly once within a cycle, and every common letter thrice.

As the Julian calendar repeats after 28 years that means it will also repeat after 700 years, i.e. 25 cycles. The year's position in the cycle is given by the formula ((year + 8) mod 28) + 1). Years 4, 15 and 26 of the cycle are common years beginning on Friday. 2017 is year 10 of the cycle. Approximately 10.71% of all years are common years beginning on Friday.

Julian common years starting on Friday
Decade	1st		2nd		3rd		4th		5th		6th		7th		8th		9th		10th	
15th century	1406		1417		1423		1434		1445		1451		1462		1473	1479	1490		—	
16th century	1501	1507	1518		1529		1535		1546		1557		1563		1574		1585		1591	
17th century	1602		1613	1619	1630		—		1641	1647	1658		1669		1675		1686		1697	
18th century	1703		1714		1725		1731		1742		1753	1759	1770		—		1781	1787	1798	
19th century	1809		1815		1826		1837		1843		1854		1865		1871		1882		1893	1899
20th century	1910		—		1921	1927	1938		1949		1955		1966		1977		1983		1994	
21st century	2005		2011		2022		2033	2039	2050		—		2061	2067	2078		2089		2095	

== Holidays ==
=== International ===
- Valentine's Day falls on a Sunday
- World Day for Grandparents and the Elderly falls on July 25
- Halloween falls on a Sunday. This is the only year when Halloween falls in ISO week 43. They fall in ISO week 44 in all other years.
- Christmas Day falls on a Saturday

=== Roman Catholic Solemnities ===
- Epiphany falls on a Wednesday
- Candlemas falls on a Tuesday
- Saint Joseph's Day falls on a Friday
- The Annunciation of Jesus falls on a Thursday
- The Nativity of John the Baptist falls on a Thursday
- The Solemnity of Saints Peter and Paul falls on a Tuesday
- The Transfiguration of Jesus falls on a Friday
- The Assumption of Mary falls on a Sunday
- The Exaltation of the Holy Cross falls on a Tuesday
- All Saints' Day falls on a Monday
- All Souls' Day falls on a Tuesday
- The Feast of Christ the King falls on November 21 (or on its latest possible date of October 31 in versions of the calendar between 1925 and 1962)
- The First Sunday of Advent falls on November 28
- The Immaculate Conception falls on a Wednesday
- Gaudete Sunday falls on December 12
- Rorate Sunday falls on December 19

=== Australia and New Zealand ===
- Australia Day falls on a Tuesday
- Waitangi Day falls on a Saturday
- Daylight saving ends on April 4
- ANZAC Day falls on a Sunday, and in some years coincides with Easter Sunday falling on its latest possible date
- Mother's Day falls on May 9
- Father's Day falls on September 5
- Daylight saving begins on September 26 in New Zealand and October 3 in Australia

=== British Isles ===
- Saint David's Day falls on a Monday
- Mother's Day falls on March 7, March 14, March 21, March 28 or on its latest possible date of April 4
- Daylight saving begins on March 28
- Saint Patrick's Day falls on a Wednesday
- Saint George's Day falls on a Friday, and in some years coincides with Good Friday falling on its latest possible date
- Father's Day falls on June 20
- Orangeman's Day falls on a Monday
- Daylight saving ends on its latest possible date, October 31
- Guy Fawkes Night falls on a Friday
- Saint Andrew's Day falls on a Tuesday

=== Canada ===
- Daylight saving begins on its latest possible date, March 14
- Mother's Day falls on May 9
- Victoria Day falls on its latest possible date, May 24
- Father's Day falls on June 20
- Canada Day falls on a Thursday
- Labour Day falls on September 6
- Thanksgiving Day falls on October 11
- Daylight saving ends on its latest possible date, November 7

=== Denmark ===
- The Constitution Day falls on a Saturday

=== Germany ===
- The reunification falls on a Sunday

=== United States ===
- Martin Luther King Jr. Day falls on January 18
- President's Day falls on its earliest possible date, February 15
- Daylight saving begins on its latest possible date, March 14
- Mother's Day falls on May 9
- Memorial Day falls on its latest possible date, May 31
- Juneteenth falls on a Saturday
- Father's Day falls on June 20
- Independence Day falls on a Sunday
- Labor Day falls on September 6
- Grandparents' Day falls on September 12
- Columbus Day falls on October 11
- Daylight saving ends on its latest possible date, November 7
- Thanksgiving Day falls on November 25
