= List of future calendar events =

This list assumes that these calendars continue to be used in their current form without further adjustments.

Years from now	Gregorian date	Event
51	2077	Beginning of the 16th century in the Islamic calendar.
70	2096	Ash Wednesday will occur on February 29 (leap day) for the first time since the start of the Gregorian calendar in 1582.
74	2100, March 1	First century common year since 1900.
74	2100, March 14	On March 14 (which will be February 29 in the Julian calendar), the difference between the Julian calendar and the Gregorian calendar reaches 14 days. Since 14 is divisible by 7, this will be the first time in history since its inception that the Gregorian calendar has the same day of the week for each day of the year as the Julian calendar. This will last until February 28, 2200 of the Gregorian Calendar.
75	2101	Beginning of the 22nd century in the Gregorian calendar.
188	2214	Rosh Hashanah will fall on October 6 for the first time.
213	2239 September 29	The Year 6000 begins in the Hebrew calendar.
234	2260	Rosh Hashanah will fall on September 6 for the last time in over 10,000 years.
259	2285	Unless changes are made in the religious calendar, the Western Easter will fall on March 22 for the first time since 1818, the earliest possible date on which Easter can occur.
327	2353	The date of Easter as conventionally calculated will be five weeks earlier than its hypothetical date according to astronomical principles, in a "negative equinoctial paradox". Along with 2372, this will be one of only two such occurrences between 2020 and 4000.
346	2372	The date of Easter will see another "negative equinoctial paradox", this time four weeks earlier than its hypothetical date. This will be the last such occurrence before the year 4000.
365	2391	Palm Sunday and Saint Patrick's Day will coincide for the first time since 1940; the "wearing of the shamrock and the palm together" was seen as presaging a great event in Ireland.
374	2400	The first century leap year since 2000.
551	2577	Beginning of the 21st century and the 3rd millennium in the Islamic calendar.
774	2800, March 1	The second century leap year in the 3rd millennium, in accordance with the Gregorian calendar. The Revised Julian Calendar, however, observes a leap year in 2900 instead; those Orthodox Churches (e.g. Greek) using the Revised Julian Calendar to calculate fixed-date feasts will, if no changes are made to the calendar before then, celebrate fixed-date feasts a day earlier than Catholic and Protestant churches from March 2800 until February 2900. For example, through this century, such Orthodox Churches will be celebrating Christmas Day while simultaneously Catholic and Protestant churches are marking Christmas Eve.
974	3000	The end of the 30th century and the 3rd millennium in the Gregorian calendar.
975	3001	Beginning of the 31st century and the 4th millennium in the Gregorian calendar.
2,746	4772 October 13	The Mesoamerican Long Count calendar, assuming a turnover value of 20 b'ak'tuns, will require a sixth order.
2,883	4909	The Gregorian calendar will be a full day ahead of the solar year.
3,983	6009	The first Strobogrammatic numbered year since 1961.
10,000	12026	The Gregorian calendar will have drifted by about 10 days in relation to the seasons.
10,866	June 10, AD 12,892	In the Hebrew calendar, due to a gradual drift in relation to the solar year, Passover will fall on the northern summer solstice (it has historically fallen around the spring equinox).
18,848	AD 20,874	The lunar Islamic calendar and the solar Gregorian calendar will share the same year number. After this, the shorter Islamic calendar will slowly overtake the Gregorian.
25,000	27026	The Tabular Islamic calendar will be roughly 10 days out of sync with the Moon's phases.
46,875	March 1, AD 48,901 (Note: Manually calculated from the fact that the calendars were 10 days apart in 1582 and grew further apart by 3 days every 400 years. March 1 AD 48900 (Julian) and March 1 AD 48901 (Gregorian) are both Tuesday.)	The Julian calendar (365.25 days) and Gregorian calendar (365.2425 days) will be one year apart. The Julian day number (a measure used by astronomers) at Greenwich mean midnight (start of day) is 19 581 842.5 for both dates.

== See also ==
- List of future astronomical events
- Timeline of the far future
