= Leap year starting on Sunday =

A leap year starting on Sunday is any year with 366 days (i.e. it includes 29 February) that begins on Sunday, 1 January, and ends on Monday, 31 December. Its dominical letters hence are AG. The most recent year of such kind was 2012, and the next one will be 2040 in the Gregorian calendar or, likewise 2024 and 2052 in the obsolete Julian calendar.

This is the only leap year with three occurrences of Friday the 13th: those three in this leap year occur three months (13 weeks) apart: in January, April, and July. Common years starting on Thursday share this characteristic, in the months of February, March, and November. Similarly, Common years starting on Wednesday also have three Friday the 13th's within a three month (13-week) gap between them, the former two being in the common year preceding that type of leap year in September and December, and the latter being in that type of year in March.

== Calendars ==
Calendar for any leap year starting on Sunday,
presented as common in many English-speaking areas

| | January |
| Su | Mo | Tu | We | Th | Fr | Sa |
| 1 | 2 | 3 | 4 | 5 | 6 | 7 |
| 8 | 9 | 10 | 11 | 12 | 13 | 14 |
| 15 | 16 | 17 | 18 | 19 | 20 | 21 |
| 22 | 23 | 24 | 25 | 26 | 27 | 28 |
| 29 | 30 | 31 |

| | February |
| Su | Mo | Tu | We | Th | Fr | Sa |
| | | | 1 | 2 | 3 | 4 |
| 5 | 6 | 7 | 8 | 9 | 10 | 11 |
| 12 | 13 | 14 | 15 | 16 | 17 | 18 |
| 19 | 20 | 21 | 22 | 23 | 24 | 25 |
| 26 | 27 | 28 | 29 |

| | March |
| Su | Mo | Tu | We | Th | Fr | Sa |
| | | | | 1 | 2 | 3 |
| 4 | 5 | 6 | 7 | 8 | 9 | 10 |
| 11 | 12 | 13 | 14 | 15 | 16 | 17 |
| 18 | 19 | 20 | 21 | 22 | 23 | 24 |
| 25 | 26 | 27 | 28 | 29 | 30 | 31 |

| | April |
| Su | Mo | Tu | We | Th | Fr | Sa |
| 1 | 2 | 3 | 4 | 5 | 6 | 7 |
| 8 | 9 | 10 | 11 | 12 | 13 | 14 |
| 15 | 16 | 17 | 18 | 19 | 20 | 21 |
| 22 | 23 | 24 | 25 | 26 | 27 | 28 |
| 29 | 30 |

| | May |
| Su | Mo | Tu | We | Th | Fr | Sa |
| | | 1 | 2 | 3 | 4 | 5 |
| 6 | 7 | 8 | 9 | 10 | 11 | 12 |
| 13 | 14 | 15 | 16 | 17 | 18 | 19 |
| 20 | 21 | 22 | 23 | 24 | 25 | 26 |
| 27 | 28 | 29 | 30 | 31 |

| | June |
| Su | Mo | Tu | We | Th | Fr | Sa |
| | | | | | 1 | 2 |
| 3 | 4 | 5 | 6 | 7 | 8 | 9 |
| 10 | 11 | 12 | 13 | 14 | 15 | 16 |
| 17 | 18 | 19 | 20 | 21 | 22 | 23 |
| 24 | 25 | 26 | 27 | 28 | 29 | 30 |

| | July |
| Su | Mo | Tu | We | Th | Fr | Sa |
| 1 | 2 | 3 | 4 | 5 | 6 | 7 |
| 8 | 9 | 10 | 11 | 12 | 13 | 14 |
| 15 | 16 | 17 | 18 | 19 | 20 | 21 |
| 22 | 23 | 24 | 25 | 26 | 27 | 28 |
| 29 | 30 | 31 |

| | August |
| Su | Mo | Tu | We | Th | Fr | Sa |
| | | | 1 | 2 | 3 | 4 |
| 5 | 6 | 7 | 8 | 9 | 10 | 11 |
| 12 | 13 | 14 | 15 | 16 | 17 | 18 |
| 19 | 20 | 21 | 22 | 23 | 24 | 25 |
| 26 | 27 | 28 | 29 | 30 | 31 |

| | September |
| Su | Mo | Tu | We | Th | Fr | Sa |
| | | | | | | 1 |
| 2 | 3 | 4 | 5 | 6 | 7 | 8 |
| 9 | 10 | 11 | 12 | 13 | 14 | 15 |
| 16 | 17 | 18 | 19 | 20 | 21 | 22 |
| 23 | 24 | 25 | 26 | 27 | 28 | 29 |
| 30 |

| | October |
| Su | Mo | Tu | We | Th | Fr | Sa |
| | 1 | 2 | 3 | 4 | 5 | 6 |
| 7 | 8 | 9 | 10 | 11 | 12 | 13 |
| 14 | 15 | 16 | 17 | 18 | 19 | 20 |
| 21 | 22 | 23 | 24 | 25 | 26 | 27 |
| 28 | 29 | 30 | 31 |

| | November |
| Su | Mo | Tu | We | Th | Fr | Sa |
| | | | | 1 | 2 | 3 |
| 4 | 5 | 6 | 7 | 8 | 9 | 10 |
| 11 | 12 | 13 | 14 | 15 | 16 | 17 |
| 18 | 19 | 20 | 21 | 22 | 23 | 24 |
| 25 | 26 | 27 | 28 | 29 | 30 |

| | December |
| Su | Mo | Tu | We | Th | Fr | Sa |
| | | | | | | 1 |
| 2 | 3 | 4 | 5 | 6 | 7 | 8 |
| 9 | 10 | 11 | 12 | 13 | 14 | 15 |
| 16 | 17 | 18 | 19 | 20 | 21 | 22 |
| 23 | 24 | 25 | 26 | 27 | 28 | 29 |
| 30 | 31 |

ISO 8601-conformant calendar with week numbers for
any leap year starting on Sunday (dominical letter AG)

| | January |
| Wk | Mo | Tu | We | Th | Fr | Sa | Su |
| 52 | | | | | | | 01 |
| 01 | 02 | 03 | 04 | 05 | 06 | 07 | 08 |
| 02 | 09 | 10 | 11 | 12 | 13 | 14 | 15 |
| 03 | 16 | 17 | 18 | 19 | 20 | 21 | 22 |
| 04 | 23 | 24 | 25 | 26 | 27 | 28 | 29 |
| 05 | 30 | 31 |

| | February |
| Wk | Mo | Tu | We | Th | Fr | Sa | Su |
| 05 | | | 01 | 02 | 03 | 04 | 05 |
| 06 | 06 | 07 | 08 | 09 | 10 | 11 | 12 |
| 07 | 13 | 14 | 15 | 16 | 17 | 18 | 19 |
| 08 | 20 | 21 | 22 | 23 | 24 | 25 | 26 |
| 09 | 27 | 28 | 29 |

| | March |
| Wk | Mo | Tu | We | Th | Fr | Sa | Su |
| 09 | | | | 01 | 02 | 03 | 04 |
| 10 | 05 | 06 | 07 | 08 | 09 | 10 | 11 |
| 11 | 12 | 13 | 14 | 15 | 16 | 17 | 18 |
| 12 | 19 | 20 | 21 | 22 | 23 | 24 | 25 |
| 13 | 26 | 27 | 28 | 29 | 30 | 31 |

| | April |
| Wk | Mo | Tu | We | Th | Fr | Sa | Su |
| 13 | | | | | | | 01 |
| 14 | 02 | 03 | 04 | 05 | 06 | 07 | 08 |
| 15 | 09 | 10 | 11 | 12 | 13 | 14 | 15 |
| 16 | 16 | 17 | 18 | 19 | 20 | 21 | 22 |
| 17 | 23 | 24 | 25 | 26 | 27 | 28 | 29 |
| 18 | 30 |

| | May |
| Wk | Mo | Tu | We | Th | Fr | Sa | Su |
| 18 | | 01 | 02 | 03 | 04 | 05 | 06 |
| 19 | 07 | 08 | 09 | 10 | 11 | 12 | 13 |
| 20 | 14 | 15 | 16 | 17 | 18 | 19 | 20 |
| 21 | 21 | 22 | 23 | 24 | 25 | 26 | 27 |
| 22 | 28 | 29 | 30 | 31 |

| | June |
| Wk | Mo | Tu | We | Th | Fr | Sa | Su |
| 22 | | | | | 01 | 02 | 03 |
| 23 | 04 | 05 | 06 | 07 | 08 | 09 | 10 |
| 24 | 11 | 12 | 13 | 14 | 15 | 16 | 17 |
| 25 | 18 | 19 | 20 | 21 | 22 | 23 | 24 |
| 26 | 25 | 26 | 27 | 28 | 29 | 30 |

| | July |
| Wk | Mo | Tu | We | Th | Fr | Sa | Su |
| 26 | | | | | | | 01 |
| 27 | 02 | 03 | 04 | 05 | 06 | 07 | 08 |
| 28 | 09 | 10 | 11 | 12 | 13 | 14 | 15 |
| 29 | 16 | 17 | 18 | 19 | 20 | 21 | 22 |
| 30 | 23 | 24 | 25 | 26 | 27 | 28 | 29 |
| 31 | 30 | 31 |

| | August |
| Wk | Mo | Tu | We | Th | Fr | Sa | Su |
| 31 | | | 01 | 02 | 03 | 04 | 05 |
| 32 | 06 | 07 | 08 | 09 | 10 | 11 | 12 |
| 33 | 13 | 14 | 15 | 16 | 17 | 18 | 19 |
| 34 | 20 | 21 | 22 | 23 | 24 | 25 | 26 |
| 35 | 27 | 28 | 29 | 30 | 31 |

| | September |
| Wk | Mo | Tu | We | Th | Fr | Sa | Su |
| 35 | | | | | | 01 | 02 |
| 36 | 03 | 04 | 05 | 06 | 07 | 08 | 09 |
| 37 | 10 | 11 | 12 | 13 | 14 | 15 | 16 |
| 38 | 17 | 18 | 19 | 20 | 21 | 22 | 23 |
| 39 | 24 | 25 | 26 | 27 | 28 | 29 | 30 |

| | October |
| Wk | Mo | Tu | We | Th | Fr | Sa | Su |
| 40 | 01 | 02 | 03 | 04 | 05 | 06 | 07 |
| 41 | 08 | 09 | 10 | 11 | 12 | 13 | 14 |
| 42 | 15 | 16 | 17 | 18 | 19 | 20 | 21 |
| 43 | 22 | 23 | 24 | 25 | 26 | 27 | 28 |
| 44 | 29 | 30 | 31 |

| | November |
| Wk | Mo | Tu | We | Th | Fr | Sa | Su |
| 44 | | | | 01 | 02 | 03 | 04 |
| 45 | 05 | 06 | 07 | 08 | 09 | 10 | 11 |
| 46 | 12 | 13 | 14 | 15 | 16 | 17 | 18 |
| 47 | 19 | 20 | 21 | 22 | 23 | 24 | 25 |
| 48 | 26 | 27 | 28 | 29 | 30 |

| | December |
| Wk | Mo | Tu | We | Th | Fr | Sa | Su |
| 48 | | | | | | 01 | 02 |
| 49 | 03 | 04 | 05 | 06 | 07 | 08 | 09 |
| 50 | 10 | 11 | 12 | 13 | 14 | 15 | 16 |
| 51 | 17 | 18 | 19 | 20 | 21 | 22 | 23 |
| 52 | 24 | 25 | 26 | 27 | 28 | 29 | 30 |
| 01 | 31 |

== Applicable years ==
=== Gregorian Calendar ===
Leap years that begin on Sunday, along with those starting on Friday, occur most frequently: 15 of the 97 (≈ 15.46%) total leap years in a 400-year cycle of the Gregorian calendar. Thus, their overall occurrence is 3.75% (15 out of 400).

Gregorian leap years starting on Sunday
| Decade | 1st | 2nd | 3rd | 4th | 5th | 6th | 7th | 8th | 9th | 10th |
|---|---|---|---|---|---|---|---|---|---|---|
| 16th century | prior to first adoption (proleptic) | | | | | | | | 1584 | |
| 17th century | | 1612 | | | 1640 | | 1668 | | | 1696 |
| 18th century | 1708 | | | 1736 | | | 1764 | | | 1792 |
| 19th century | 1804 | | | 1832 | | | 1860 | | 1888 | |
| 20th century | | | 1928 | | | 1956 | | | 1984 | |
| 21st century | | 2012 | | | 2040 | | 2068 | | | 2096 |
| 22nd century | 2108 | | | 2136 | | | 2164 | | | 2192 |
| 23rd century | 2204 | | | 2232 | | | 2260 | | 2288 | |
| 24th century | | | 2328 | | | 2356 | | | 2384 | |
| 25th century | | 2412 | | | 2440 | | 2468 | | | 2496 |
| 26th century | 2508 | | | 2536 | | | 2564 | | | 2592 |
| 27th century | 2604 | | | 2632 | | 2660 | | | 2688 | |

400-year cycle
| 0–99 | 12 | 40 | 68 | 96 |
| 100–199 | 108 | 136 | 164 | 192 |
| 200–299 | 204 | 232 | 260 | 288 |
| 300–399 | 328 | 356 | 384 | |

=== Julian Calendar ===
Like all leap year types, the one starting with 1 January on a Sunday occurs exactly once in a 28-year cycle in the Julian calendar, i.e., in 3.57% of years. As the Julian calendar repeats after 28 years, it will also repeat after 700 years, i.e., 25 cycles. The formula gives the year's position in the cycle ((year + 8) mod 28) + 1).

Julian leap years starting on Sunday
| Decade | 1st | 2nd | 3rd | 4th | 5th | 6th | 7th | 8th | 9th | 10th |
|---|---|---|---|---|---|---|---|---|---|---|
| 15th century | 1408 | | | 1436 | | | 1464 | | | 1492 |
| 16th century | | 1520 | | | 1548 | | | 1576 | | |
| 17th century | 1604 | | | 1632 | | 1660 | | | 1688 | |
| 18th century | | 1716 | | | 1744 | | | 1772 | | 1800 |
| 19th century | | | 1828 | | | 1856 | | | 1884 | |
| 20th century | | 1912 | | 1940 | | | 1968 | | | 1996 |
| 21st century | | | 2024 | | | 2052 | | 2080 | | |
| 22nd century | 2108 | | | 2136 | | | 2164 | | | 2192 |

== Holidays ==
=== International ===
- Valentine's Day falls on a Tuesday
- The leap day (February 29) falls on a Wednesday
- World Day for Grandparents and the Elderly falls on its earliest possible date, July 22
- Halloween falls on a Wednesday
- Christmas Day falls on a Tuesday

=== Roman Catholic Solemnities ===
- Epiphany falls on a Friday
- Candlemas falls on a Thursday
- Saint Joseph's Day falls on a Monday
- The Annunciation of Jesus falls on a Sunday
- The Nativity of John the Baptist falls on a Sunday
- The Solemnity of Saints Peter and Paul falls on a Friday
- The Transfiguration of Jesus falls on a Monday
- The Assumption of Mary falls on a Wednesday
- The Exaltation of the Holy Cross falls on a Friday
- All Saints' Day falls on a Thursday
- All Souls' Day falls on a Friday
- The Feast of Christ the King falls on November 25 (or on October 28 in versions of the calendar between 1925 and 1962)
- The First Sunday of Advent falls on December 2
- The Immaculate Conception falls on a Saturday
- Gaudete Sunday falls on December 16
- Rorate Sunday falls on December 23

=== Australia and New Zealand ===
- Australia Day falls on a Thursday
- Waitangi Day falls on a Monday
- Daylight saving ends on its earliest possible date, April 1
- ANZAC Day falls on a Wednesday
- Mother's Day falls on May 13
- Father's Day falls on September 2
- Daylight saving begins on its latest possible date, September 30 in New Zealand and October 7 in Australia – this is the only leap year where the period of standard time over the winter months lasts 26 weeks in New Zealand and 27 weeks in Australia (in all other leap years, it lasts only 25 weeks in New Zealand and 26 weeks in Australia)

=== British Isles ===
- Saint David's Day falls on a Thursday
- Mother's Day falls on March 4, March 11, March 18, March 25 or April 1
- Saint Patrick's Day falls on a Saturday
- Daylight saving begins on its earliest possible date, March 25
- Saint George's Day falls on a Monday
- Father's Day falls on June 17
- Orangeman's Day falls on a Thursday
- Daylight saving ends on October 28
- Guy Fawkes Night falls on a Monday
- Saint Andrew's Day falls on a Friday

=== Canada ===
- Daylight saving begins on March 11
- Mother's Day falls on May 13
- Victoria Day falls on May 21
- Father's Day falls on June 17
- Canada Day falls on a Sunday
- Labour Day falls on September 3
- Thanksgiving Day falls on its earliest possible date, October 8
- Daylight saving ends on November 4

=== United States ===
- Martin Luther King Jr. Day falls on January 16
- President's Day falls on February 20
- Daylight saving begins on March 11
- Mother's Day falls on May 13
- Memorial Day falls on May 28
- Father's Day falls on June 17
- Juneteenth falls on a Tuesday
- Independence Day falls on a Wednesday
- Labor Day falls on September 3
- Grandparents' Day falls on September 9
- Columbus Day falls on its earliest possible date, October 8
- Daylight saving ends on November 4
- Election Day falls on November 6
- Thanksgiving Day falls on its earliest possible date, November 22
