= Leap year starting on Wednesday =

A leap year starting on Wednesday is any year with 366 days (i.e. it includes 29 February) that begins on Wednesday 1 January and ends on Thursday 31 December. Its dominical letters hence are ED. The most recent year of such kind was 2020, and the next one will be 2048 in the Gregorian calendar, or likewise, 2004 and 2032 in the obsolete Julian calendar, see below for more.

Any leap year that starts on Wednesday has two Friday the 13ths: those two in this leap year occur in March and November. Common years starting on Thursday share this characteristic, but also have another in February. Any leap year that starts on Wednesday has only one Saturday the 13th: the only one in this leap year occurs in June. Common years starting on Thursday also share this characteristic.

Leap years starting on Sunday also share a similar characteristic to this type of leap year, three Friday the 13th's have a three month (13-week) gap between them, the former two being in the common year preceding this type of leap year in September and December, and the latter being in this type of year in March. Leap years starting on Sunday share this by having January, April and July three months apart from each other.

== Calendars ==
Calendar for any leap year starting on Wednesday,
presented as common in many English-speaking areas

	January
Su	Mo	Tu	We	Th	Fr	Sa
			1	2	3	4
5	6	7	8	9	10	11
12	13	14	15	16	17	18
19	20	21	22	23	24	25
26	27	28	29	30	31

	February
Su	Mo	Tu	We	Th	Fr	Sa
						1
2	3	4	5	6	7	8
9	10	11	12	13	14	15
16	17	18	19	20	21	22
23	24	25	26	27	28	29

	March
Su	Mo	Tu	We	Th	Fr	Sa
1	2	3	4	5	6	7
8	9	10	11	12	13	14
15	16	17	18	19	20	21
22	23	24	25	26	27	28
29	30	31

	April
Su	Mo	Tu	We	Th	Fr	Sa
			1	2	3	4
5	6	7	8	9	10	11
12	13	14	15	16	17	18
19	20	21	22	23	24	25
26	27	28	29	30

	May
Su	Mo	Tu	We	Th	Fr	Sa
					1	2
3	4	5	6	7	8	9
10	11	12	13	14	15	16
17	18	19	20	21	22	23
24	25	26	27	28	29	30
31

	June
Su	Mo	Tu	We	Th	Fr	Sa
	1	2	3	4	5	6
7	8	9	10	11	12	13
14	15	16	17	18	19	20
21	22	23	24	25	26	27
28	29	30

	July
Su	Mo	Tu	We	Th	Fr	Sa
			1	2	3	4
5	6	7	8	9	10	11
12	13	14	15	16	17	18
19	20	21	22	23	24	25
26	27	28	29	30	31

	August
Su	Mo	Tu	We	Th	Fr	Sa
						1
2	3	4	5	6	7	8
9	10	11	12	13	14	15
16	17	18	19	20	21	22
23	24	25	26	27	28	29
30	31

	September
Su	Mo	Tu	We	Th	Fr	Sa
		1	2	3	4	5
6	7	8	9	10	11	12
13	14	15	16	17	18	19
20	21	22	23	24	25	26
27	28	29	30

	October
Su	Mo	Tu	We	Th	Fr	Sa
				1	2	3
4	5	6	7	8	9	10
11	12	13	14	15	16	17
18	19	20	21	22	23	24
25	26	27	28	29	30	31

	November
Su	Mo	Tu	We	Th	Fr	Sa
1	2	3	4	5	6	7
8	9	10	11	12	13	14
15	16	17	18	19	20	21
22	23	24	25	26	27	28
29	30

	December
Su	Mo	Tu	We	Th	Fr	Sa
		1	2	3	4	5
6	7	8	9	10	11	12
13	14	15	16	17	18	19
20	21	22	23	24	25	26
27	28	29	30	31

ISO 8601-conformant calendar with week numbers for
any leap year starting on Wednesday (dominical letter ED)

	January
Wk	Mo	Tu	We	Th	Fr	Sa	Su
01			01	02	03	04	05
02	06	07	08	09	10	11	12
03	13	14	15	16	17	18	19
04	20	21	22	23	24	25	26
05	27	28	29	30	31

	February
Wk	Mo	Tu	We	Th	Fr	Sa	Su
05						01	02
06	03	04	05	06	07	08	09
07	10	11	12	13	14	15	16
08	17	18	19	20	21	22	23
09	24	25	26	27	28	29

	March
Wk	Mo	Tu	We	Th	Fr	Sa	Su
09							01
10	02	03	04	05	06	07	08
11	09	10	11	12	13	14	15
12	16	17	18	19	20	21	22
13	23	24	25	26	27	28	29
14	30	31

	April
Wk	Mo	Tu	We	Th	Fr	Sa	Su
14			01	02	03	04	05
15	06	07	08	09	10	11	12
16	13	14	15	16	17	18	19
17	20	21	22	23	24	25	26
18	27	28	29	30

	May
Wk	Mo	Tu	We	Th	Fr	Sa	Su
18					01	02	03
19	04	05	06	07	08	09	10
20	11	12	13	14	15	16	17
21	18	19	20	21	22	23	24
22	25	26	27	28	29	30	31

	June
Wk	Mo	Tu	We	Th	Fr	Sa	Su
23	01	02	03	04	05	06	07
24	08	09	10	11	12	13	14
25	15	16	17	18	19	20	21
26	22	23	24	25	26	27	28
27	29	30

	July
Wk	Mo	Tu	We	Th	Fr	Sa	Su
27			01	02	03	04	05
28	06	07	08	09	10	11	12
29	13	14	15	16	17	18	19
30	20	21	22	23	24	25	26
31	27	28	29	30	31

	August
Wk	Mo	Tu	We	Th	Fr	Sa	Su
31						01	02
32	03	04	05	06	07	08	09
33	10	11	12	13	14	15	16
34	17	18	19	20	21	22	23
35	24	25	26	27	28	29	30
36	31

	September
Wk	Mo	Tu	We	Th	Fr	Sa	Su
36		01	02	03	04	05	06
37	07	08	09	10	11	12	13
38	14	15	16	17	18	19	20
39	21	22	23	24	25	26	27
40	28	29	30

	October
Wk	Mo	Tu	We	Th	Fr	Sa	Su
40				01	02	03	04
41	05	06	07	08	09	10	11
42	12	13	14	15	16	17	18
43	19	20	21	22	23	24	25
44	26	27	28	29	30	31

	November
Wk	Mo	Tu	We	Th	Fr	Sa	Su
44							01
45	02	03	04	05	06	07	08
46	09	10	11	12	13	14	15
47	16	17	18	19	20	21	22
48	23	24	25	26	27	28	29
49	30

	December
Wk	Mo	Tu	We	Th	Fr	Sa	Su
49		01	02	03	04	05	06
50	07	08	09	10	11	12	13
51	14	15	16	17	18	19	20
52	21	22	23	24	25	26	27
53	28	29	30	31

== Applicable years ==
=== Gregorian Calendar ===
Leap years that begin on Wednesday, along with those starting on Tuesday, occur at a rate of approximately 14.43% (14 out of 97) of all total leap years in a 400-year cycle of the Gregorian calendar. Thus, their overall occurrence is 3.5% (14 out of 400).

For this kind of year, the corresponding ISO year has 53 weeks.

Gregorian leap years starting on Wednesday
Decade	1st	2nd	3rd	4th	5th	6th	7th	8th	9th	10th
16th century	prior to first adoption (proleptic)									1592
17th century			1620		1648			1676		
18th century		1716			1744			1772		
19th century		1812		1840			1868			1896
20th century	1908			1936			1964			1992
21st century			2020		2048			2076		
22nd century		2116			2144			2172		
23rd century		2212		2240			2268			2296
24th century	2308			2336			2364			2392
25th century			2420		2448			2476		
26th century		2516			2544			2572		
27th century		2612		2640			2668			2696

400-year cycle
0–99	20	48	76	
100–199	116	144	172	
200–299	212	240	268	296
300–399	308	336	364	392

=== Julian Calendar ===
Like all leap year types, the one starting with 1 January on a Wednesday occurs exactly once in a 28-year cycle in the Julian calendar, i.e. in 3.57% of years. As the Julian calendar repeats after 28 years that means it will also repeat after 700 years, i.e. 25 cycles. The year's position in the cycle is given by the formula ((year + 8) mod 28) + 1).

Julian leap years starting on Wednesday
Decade	1st	2nd	3rd	4th	5th	6th	7th	8th	9th	10th
15th century		1416			1444			1472		1500
16th century			1528			1556			1584	
17th century		1612		1640			1668			1696
18th century			1724			1752		1780		
19th century	1808			1836			1864			1892
20th century		1920			1948			1976		
21st century	2004			2032		2060			2088	
22nd century		2116			2144			2172		2200

== Holidays ==
=== International ===
- Valentine's Day falls on a Friday
- The leap day (February 29) falls on a Saturday
- World Day for Grandparents and the Elderly falls on July 26
- Halloween falls on a Saturday
- Christmas Day falls on a Friday

=== Roman Catholic Solemnities ===
- Epiphany falls on a Monday
- Candlemas falls on a Sunday
- Saint Joseph's Day falls on a Thursday
- The Annunciation of Jesus falls on a Wednesday
- The Nativity of John the Baptist falls on a Wednesday
- The Solemnity of Saints Peter and Paul falls on a Monday
- The Transfiguration of Jesus falls on a Thursday
- The Assumption of Mary falls on a Saturday
- The Exaltation of the Holy Cross falls on a Monday
- All Saints' Day falls on a Sunday
- All Souls' Day falls on a Monday
- The Feast of Christ the King falls on November 22 (or on its earliest possible date of October 25 in versions of the calendar between 1925 and 1962)
- The First Sunday of Advent falls on November 29
- The Immaculate Conception falls on a Tuesday
- Gaudete Sunday falls on December 13
- Rorate Sunday falls on December 20

=== Australia and New Zealand ===
- Australia Day falls on a Sunday
- Waitangi Day falls on a Thursday
- Daylight saving ends on April 5
- ANZAC Day falls on a Saturday
- Mother's Day falls on May 10
- Father's Day falls on September 6
- Daylight saving begins on September 27 in New Zealand and October 4 in Australia

=== British Isles ===
- Saint David's Day falls on a Sunday
- Mother's Day falls on its earliest possible date of March 1, or on March 8, March 15, March 22 or March 29
- Saint Patrick's Day falls on a Tuesday
- Daylight saving begins on March 29
- Saint George's Day falls on a Thursday
- Father's Day falls on its latest possible date, June 21
- Orangeman's Day falls on a Sunday
- Daylight saving ends on its earliest possible date, October 25
- Guy Fawkes Night falls on a Thursday
- Saint Andrew's Day falls on a Monday

=== Canada ===
- Daylight saving begins on its earliest possible date, March 8
- Mother's Day falls on May 10
- Victoria Day falls on its earliest possible date, May 18
- Father's Day falls on its latest possible date, June 21. This is the only leap year when Victoria Day and Labour Day are 34 days apart. They are 27 days apart in all other leap years.
- Canada Day falls on a Wednesday
- Labour Day falls on its latest possible date, September 7 – this is the only leap year when Victoria Day and Labour Day are sixteen weeks apart (they are fifteen weeks apart in all other leap years)
- Thanksgiving Day falls on October 12
- Daylight saving ends on its earliest possible date, November 1 - This is the only leap year when Labour Day and the end of Daylight Saving Time are 55 days apart. They are 62 days apart in all other leap years

=== Denmark ===
- Constitution Day falls on a Friday

=== Germany ===
- Reunification falls on a Saturday

=== Italy ===
- Liberation Day falls on a Saturday

=== United States ===
- Martin Luther King Jr. Day falls on January 20
- President's Day falls on February 17
- Daylight saving begins on its earliest possible date, March 8
- Mother's Day falls on May 10
- Memorial Day falls on its earliest possible date, May 25
- Juneteenth falls on a Friday
- Father's Day falls on its latest possible date, June 21. This is the only leap year when Memorial Day and Father’s Day are 27 days apart. They are 20 days apart in all other leap years. This is also the only leap year when the start of Daylight Saving Time and Father’s Day are 15 weeks apart. They are 14 weeks apart in all other leap years
- Independence Day falls on a Saturday
- Labor Day falls on its latest possible date, September 7 – this is the only leap year when Memorial Day and Labor Day are fifteen weeks apart (they are fourteen weeks apart in all other leap years). This is the only leap year when the start of Daylight Saving Time and Labor Day are 183 days apart. They are 176 days apart in all other leap years.
- Grandparents' Day falls on its latest possible date, September 13. This is the only leap year when Memorial Day and Grandparent’s Day are 111 days apart. They are 104 days apart in all other leap years. This is also the only leap year when the start of Daylight Saving Time and Grandparent’s Day are 27 weeks apart. They are 26 weeks apart in all other leap years
- Columbus Day falls on October 12
- Daylight saving ends on its earliest possible date, November 1. This is the only leap year when Labor Day and the end of Daylight Saving Time are 55 days apart. They are 62 days apart in all other leap years. This is also the only leap year when Father’s Day and the end of Daylight Saving Time are 19 weeks apart. They are 20 weeks apart in all other leap years. This is also the only leap year when Grandparent’s Day and the end of Daylight Saving Time are 7 weeks apart. They are 8 weeks apart in all other leap years
- Election Day falls on November 3, its 2nd earliest election day, only surpassed by November 2.
- Thanksgiving Day falls on November 26
