= Leap year starting on Thursday =

A leap year starting on Thursday is any year with 366 days (i.e. it includes 29 February) that begins on Thursday 1 January, and ends on Friday 31 December. Its dominical letters hence are DC. The most recent year of such kind was 2004, and the next one will be 2032 in the Gregorian calendar or, likewise, 2016 and 2044 in the obsolete Julian calendar.

Any leap year that starts on Thursday has two Friday the 13ths: those two in this leap year occur in February and August.

== Calendars ==
Calendar for any leap year starting on Thursday,
presented as common in many English-speaking areas

	January
Su	Mo	Tu	We	Th	Fr	Sa
				1	2	3
4	5	6	7	8	9	10
11	12	13	14	15	16	17
18	19	20	21	22	23	24
25	26	27	28	29	30	31

	February
Su	Mo	Tu	We	Th	Fr	Sa
1	2	3	4	5	6	7
8	9	10	11	12	13	14
15	16	17	18	19	20	21
22	23	24	25	26	27	28
29

	March
Su	Mo	Tu	We	Th	Fr	Sa
	1	2	3	4	5	6
7	8	9	10	11	12	13
14	15	16	17	18	19	20
21	22	23	24	25	26	27
28	29	30	31

	April
Su	Mo	Tu	We	Th	Fr	Sa
				1	2	3
4	5	6	7	8	9	10
11	12	13	14	15	16	17
18	19	20	21	22	23	24
25	26	27	28	29	30

	May
Su	Mo	Tu	We	Th	Fr	Sa
						1
2	3	4	5	6	7	8
9	10	11	12	13	14	15
16	17	18	19	20	21	22
23	24	25	26	27	28	29
30	31

	June
Su	Mo	Tu	We	Th	Fr	Sa
		1	2	3	4	5
6	7	8	9	10	11	12
13	14	15	16	17	18	19
20	21	22	23	24	25	26
27	28	29	30

	July
Su	Mo	Tu	We	Th	Fr	Sa
				1	2	3
4	5	6	7	8	9	10
11	12	13	14	15	16	17
18	19	20	21	22	23	24
25	26	27	28	29	30	31

	August
Su	Mo	Tu	We	Th	Fr	Sa
1	2	3	4	5	6	7
8	9	10	11	12	13	14
15	16	17	18	19	20	21
22	23	24	25	26	27	28
29	30	31

	September
Su	Mo	Tu	We	Th	Fr	Sa
			1	2	3	4
5	6	7	8	9	10	11
12	13	14	15	16	17	18
19	20	21	22	23	24	25
26	27	28	29	30

	October
Su	Mo	Tu	We	Th	Fr	Sa
					1	2
3	4	5	6	7	8	9
10	11	12	13	14	15	16
17	18	19	20	21	22	23
24	25	26	27	28	29	30
31

	November
Su	Mo	Tu	We	Th	Fr	Sa
	1	2	3	4	5	6
7	8	9	10	11	12	13
14	15	16	17	18	19	20
21	22	23	24	25	26	27
28	29	30

	December
Su	Mo	Tu	We	Th	Fr	Sa
			1	2	3	4
5	6	7	8	9	10	11
12	13	14	15	16	17	18
19	20	21	22	23	24	25
26	27	28	29	30	31

ISO 8601-conformant calendar with week numbers for
any leap year starting on Thursday (dominical letter DC)

	January
Wk	Mo	Tu	We	Th	Fr	Sa	Su
01				01	02	03	04
02	05	06	07	08	09	10	11
03	12	13	14	15	16	17	18
04	19	20	21	22	23	24	25
05	26	27	28	29	30	31

	February
Wk	Mo	Tu	We	Th	Fr	Sa	Su
05							01
06	02	03	04	05	06	07	08
07	09	10	11	12	13	14	15
08	16	17	18	19	20	21	22
09	23	24	25	26	27	28	29

	March
Wk	Mo	Tu	We	Th	Fr	Sa	Su
10	01	02	03	04	05	06	07
11	08	09	10	11	12	13	14
12	15	16	17	18	19	20	21
13	22	23	24	25	26	27	28
14	29	30	31

	April
Wk	Mo	Tu	We	Th	Fr	Sa	Su
14				01	02	03	04
15	05	06	07	08	09	10	11
16	12	13	14	15	16	17	18
17	19	20	21	22	23	24	25
18	26	27	28	29	30

	May
Wk	Mo	Tu	We	Th	Fr	Sa	Su
18						01	02
19	03	04	05	06	07	08	09
20	10	11	12	13	14	15	16
21	17	18	19	20	21	22	23
22	24	25	26	27	28	29	30
23	31

	June
Wk	Mo	Tu	We	Th	Fr	Sa	Su
23		01	02	03	04	05	06
24	07	08	09	10	11	12	13
25	14	15	16	17	18	19	20
26	21	22	23	24	25	26	27
27	28	29	30

	July
Wk	Mo	Tu	We	Th	Fr	Sa	Su
27				01	02	03	04
28	05	06	07	08	09	10	11
29	12	13	14	15	16	17	18
30	19	20	21	22	23	24	25
31	26	27	28	29	30	31

	August
Wk	Mo	Tu	We	Th	Fr	Sa	Su
31							01
32	02	03	04	05	06	07	08
33	09	10	11	12	13	14	15
34	16	17	18	19	20	21	22
35	23	24	25	26	27	28	29
36	30	31

	September
Wk	Mo	Tu	We	Th	Fr	Sa	Su
36			01	02	03	04	05
37	06	07	08	09	10	11	12
38	13	14	15	16	17	18	19
39	20	21	22	23	24	25	26
40	27	28	29	30

	October
Wk	Mo	Tu	We	Th	Fr	Sa	Su
40					01	02	03
41	04	05	06	07	08	09	10
42	11	12	13	14	15	16	17
43	18	19	20	21	22	23	24
44	25	26	27	28	29	30	31

	November
Wk	Mo	Tu	We	Th	Fr	Sa	Su
45	01	02	03	04	05	06	07
46	08	09	10	11	12	13	14
47	15	16	17	18	19	20	21
48	22	23	24	25	26	27	28
49	29	30

	December
Wk	Mo	Tu	We	Th	Fr	Sa	Su
49			01	02	03	04	05
50	06	07	08	09	10	11	12
51	13	14	15	16	17	18	19
52	20	21	22	23	24	25	26
53	27	28	29	30	31

== Applicable years ==
=== Gregorian Calendar ===
Leap years that begin on Thursday, along with those starting on Monday and Saturday, occur least frequently: 13 out of 97 (≈ 13.402%) total leap years in a 400-year cycle of the Gregorian calendar. Their overall occurrence is thus 3.25% (13 out of 400).

For this kind of year, the corresponding ISO year has 53 weeks, and the ISO week 10 (which begins March 1) and all subsequent ISO weeks occur earlier than in all other years, and exactly one week earlier than common years starting on Friday, for example, June 20 falls on week 24 in common years starting on Friday, but on week 25 in leap years starting on Thursday, despite falling on Sunday in both types of year. That means that moveable holidays may occur one calendar week later than otherwise possible, e.g. Gregorian Easter Sunday in week 17 in years when it falls on April 25 and which are also leap years, falling on week 16 in common years.

Gregorian leap years starting on Thursday
Decade	1st	2nd	3rd	4th	5th	6th	7th	8th	9th	10th
17th century	1604			1632		1660			1688	
18th century			1728			1756			1784	
19th century			1824			1852			1880	
20th century		1920			1948			1976		
21st century	2004			2032			2060		2088	
22nd century			2128			2156			2184	
23rd century			2224			2252			2280	
24th century		2320			2348			2376		
25th century	2404			2432			2460		2488	
26th century			2528			2556			2584	
27th century			2624			2652		2680		

400-year cycle
0–99	4	32	60	88
100–199	128	156	184	
200–299	224	252	280	
300–399	320	348	376	

=== Julian Calendar ===
Like all leap year types, the one starting with 1 January on a Thursday occurs exactly once in a 28-year cycle in the Julian calendar, i.e. in 3.57% of years. As the Julian calendar repeats after 28 years that means it will also repeat after 700 years, i.e. 25 cycles. The year's position in the cycle is given by the formula (((year + 8) mod 28) + 1).

Julian leap years starting on Thursday
Decade	1st	2nd	3rd	4th	5th	6th	7th	8th	9th	10th
15th century			1428			1456			1484	
16th century		1512		1540			1568			1596
17th century			1624			1652		1680		
18th century	1708			1736			1764			1792
19th century		1820			1848			1876		
20th century	1904			1932		1960			1988	
21st century		2016			2044			2072		2100
22nd century			2128			2156			2184	

== Holidays ==
=== International ===
- Valentine's Day falls on a Saturday
- The leap day (February 29) falls on a Sunday
- World Day for Grandparents and the Elderly falls on July 25
- Halloween falls on a Sunday
- Christmas Day falls on a Saturday

=== Roman Catholic Solemnities ===
- Epiphany falls on a Tuesday
- Candlemas falls on a Monday
- Saint Joseph's Day falls on a Friday
- The Annunciation of Jesus falls on a Thursday
- The Nativity of John the Baptist falls on a Thursday
- The Solemnity of Saints Peter and Paul falls on a Tuesday
- The Transfiguration of Jesus falls on a Friday
- The Assumption of Mary falls on a Sunday
- The Exaltation of the Holy Cross falls on a Tuesday
- All Saints' Day falls on a Monday. This is the only year when All Saints Day falls in ISO week 45. They fall in ISO week 44 in all other years.
- All Souls' Day falls on a Tuesday
- The Feast of Christ the King falls on November 21 (or on its latest possible date of October 31 in versions of the calendar between 1925 and 1962)
- The First Sunday of Advent falls on November 28
- The Immaculate Conception falls on a Wednesday
- Gaudete Sunday falls on December 12
- Rorate Sunday falls on December 19

=== Australia and New Zealand ===
- Australia Day falls on a Monday
- Waitangi Day falls on a Friday
- Daylight saving ends on April 4
- ANZAC Day falls on a Sunday, and in some years coincides with Easter Sunday falling on its latest possible date
- Mother's Day falls on May 9
- Father's Day falls on September 5
- Daylight saving begins on September 26 in New Zealand and October 3 in Australia

=== British Isles ===
- Saint David's Day falls on a Monday. This is the only year when Saint David's Day falls in ISO week 10. They fall in ISO week 9 in all other years
- Mother's Day falls on March 7, March 14, March 21, March 28 or on its latest possible date of April 4
- Daylight saving begins on March 28
- Saint Patrick's Day falls on a Wednesday
- Saint George's Day falls on a Friday, and in some years coincides with Good Friday falling on its latest possible date
- Father's Day falls on June 20
- Orangeman's Day falls on a Monday. This is the only year when Orangeman's Day falls in ISO week 29. They fall in ISO week 28 in all other years
- Daylight saving ends on its latest possible date, October 31. This is the only year when Daylight Saving Time ends in ISO week 44. They end in ISO week 43 in all other years
- Guy Fawkes Night falls on a Friday
- Saint Andrew's Day falls on a Tuesday

=== Canada ===
- Daylight saving begins on its latest possible date, March 14. This is the only year when Daylight Saving Time begins in ISO week 11. They begin in ISO week 10 in all other years.
- Mother's Day falls on May 9
- Victoria Day falls on its latest possible date, May 24. This is the only year when Victoria Day falls in ISO week 22. They fall in ISO week 21 in all other years. This is also the only year when Labour Day that precedes this type of year to Victoria Day in this type of year are 38 weeks apart. They are 37 weeks apart in all other years. This is also the only year when Father's Day that precedes this type of year to Victoria Day in this type of year are 344 days apart. They are 337 days apart in all other years.
- Father's Day falls on June 20
- Canada Day falls on a Thursday
- Labour Day falls on September 6
- Thanksgiving Day falls on October 11
- Daylight saving ends on its latest possible date, November 7. This is the only year when Daylight Saving Time ends in ISO week 45. They end in ISO week 44 in all other years.

=== Denmark ===
- The Constitution Day falls on a Saturday

=== Germany ===
- The reunification falls on a Sunday

=== United States ===
- Martin Luther King Jr. Day falls on January 19
- President's Day falls on February 16
- Daylight saving begins on its latest possible date, March 14. This is the only year when Daylight Saving Time begins in ISO week 11. They begin in ISO week 10 in all other years. This is also the only type of year where Labor Day that precedes this type of year to start of Daylight Saving Time is 195 days apart. They are 188 days apart in all other years. This is also the only type of year where Grandparent's Day that precedes this type of year to start of Daylight Saving Time is 27 weeks apart. They are 26 weeks apart in all other years. This is also the only type of year where Father's Day that precedes this type of year to start of Daylight Saving Time is 39 weeks apart. They are 38 weeks apart in all other years.
- Mother's Day falls on May 9
- Memorial Day falls on its latest possible date, May 31. This is the only year when Memorial Day falls in ISO week 23. They fall in ISO week 22 in all other years. This is also the only type of year where Labor Day that precedes this type of year to Memorial Day in this type of year are 39 weeks apart. They are 38 weeks apart in all other years. This is also the only type of year where Grandparent's Day that precedes this type of year to Memorial Day in this type of year are 267 days apart. They are 260 days apart in all other years. This is also the only type of year where Father's Day that precedes this type of year to Memorial Day in this type of year is 351 days apart. They are 344 days apart in all other years.
- Juneteenth falls on a Saturday
- Father's Day falls on June 20
- Independence Day falls on a Sunday
- Labor Day falls on September 6
- Grandparents' Day falls on September 12
- Columbus Day falls on October 11
- Election Day falls on its earliest possible date, November 2. This is the only leap year to have Election Day fall during Daylight Saving Time.
- Daylight saving ends on its latest possible date, November 7. This is the only year when Daylight Saving Time ends in ISO week 45. They end in ISO week 44 in all other years
- Thanksgiving Day falls on November 25
