= Leap year starting on Saturday =

A leap year starting on Saturday is any year with 366 days (i.e. it includes 29 February) that begins on Saturday, 1 January, and ends on Sunday, 31 December. Its dominical letters hence are BA. The most recent year of such kind was 2000, and the next one will be 2028 in the Gregorian calendar or, likewise 2012 and 2040 in the obsolete Julian calendar. In the Gregorian calendar, years divisible by 400 are always leap years starting on Saturday. The most recent such occurrence was 2000 and the next one will be 2400, see below for more.

Any leap year that starts on Saturday has only one Friday the 13th: the only one in this leap year occurs in October. Common years starting on Sunday share this characteristic, but also have another in January. From August of the common year preceding that year until October in this type of year is also the longest period (14 months) that occurs without a Friday the 13th. Common years starting on Tuesday share this characteristic, from July of the year that precedes it to September in that type of year.

== Calendars ==
Calendar for any leap year starting on Saturday,
presented as common in many English-speaking areas

	January
Su	Mo	Tu	We	Th	Fr	Sa
						1
2	3	4	5	6	7	8
9	10	11	12	13	14	15
16	17	18	19	20	21	22
23	24	25	26	27	28	29
30	31

	February
Su	Mo	Tu	We	Th	Fr	Sa
		1	2	3	4	5
6	7	8	9	10	11	12
13	14	15	16	17	18	19
20	21	22	23	24	25	26
27	28	29

	March
Su	Mo	Tu	We	Th	Fr	Sa
			1	2	3	4
5	6	7	8	9	10	11
12	13	14	15	16	17	18
19	20	21	22	23	24	25
26	27	28	29	30	31

	April
Su	Mo	Tu	We	Th	Fr	Sa
						1
2	3	4	5	6	7	8
9	10	11	12	13	14	15
16	17	18	19	20	21	22
23	24	25	26	27	28	29
30

	May
Su	Mo	Tu	We	Th	Fr	Sa
	1	2	3	4	5	6
7	8	9	10	11	12	13
14	15	16	17	18	19	20
21	22	23	24	25	26	27
28	29	30	31

	June
Su	Mo	Tu	We	Th	Fr	Sa
				1	2	3
4	5	6	7	8	9	10
11	12	13	14	15	16	17
18	19	20	21	22	23	24
25	26	27	28	29	30

	July
Su	Mo	Tu	We	Th	Fr	Sa
						1
2	3	4	5	6	7	8
9	10	11	12	13	14	15
16	17	18	19	20	21	22
23	24	25	26	27	28	29
30	31

	August
Su	Mo	Tu	We	Th	Fr	Sa
		1	2	3	4	5
6	7	8	9	10	11	12
13	14	15	16	17	18	19
20	21	22	23	24	25	26
27	28	29	30	31

	September
Su	Mo	Tu	We	Th	Fr	Sa
					1	2
3	4	5	6	7	8	9
10	11	12	13	14	15	16
17	18	19	20	21	22	23
24	25	26	27	28	29	30

	October
Su	Mo	Tu	We	Th	Fr	Sa
1	2	3	4	5	6	7
8	9	10	11	12	13	14
15	16	17	18	19	20	21
22	23	24	25	26	27	28
29	30	31

	November
Su	Mo	Tu	We	Th	Fr	Sa
			1	2	3	4
5	6	7	8	9	10	11
12	13	14	15	16	17	18
19	20	21	22	23	24	25
26	27	28	29	30

	December
Su	Mo	Tu	We	Th	Fr	Sa
					1	2
3	4	5	6	7	8	9
10	11	12	13	14	15	16
17	18	19	20	21	22	23
24	25	26	27	28	29	30
31

ISO 8601-conformant calendar with week numbers for
any leap year starting on Saturday (dominical letter BA)

	January
Wk	Mo	Tu	We	Th	Fr	Sa	Su
52						01	02
01	03	04	05	06	07	08	09
02	10	11	12	13	14	15	16
03	17	18	19	20	21	22	23
04	24	25	26	27	28	29	30
05	31

	February
Wk	Mo	Tu	We	Th	Fr	Sa	Su
05		01	02	03	04	05	06
06	07	08	09	10	11	12	13
07	14	15	16	17	18	19	20
08	21	22	23	24	25	26	27
09	28	29

	March
Wk	Mo	Tu	We	Th	Fr	Sa	Su
09			01	02	03	04	05
10	06	07	08	09	10	11	12
11	13	14	15	16	17	18	19
12	20	21	22	23	24	25	26
13	27	28	29	30	31

	April
Wk	Mo	Tu	We	Th	Fr	Sa	Su
13						01	02
14	03	04	05	06	07	08	09
15	10	11	12	13	14	15	16
16	17	18	19	20	21	22	23
17	24	25	26	27	28	29	30

	May
Wk	Mo	Tu	We	Th	Fr	Sa	Su
18	01	02	03	04	05	06	07
19	08	09	10	11	12	13	14
20	15	16	17	18	19	20	21
21	22	23	24	25	26	27	28
22	29	30	31

	June
Wk	Mo	Tu	We	Th	Fr	Sa	Su
22				01	02	03	04
23	05	06	07	08	09	10	11
24	12	13	14	15	16	17	18
25	19	20	21	22	23	24	25
26	26	27	28	29	30

	July
Wk	Mo	Tu	We	Th	Fr	Sa	Su
26						01	02
27	03	04	05	06	07	08	09
28	10	11	12	13	14	15	16
29	17	18	19	20	21	22	23
30	24	25	26	27	28	29	30
31	31

	August
Wk	Mo	Tu	We	Th	Fr	Sa	Su
31		01	02	03	04	05	06
32	07	08	09	10	11	12	13
33	14	15	16	17	18	19	20
34	21	22	23	24	25	26	27
35	28	29	30	31

	September
Wk	Mo	Tu	We	Th	Fr	Sa	Su
35					01	02	03
36	04	05	06	07	08	09	10
37	11	12	13	14	15	16	17
38	18	19	20	21	22	23	24
39	25	26	27	28	29	30

	October
Wk	Mo	Tu	We	Th	Fr	Sa	Su
39							01
40	02	03	04	05	06	07	08
41	09	10	11	12	13	14	15
42	16	17	18	19	20	21	22
43	23	24	25	26	27	28	29
44	30	31

	November
Wk	Mo	Tu	We	Th	Fr	Sa	Su
44			01	02	03	04	05
45	06	07	08	09	10	11	12
46	13	14	15	16	17	18	19
47	20	21	22	23	24	25	26
48	27	28	29	30

	December
Wk	Mo	Tu	We	Th	Fr	Sa	Su
48					01	02	03
49	04	05	06	07	08	09	10
50	11	12	13	14	15	16	17
51	18	19	20	21	22	23	24
52	25	26	27	28	29	30	31

== Applicable years ==
=== Gregorian Calendar ===
Leap years that begin on Saturday, along with those starting on Monday and Thursday, occur least frequently: 13 out of 97 (≈ 13.402%) total leap years in a 400-year cycle of the Gregorian calendar. Their overall occurrence is thus 3.25% (13 out of 400).

Gregorian leap years starting on Saturday
Decade	1st	2nd	3rd	4th	5th	6th	7th	8th	9th	10th
16th century	prior to first adoption (proleptic)									1600
17th century			1628			1656			1684	
18th century			1724			1752		1780		
19th century			1820		1848			1876		
20th century		1916			1944			1972		2000
21st century			2028			2056			2084	
22nd century			2124			2152		2180		
23rd century			2220		2248			2276		
24th century		2316			2344			2372		2400
25th century			2428			2456			2484	

400-year cycle
0–99	0	28	56	84
100–199	124	152	180	
200–299	220	248	276	
300–399	316	344	372	

=== Julian Calendar ===
Like all leap year types, the one starting with 1 January on a Saturday occurs exactly once in a 28-year cycle in the Julian calendar, i.e. in 3.57% of years. As the Julian calendar repeats after 28 years that means it will also repeat after 700 years, i.e. 25 cycles. The year's position in the cycle is given by the formula ((year + 8) mod 28) + 1).

Julian leap years starting on Saturday
Decade	1st	2nd	3rd	4th	5th	6th	7th	8th	9th	10th
15th century			1424			1452		1480		
16th century	1508			1536			1564			1592
17th century		1620			1648			1676		
18th century	1704			1732		1760			1788	
19th century		1816			1844			1872		1900
20th century			1928			1956			1984	
21st century		2012		2040			2068			2096
22nd century			2124			2152		2180		

== Holidays ==
=== International ===
- Valentine's Day falls on a Monday
- The leap day (February 29) falls on a Tuesday
- World Day for Grandparents and the Elderly falls on July 23
- Halloween falls on a Tuesday
- Christmas Day falls on a Monday

=== Roman Catholic Solemnities ===
- Epiphany falls on a Thursday
- Candlemas falls on a Wednesday
- Saint Joseph's Day falls on a Sunday
- The Annunciation of Jesus falls on a Saturday
- The Nativity of John the Baptist falls on a Saturday
- The Solemnity of Saints Peter and Paul falls on a Thursday
- The Transfiguration of Jesus falls on a Sunday
- The Assumption of Mary falls on a Tuesday
- The Exaltation of the Holy Cross falls on a Thursday
- All Saints' Day falls on a Wednesday
- All Souls' Day falls on a Thursday
- The Feast of Christ the King falls on its latest possible date, November 26 (or on October 29 in versions of the calendar between 1925 and 1962)
- The First Sunday of Advent falls on its latest possible date, December 3
- The Immaculate Conception falls on a Friday
- Gaudete Sunday falls on its latest possible date, December 17
- Rorate Sunday falls on its latest possible date, December 24

=== Australia and New Zealand ===
- Australia Day falls on a Wednesday
- Waitangi Day falls on a Sunday
- Daylight saving ends on April 2
- ANZAC Day falls on a Tuesday
- Mother's Day falls on its latest possible date, May 14
- Father's Day falls on September 3
- Daylight saving begins on its earliest possible date, September 24 in New Zealand and October 1 in Australia

=== British Isles ===
- Saint David's Day falls on a Wednesday
- Mother's Day falls on March 5, March 12, March 19, March 26 or April 2
- Daylight saving begins on March 26
- Saint Patrick's Day falls on a Friday
- Saint George's Day falls on a Sunday
- Father's Day falls on June 18
- Orangeman's Day falls on a Wednesday
- Daylight saving ends on October 29
- Guy Fawkes Night falls on a Sunday
- Saint Andrew's Day falls on a Thursday

=== Canada ===
- Daylight saving begins on March 12
- Mother's Day falls on its latest possible date, May 14
- Victoria Day falls on May 22
- Father's Day falls on June 18
- Canada Day falls on a Saturday
- Labour Day falls on September 4
- Thanksgiving Day falls on October 9
- Daylight saving ends on November 5

=== Denmark ===
- The Constitution Day falls on a Monday

=== Germany ===
- The reunification falls on a Tuesday

=== United States ===
- Martin Luther King Jr. Day falls on January 17
- President's Day falls on its latest possible date, February 21
- Daylight saving begins on March 12
- Mother's Day falls on its latest possible date, May 14
- Memorial Day falls on May 29
- Father's Day falls on June 18
- Juneteenth falls on a Monday
- Independence Day falls on a Tuesday
- Labor Day falls on September 4
- Grandparents' Day falls on September 10
- Columbus Day falls on October 9
- Daylight saving ends on November 5
- Election Day falls on November 7
- Thanksgiving Day falls on November 23
