= Leap year starting on Monday =

A leap year starting on Monday is any year with 366 days (i.e. it includes 29 February) that begins on Monday, 1 January, and ends on Tuesday, 31 December. Its dominical letters hence are GF. The most recent year of such kind was 2024, and the next one will be 2052 in the Gregorian calendar or, likewise, 2008 and 2036 in the obsolete Julian calendar.

Any leap year that starts on Monday has two Friday the 13ths: those two in this leap year occur in September and December. Common years starting on Tuesday share this characteristic.

== Calendars ==
Calendar for any leap year starting on Monday,
presented as common in many English-speaking areas

	January
Su	Mo	Tu	We	Th	Fr	Sa
	1	2	3	4	5	6
7	8	9	10	11	12	13
14	15	16	17	18	19	20
21	22	23	24	25	26	27
28	29	30	31

	February
Su	Mo	Tu	We	Th	Fr	Sa
				1	2	3
4	5	6	7	8	9	10
11	12	13	14	15	16	17
18	19	20	21	22	23	24
25	26	27	28	29

	March
Su	Mo	Tu	We	Th	Fr	Sa
					1	2
3	4	5	6	7	8	9
10	11	12	13	14	15	16
17	18	19	20	21	22	23
24	25	26	27	28	29	30
31

	April
Su	Mo	Tu	We	Th	Fr	Sa
	1	2	3	4	5	6
7	8	9	10	11	12	13
14	15	16	17	18	19	20
21	22	23	24	25	26	27
28	29	30

	May
Su	Mo	Tu	We	Th	Fr	Sa
			1	2	3	4
5	6	7	8	9	10	11
12	13	14	15	16	17	18
19	20	21	22	23	24	25
26	27	28	29	30	31

	June
Su	Mo	Tu	We	Th	Fr	Sa
						1
2	3	4	5	6	7	8
9	10	11	12	13	14	15
16	17	18	19	20	21	22
23	24	25	26	27	28	29
30

	July
Su	Mo	Tu	We	Th	Fr	Sa
	1	2	3	4	5	6
7	8	9	10	11	12	13
14	15	16	17	18	19	20
21	22	23	24	25	26	27
28	29	30	31

	August
Su	Mo	Tu	We	Th	Fr	Sa
				1	2	3
4	5	6	7	8	9	10
11	12	13	14	15	16	17
18	19	20	21	22	23	24
25	26	27	28	29	30	31

	September
Su	Mo	Tu	We	Th	Fr	Sa
1	2	3	4	5	6	7
8	9	10	11	12	13	14
15	16	17	18	19	20	21
22	23	24	25	26	27	28
29	30

	October
Su	Mo	Tu	We	Th	Fr	Sa
		1	2	3	4	5
6	7	8	9	10	11	12
13	14	15	16	17	18	19
20	21	22	23	24	25	26
27	28	29	30	31

	November
Su	Mo	Tu	We	Th	Fr	Sa
					1	2
3	4	5	6	7	8	9
10	11	12	13	14	15	16
17	18	19	20	21	22	23
24	25	26	27	28	29	30

	December
Su	Mo	Tu	We	Th	Fr	Sa
1	2	3	4	5	6	7
8	9	10	11	12	13	14
15	16	17	18	19	20	21
22	23	24	25	26	27	28
29	30	31

ISO 8601-conformant calendar with week numbers for
any leap year starting on Monday (dominical letter GF)

	January
Wk	Mo	Tu	We	Th	Fr	Sa	Su
01	01	02	03	04	05	06	07
02	08	09	10	11	12	13	14
03	15	16	17	18	19	20	21
04	22	23	24	25	26	27	28
05	29	30	31

	February
Wk	Mo	Tu	We	Th	Fr	Sa	Su
05				01	02	03	04
06	05	06	07	08	09	10	11
07	12	13	14	15	16	17	18
08	19	20	21	22	23	24	25
09	26	27	28	29

	March
Wk	Mo	Tu	We	Th	Fr	Sa	Su
09					01	02	03
10	04	05	06	07	08	09	10
11	11	12	13	14	15	16	17
12	18	19	20	21	22	23	24
13	25	26	27	28	29	30	31

	April
Wk	Mo	Tu	We	Th	Fr	Sa	Su
14	01	02	03	04	05	06	07
15	08	09	10	11	12	13	14
16	15	16	17	18	19	20	21
17	22	23	24	25	26	27	28
18	29	30

	May
Wk	Mo	Tu	We	Th	Fr	Sa	Su
18			01	02	03	04	05
19	06	07	08	09	10	11	12
20	13	14	15	16	17	18	19
21	20	21	22	23	24	25	26
22	27	28	29	30	31

	June
Wk	Mo	Tu	We	Th	Fr	Sa	Su
22						01	02
23	03	04	05	06	07	08	09
24	10	11	12	13	14	15	16
25	17	18	19	20	21	22	23
26	24	25	26	27	28	29	30

	July
Wk	Mo	Tu	We	Th	Fr	Sa	Su
27	01	02	03	04	05	06	07
28	08	09	10	11	12	13	14
29	15	16	17	18	19	20	21
30	22	23	24	25	26	27	28
31	29	30	31

	August
Wk	Mo	Tu	We	Th	Fr	Sa	Su
31				01	02	03	04
32	05	06	07	08	09	10	11
33	12	13	14	15	16	17	18
34	19	20	21	22	23	24	25
35	26	27	28	29	30	31

	September
Wk	Mo	Tu	We	Th	Fr	Sa	Su
35							01
36	02	03	04	05	06	07	08
37	09	10	11	12	13	14	15
38	16	17	18	19	20	21	22
39	23	24	25	26	27	28	29
40	30

	October
Wk	Mo	Tu	We	Th	Fr	Sa	Su
40		01	02	03	04	05	06
41	07	08	09	10	11	12	13
42	14	15	16	17	18	19	20
43	21	22	23	24	25	26	27
44	28	29	30	31

	November
Wk	Mo	Tu	We	Th	Fr	Sa	Su
44					01	02	03
45	04	05	06	07	08	09	10
46	11	12	13	14	15	16	17
47	18	19	20	21	22	23	24
48	25	26	27	28	29	30

	December
Wk	Mo	Tu	We	Th	Fr	Sa	Su
48							01
49	02	03	04	05	06	07	08
50	09	10	11	12	13	14	15
51	16	17	18	19	20	21	22
52	23	24	25	26	27	28	29
01	30	31

== Applicable years ==
=== Gregorian Calendar ===
Leap years that begin on Monday, along with those starting on Saturday and Thursday, occur least frequently: 13 out of 97 (≈ 13.4%) total leap years in a 400-year cycle of the Gregorian calendar. Their overall frequency is thus 3.25% (13 out of 400) of years.

Gregorian leap years starting on Monday
Decade	1st	2nd	3rd	4th	5th	6th	7th	8th	9th	10th
16th century	prior to first adoption (proleptic)									1596
17th century			1624			1652			1680	
18th century		1720			1748			1776		
19th century		1816			1844			1872		
20th century		1912			1940		1968			1996
21st century			2024			2052			2080	
22nd century			2120		2148			2176		
23rd century		2216			2244			2272		
24th century		2312			2340		2368			2396
25th century			2424			2452			2480	
26th century		2520			2548			2576		
27th century		2616			2644			2672		

400-year cycle
0–99	24	52	80	
100–199	120	148	176	
200–299	216	244	272	
300–399	312	340	368	396

=== Julian Calendar ===
Like all leap year types, the one starting with 1 January on a Monday occurs exactly once in a 28-year cycle in the Julian calendar, i.e. in 3.57% of years. As the Julian calendar repeats after 28 years that means it will also repeat after 700 years, i.e. 25 cycles. The year's position in the cycle is given by the formula ((year + 8) mod 28) + 1).

Julian leap years starting on Monday
Decade	1st	2nd	3rd	4th	5th	6th	7th	8th	9th	10th
14th century	1308			1336			1364			1392
15th century		1420			1448			1476		
16th century	1504			1532		1560			1588	
17th century		1616			1644			1672		1700
18th century			1728			1756			1784	
19th century		1812		1840			1868			1896
20th century			1924			1952		1980		
21st century	2008			2036			2064			2092
22nd century		2120			2148			2176		

== Holidays ==
=== International ===
- Valentine's Day falls on a Wednesday
- The leap day (February 29) falls on a Thursday
- World Day for Grandparents and the Elderly falls on its latest possible date, July 28
- Halloween falls on a Thursday
- Christmas Day falls on a Wednesday

=== Roman Catholic Solemnities ===
- Epiphany falls on a Saturday or, in places when it is transferred to a Sunday, January 7
- Candlemas falls on a Friday
- Saint Joseph's Day falls on a Tuesday
- The Annunciation of Jesus falls on a Monday
- The Nativity of John the Baptist falls on a Monday
- The Solemnity of Saints Peter and Paul falls on a Saturday
- The Transfiguration of Jesus falls on a Tuesday
- The Assumption of Mary falls on a Thursday
- The Exaltation of the Holy Cross falls on a Saturday
- All Saints' Day falls on a Friday
- All Souls' Day falls on a Saturday
- The Feast of Christ the King falls on November 24 (or on October 27 in versions of the calendar between 1925 and 1962)
- The First Sunday of Advent falls on December 1
- The Immaculate Conception falls on a Sunday, thus transferred to Monday, December 9.
- Gaudete Sunday falls on December 15
- Rorate Sunday falls on December 22

=== Australia and New Zealand ===
- Australia Day falls on a Friday
- Waitangi Day falls on a Tuesday
- Daylight saving ends on its latest possible date, April 7 – the period of daylight saving which ends on April 7 of a leap year starting on Monday is the only period ending in any year to last 27 weeks in Australia and 28 weeks in New Zealand; in all other instances, the period of daylight saving lasts only 26 weeks in Australia and 27 weeks in New Zealand
- ANZAC Day falls on a Thursday
- Mother's Day falls on May 12
- Father's Day falls on its earliest possible date, September 1
- Daylight saving begins on September 29 in New Zealand and October 6 in Australia

=== British Isles ===
- Saint David's Day falls on a Friday
- Mother's Day falls on March 3, March 10, March 17, March 24 or March 31
- Saint Patrick's Day falls on a Sunday
- Daylight saving begins on its latest possible date, March 31
- Saint George's Day falls on a Tuesday
- Father's Day falls on June 16
- Orangeman's Day falls on a Friday
- Daylight saving ends on October 27
- Guy Fawkes Night falls on a Tuesday
- Saint Andrew's Day falls on a Saturday

=== Canada ===
- Daylight saving begins on March 10
- Mother's Day falls on May 12
- Victoria Day falls on May 20
- Father's Day falls on June 16
- Canada Day falls on a Monday
- Labour Day falls on September 2
- Thanksgiving Day falls on its latest possible date, October 14
- Daylight saving ends on November 3

=== Denmark ===
- The Constitution Day falls on a Wednesday

=== Germany ===
- The reunification falls on a Thursday

=== United States ===
- Martin Luther King Jr. Day falls on its earliest possible date, January 15
- President's Day falls on February 19
- Daylight saving begins on March 10
- Mother's Day falls on May 12
- Memorial Day falls on May 27
- Father's Day falls on June 16
- Juneteenth falls on a Wednesday
- Independence Day falls on a Thursday
- Labor Day falls on September 2
- Grandparents' Day falls on September 8
- Columbus Day falls on its latest possible date, October 14 (this is the only year when Martin Luther King Jr. Day and Columbus Day are 39 weeks apart). They are 38 weeks apart in all other years
- Daylight saving ends on November 3
- Election Day falls on November 5
- Thanksgiving Day falls on its latest possible date, November 28 (this is also the only year when Martin Luther King Jr. Day and Thanksgiving are 318 days apart). They are 311 days apart in all other years
