= Friday the 13th =

Unlucky day in popular superstition

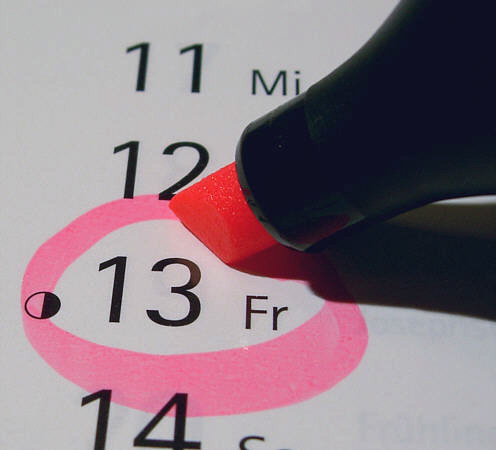
Friday the 13th marked on a calendar

Friday the 13th is considered an unlucky day in Western superstition. It occurs when the 13th day of the month in the Gregorian calendar falls on a Friday, which happens at least once every year but can occur up to three times in the same year. For the 13th to fall on Friday, a month's first day must be a Sunday.

== Origins ==
=== Unluckiness of 13 ===
One source mentioned for the unlucky reputation of the number 13 is a Norse myth about twelve gods having a dinner party in Valhalla. The trickster god Loki, who was not invited, arrived as the thirteenth guest, and arranged for Höðr, the god of darkness, to shoot Balder, the god of joy and gladness, with a mistletoe-tipped arrow. Balder died, triggering much suffering in the world, which caused the number 13 to be considered unlucky.

==== Christian associations ====
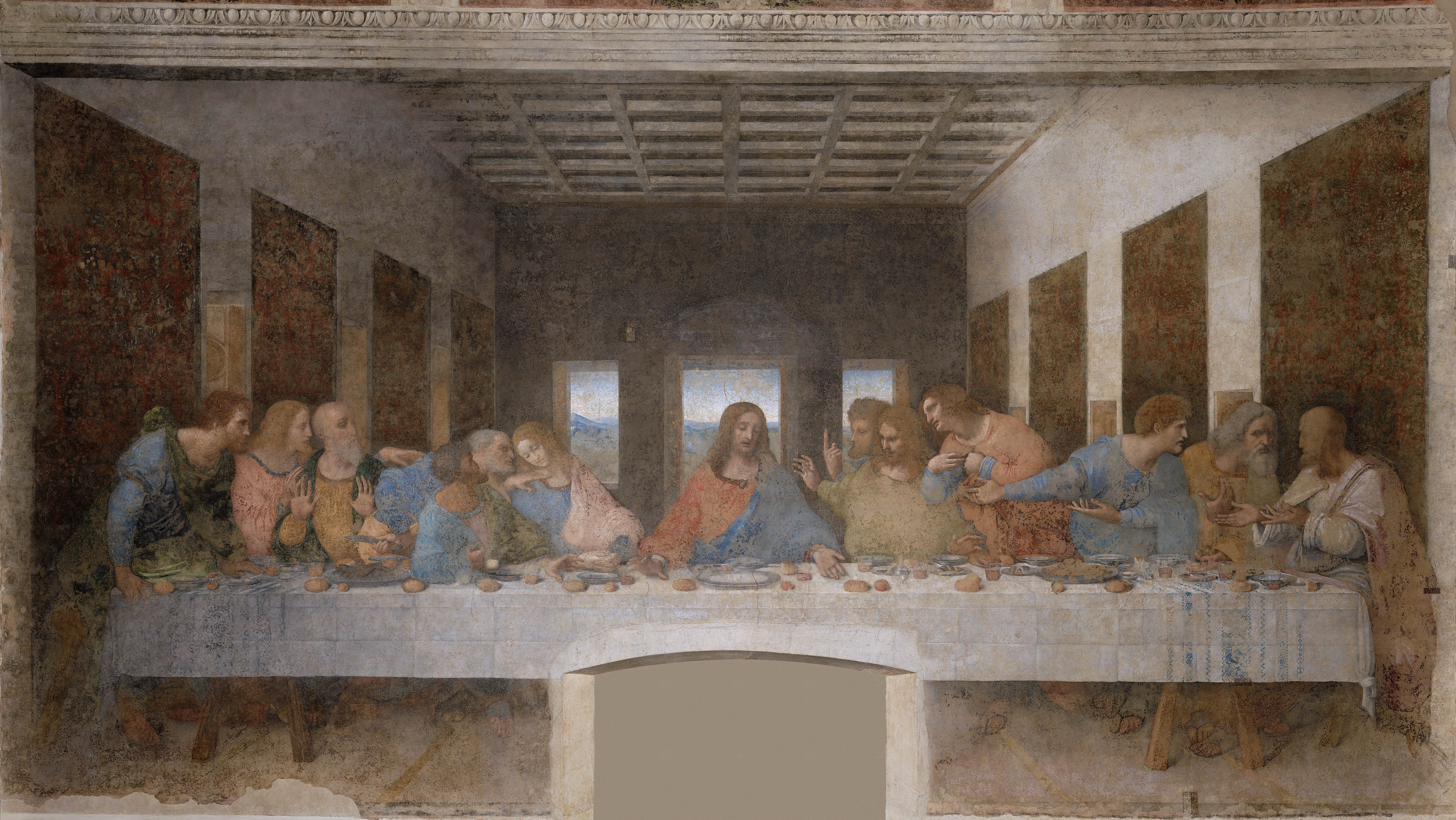
The Last Supper by Leonardo da Vinci

The superstition seems to relate to various things, like the story of Jesus's Last Supper and crucifixion in which there were thirteen individuals present in the Upper Room on the thirteenth of Nisan Maundy Thursday, the night before his death on Good Friday. (Note: There were 13 people at the table (at the Last Supper) and the 13th was Jesus. The Last Supper was on a Thursday, and the next day was Friday, the day of crucifixion. When '13' and Friday come together, it's a double whammy.) (Note: In Christian tradition, fear of Friday the 13th stems from the day of the Crucifixion (Friday) and the number at the [table at the] Last Supper (13 [men]). Despite these origins, the Friday the 13th superstition dates back only to the Middle Ages.)

=== In conjunction with Friday ===
While there is evidence of both Friday (Note: Friday has been considered an unlucky day to undertake journeys or begin new projects at least since the 14th century, as witnessed by Chaucer's Canterbury Tales Opie, Iona; Tatem, Moira (2003). "FRIDAY an unlucky day". A Dictionary of Superstitions. Oxford Reference. ISBN 9780192829160.) and the number 13 being considered unlucky, there is no record of the two items being referred to as especially unlucky in conjunction before the 19th century.

==== The Knights Templar ====
Some cite the arrest of the Knights Templar on Friday, October 13, 1307, by officers of King Philip IV of France as the origin of the Friday the 13th superstition, but it is agreed the origins remain murky.

==== 19th century ====
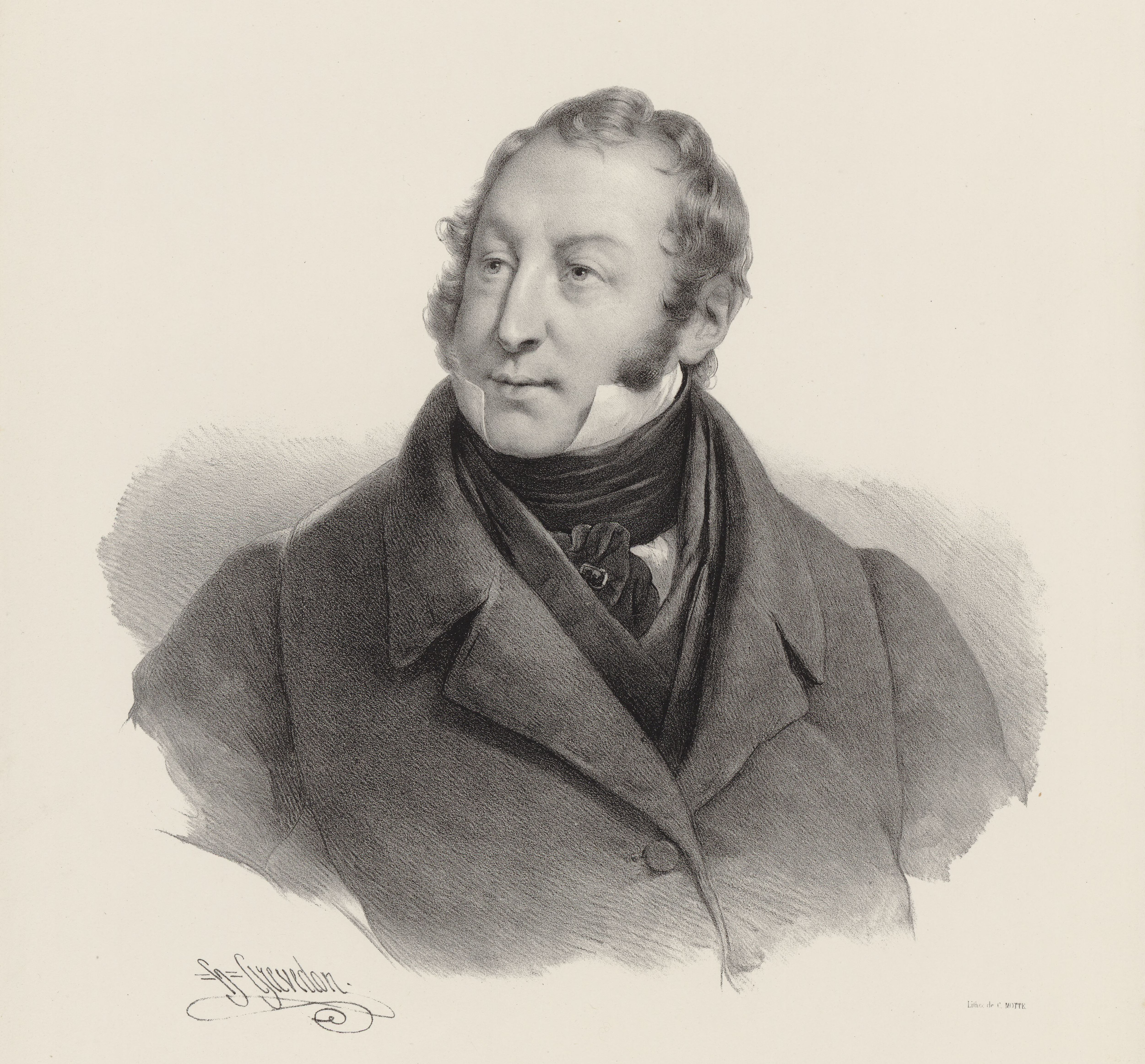
Gioachino Rossini by Henri Grevedon

In France, Friday 13th might have been associated with misfortune as early as the first half of the 19th century. A character in the 1834 play Les Finesses des Gribouilles states, "I was born on a Friday, December 13th, 1813 from which come all of my misfortunes".

An early documented reference in English occurs in H. S. Edwards' biography of Gioachino Rossini, who died on Friday 13th of November 1868:

"Rossini was surrounded to the last by admiring friends; and if it be true that, like so many Italians, he regarded Fridays as an unlucky day and thirteen as an unlucky number, it is remarkable that on Friday 13th of November he passed away."

==== Dissemination ====
It is possible that the publication in 1907 of T. W. Lawson's popular novel Friday, the Thirteenth, contributed to popularizing the superstition. In the novel, an unscrupulous broker takes advantage of the superstition to create a Wall Street panic on a Friday the 13th.

== Occurrence ==
=== Distribution ===
Each 400-year Gregorian solar cycle contains 146,097 days (with 97 leap days) or exactly 20,871 weeks. Each cycle contains the same pattern of days of the week and therefore the same pattern of Fridays that are on the 13th. The 13th day of the month is very slightly more likely to be a Friday than any other day of the week.

Distribution of the 13th day per weekday over 4,800 months (400 years)
Day of the week	Monday	Tuesday	Wednesday	Thursday	Friday	Saturday	Sunday
Occurrences	685	685	687	684	**688**	684	687

Any month that starts on a Sunday contains a Friday the 13th, and there is at least one Friday the 13th in every calendar year. The months with a Friday the 13th are determined by the Dominical letter (G, F, GF, etc.) of the year. Years which begin on the same day of the week and are of the same type (i.e. common year or leap year), will have a Friday the 13th in the same months.

This sequence, given here for 1900–2099, follows a 28-year cycle from 1 March 1900 to 28 February 2100:

Months with the 13th on a Friday for years from 1900 through 2100
Years during which a Friday the 13th occurs in the month to the right (current and subsequent year are marked in bold)	Month with its 13th on a Friday	Year length and weekday of January the 1st	Year's dominical letter
20th-century: 1905, 1911, 1922, 1928, 1933, 1939, 1950, 1956, 1961, 1967, 1978, 1984, 1989, 1995; 21st-century: 2006, 2012, 2017, 2023, 2034, 2040, 2045, 2051, 2062, 2068, 2073, 2079, 2090, 2096	January	365: Sunday; 366: Sunday	**A** **A**G
20th-century: 1903, 1914, 1920, 1925, 1931, 1942, 1948, 1953, 1959, 1970, 1976, 1981, 1987, 1998; 21st-century: 2004, 2009, 2015, **2026**, 2032, 2037, 2043, 2054, 2060, 2065, 2071, 2082, 2088, 2093, 2099	February	365: Thursday; 366: Thursday	**D** **D**C
20th-century: 1903, 1908, 1914, 1925, 1931, 1936, 1942, 1953, 1959, 1964, 1970, 1981, 1987, 1992; 1998; 21st-century: 2009, 2015, 2020, **2026**, 2037, 2043, 2048, 2054, 2065, 2071, 2076, 2082, 2093, 2099	March	365: Thursday; 366: Wednesday	**D** E**D**
20th-century: 1900, 1906, 1917, 1923, 1928, 1934, 1945, 1951, 1956, 1962, 1973, 1979, 1984; 1990; 21st-century: 2001, 2007, 2012, 2018, 2029, 2035, 2040, 2046, 2057, 2063, 2068, 2074, 2085, 2091, 2096	April	365: Monday; 366: Sunday	**G** A**G**
20th-century: 1904, 1910, 1921, 1927, 1932, 1938, 1949, 1955, 1960, 1966, 1977, 1983, 1988, 1994; 21st-century: 2005, 2011, 2016, 2022, 2033, 2039, 2044, 2050, 2061, 2067, 2072, 2078, 2089, 2095	May	365: Saturday; 366: Friday	**B** C**B**
20th-century: 1902, 1913, 1919, 1924, 1930, 1941, 1947, 1952, 1958, 1969, 1975, 1980, 1986, 1997; 21st-century: 2003, 2008, 2014, 2025, 2031, 2036, 2042, 2053, 2059, 2064, 2070, 2081, 2087, 2092, 2098	June	365: Wednesday; 366: Tuesday	**E** F**E**
20th-century: 1900, 1906, 1917, 1923, 1928, 1934, 1945, 1951, 1956, 1962, 1973, 1979, 1984, 1990; 21st-century: 2001, 2007, 2012, 2018, 2029, 2035, 2040, 2046, 2057, 2063, 2068, 2074, 2085, 2091, 2096	July	365: Monday; 366: Sunday	**G** A**G**
20th-century: 1909, 1915, 1920, 1926, 1937, 1943, 1948, 1954, 1965, 1971, 1976, 1982, 1993, 1999; 21st-century: 2004, 2010, 2021, **2027**, 2032, 2038, 2049, 2055, 2060, 2066, 2077, 2083, 2088, 2094, 2100	August	365: Friday; 366: Thursday	**C** D**C**
20th-century: 1901, 1907, 1912, 1918, 1929, 1935, 1940, 1946, 1957, 1963, 1968, 1974, 1985, 1991, 1996; 21st-century: 2002, 2013, 2019, 2024, 2030, 2041, 2047, 2052, 2058, 2069, 2075, 2080, 2086, 2097	September	365: Tuesday; 366: Monday	**F** G**F**
20th-century: 1905, 1911, 1916, 1922, 1933, 1939, 1944, 1950, 1961, 1967, 1972, 1978, 1989, 1995, 2000; 21st-century: 2006, 2017, 2023, 2028, 2034, 2045, 2051, 2056, 2062, 2073, 2079, 2084, 2090	October	365: Sunday; 366: Saturday	**A** B**A**
20th-century: 1903, 1908, 1914, 1925, 1931, 1936, 1942, 1953, 1959, 1964, 1970, 1981, 1987, 1992, 1998; 21st-century: 2009, 2015, 2020, **2026**, 2037, 2043, 2048, 2054, 2065, 2071, 2076, 2082, 2093, 2099	November	365: Thursday; 366: Wednesday	**D** E**D**
20th-century: 1901, 1907, 1912, 1918, 1929, 1935, 1940, 1946, 1957, 1963, 1968, 1974, 1985, 1991, 1996; 21st-century: 2002, 2013, 2019, 2024, 2030, 2041, 2047, 2052, 2058, 2069, 2075, 2080, 2086, 2097	December	365: Tuesday; 366: Monday	**F** G**F**

=== Frequency ===
Although there is always at least one Friday the 13th per calendar year, it can be as long as 14 months between two Friday the 13ths. The longest period that occurs without a Friday the 13th is 14 months, either from July to September the following year being a common year starting on Tuesday (F) (e.g. 2018–19 and 2029-30), or from August to October the following year being a leap year starting on Saturday (BA) (e.g. 1999–2000 and 2027–28). The shortest period that occurs with a Friday the 13th is just one month, from February to March in a common year starting on Thursday (D) (e.g. 2026 and 2037).

On average, there is a Friday the 13th once every 212.35 days. Friday the 13ths occurs with an average frequency of 1.7218 per year or about 3477 since the year 1 CE.

==== Frequency within a single year ====
There can be no more than three Friday the 13ths in a single calendar year; either in February, March, and November in a common year starting on Thursday (such as 2026 or 2037) (D), or January, April, and July in a leap year starting on Sunday (such as 2012 or 2040) (AG).

In the 2000s, there were three Friday the 13ths in 2009, and two Friday the 13ths in 2001, 2002, 2006, and 2007. In the 2010s, there were three Friday the 13ths in 2012 and 2015, and two in 2013, 2017, 2018, and 2019. In the 2020s, there were two Friday the 13ths in 2020, 2023 and 2024, as will be for 2029. There will also be three Friday the 13ths in 2026. The remaining years all have one Friday the 13th.

For the details see the table below; this table is for the Gregorian calendar and Jan/Feb for leap years:

Year modulo 28	1600 2000	1700 2100	1800 2200	1900 2300	Year modulo 28
00 06 17 23	Jan Oct	Feb Aug	Jun	Jan Apr Jul	00 06 17 23
01 07 12 18	Jan Apr Jul	May	Feb Mar Nov	Sep Dec	01 07 12 18
02 13 19 24	Sep Dec	Jan Oct	Feb Aug	Jun	02 13 19 24
03 08 14 25	Jun	Jan Apr Jul	May	Feb Mar Nov	03 08 14 25
09 15 20 26	Feb Mar Nov	Sep Dec	Jan Oct	Feb Aug	09 15 20 26
04 10 21 27	Feb Aug	Jun	Jan Apr Jul	May	04 10 21 27
05 11 16 22	May	Feb Mar Nov	Sep Dec	Jan Oct	05 11 16 22

== Social influence ==
According to the Stress Management Center and Phobia Institute in Asheville, North Carolina, an estimated 17–21 million people in the United States are affected by paraskavedekatriaphobia, the fear of Friday the 13th, making it the most feared day and date in history. Some people are so paralyzed by fear that they avoid their normal routines in doing business, taking flights or even getting out of bed. It has been estimated that US$ 800–900 million is lost in business on this day. Despite this, representatives for both Delta Air Lines and Continental Airlines (the latter now merged into United Airlines) have stated that their airlines do not suffer from any noticeable drop in travel on those Fridays.

In Finland, a consortium of governmental and nongovernmental organizations led by the Ministry of Social Affairs and Health promotes the National Accident Day (kansallinen tapaturmapäivä) to raise awareness about automotive safety, which always falls on a Friday the 13th. The event is coordinated by the Finnish Red Cross and has been held since 1995.

=== Rate of accidents ===
A study by Scanlon, Luben, Scanlon, & Singleton (1993) attracted attention from popular science literature, (Note: For starters, a 1993 study published in the British Medical Journal indicates otherwise: Researchers analyzed the traffic flow and number of injuries from car accidents on the southern section of London's M25 motorway during the five months that the 13th fell on a Friday between 1990 and 1992. They compared these numbers to data collected on Friday the 6th of the same months, and found that although there are consistently fewer vehicles on the road during the 13th – possibly as a result of superstitious people choosing not to drive that day, the researchers proposed – "the risk of hospital admission as a result of a transport accident may be increased by as much as 52 percent" on the 13th.) (Note: The study compared hospital admissions for traffic accidents on a Friday the 13th with those on a Friday the 6th in a community outside London. Despite a lower highway traffic volume on the 13th than on the 6th, admissions for traffic accident victims increased 52 percent on the 13th.) as it concluded that "the risk of hospital admission as a result of a transport accident may be increased by as much as 52 percent on the 13th"; however, the authors clearly state that "the numbers of admissions from accidents are too small to allow meaningful analysis". Subsequent studies have disproved any correlation between Friday the 13th and the rate of accidents.

On 12 June 2008 the Dutch Centre for Insurance Statistics stated to the contrary, that "fewer accidents and reports of fire and theft occur when the 13th of the month falls on a Friday than on other Fridays, because people are preventatively more careful or just stay home. Statistically speaking, driving is slightly safer on Friday the 13th, at least in the Netherlands; in the last two years, Dutch insurers received reports of an average 7,800 traffic accidents each Friday; but the average figure when the 13th fell on a Friday was just 7,500."

=== Tattoo Holiday ===
In recent years, Friday the 13th has emerged as a holiday for tattoo parlors and enthusiasts; with many shops running for 24 hours, and offering flash tattoos featuring the number 13 in the design. Some claim that having a number 13 tattoo can be an antidote to bad luck. According to Oliver Peck: "Bad luck would come your way, it would see the number 13, see that bad luck is already there, and it would pass on by."

== Similar dates ==
Similar dates are prevalent in many cultures, although it is unclear whether these similarities are in any way historically connected or only coincidental.

=== Tuesday the 13th in Hispanic and Greek culture ===
In Hispanic countries, instead of Friday, Tuesday the 13th (martes trece) is considered a day of bad luck.

The Greeks also consider Tuesday (and especially the 13th) an unlucky day. Tuesday is considered dominated by the influence of Ares, the god of war (or Mars, the Roman equivalent). The fall of Constantinople to the Fourth Crusade occurred on Tuesday 13 April 1204, and the Fall of Constantinople to the Ottomans happened on Tuesday 29 May 1453, events that strengthen the superstition about Tuesday. In addition, in Greek the name of the day is Triti (Τρίτη) meaning the third (day of the week), adding weight to the superstition, since bad luck is said to "come in threes".

There is a Tuesday the 13th in months that begin on a Thursday.

=== Friday the 17th in Italy ===
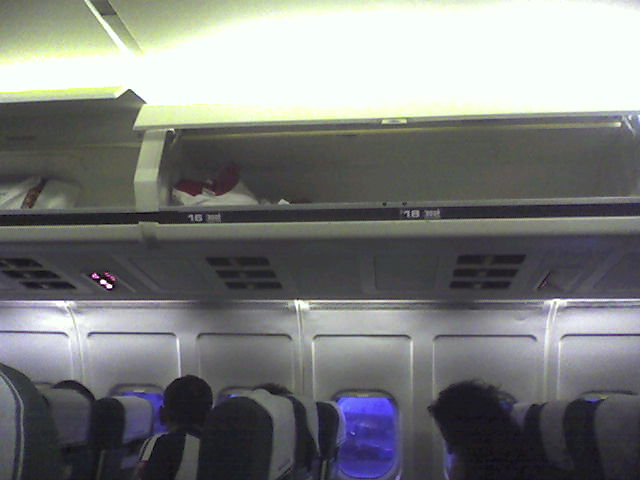
An Alitalia airplane without the row 17

In Italian popular culture, Friday the 17th (and not the 13th) is considered a bad luck day. The origin of this belief could be traced in the writing of the number 17, in Roman numerals: XVII. By shuffling the digits of the number one can get the Latin vīxī ("I have lived", implying death at present), an omen of bad luck. In fact, in Italy, 13 is generally considered a lucky number, although some people may consider 13 an unlucky number as well due to Americanization.

The 2000 parody film Shriek if You Know What I Did Last Friday the Thirteenth was released in Italy with the title Shriek – Hai impegni per venerdì 17? ("Shriek – Do You Have Something to Do on Friday the 17th?").

There is a Friday the 17th in months that begin on a Wednesday.

== See also ==
- 13 (number)
- Ides of March
- List of bad luck signs
- Solar cycle (calendar)
- St. Brice's Day massacre
- Triskaidekaphobia
- Tycho Brahe days
