= Century common year =

Common year in the Gregorian Calendar

A century common year (also known as an exceptional common year) is a common year in the Gregorian calendar that is divisible by 100 but not by 400. Like all common years, these years do not get an extra day in February, meaning they have 365 days instead of 366. These years are the only common years that are divisible by 4.

In the obsolete Julian Calendar, all years that were divisible by 4 were leap years, meaning no century years could be common years. However, this rule adds too many leap days, resulting in the calendar drifting with respect to the seasons, which is the same thing that would happen if there were no leap years at all. So, in 1582, Pope Gregory XIII introduced a slightly modified version of the Julian Calendar, the Gregorian Calendar, where century years would not be leap years if they are not divisible by 400. Therefore, 1700 is the first century year in the Gregorian Calendar being a common year. The years 1800 and 1900 were also century common years, and so will 2100, 2200, 2300, 2500, 2600, 2700, 2900, and 3000.

The Gregorian Calendar repeats itself every 400 years, so century common years start on a Friday if the remainder obtained when dividing the year by 400 is 100 (dominical letter C), Wednesday if the remainder is 200 (dominical letter E), and Monday if the remainder is 300 (dominical letter G). This means that century leap years always begin on a Saturday (dominical letter BA) and the leap day in those leap years always occur on a Tuesday.
