= Solar cycle (calendar) =

28-year cycle of the Julian calendar

The solar cycle is a 28-year cycle of the Julian calendar, and 400-year cycle of the Gregorian calendar with respect to the week. It occurs because leap years occur every 4 years, typically observed by adding a day to the month of February, making it February 29th. There are 7 possible days to start a leap year, making a 28-year sequence.

It may be calculated by adding 9 to the current year and taking the remainder once divided by 28 – if there is no remainder, then the number is 28. Mathematically, this can also be written as: (year number + 8) modulo 28) + 1.

The position of 2026 in the solar cycle is ((2026 + 8) modulo 28) + 1 = 18 + 1 = 19.

This cycle also occurs in the Gregorian calendar, but it is interrupted by years that are divisible by 100 but not by 400, which are common years. This interruption has the effect of skipping 16 years of the solar cycle between February 28 and March 1. Because the Gregorian cycle of 400 years has exactly 146,097 days, i.e. exactly 20,871 weeks, one can say that the Gregorian so-called solar cycle lasts 400 years.

== Relation with the Dominical letter ==
Calendar years are usually marked by Dominical letters indicating the first Sunday in a new year, thus the term solar cycle can also refer to a repeating sequence of Dominical letters. With the exceptions of century common years in the Gregorian calendar, a sequence of calendars is reused every 28 years.

In the Julian calendar there is a simple relation between the position of the year in the solar cycle and the Dominical letter. In the Gregorian calendar similar correspondences are only valid for one or two centuries at the most due to the fact that not all century years are leap years.

Table for the Dominical letter as function of the solar cycle (leap years indicated in bold face)
	1	2	3	4	5	6	7	8	9	10	11	12	13	14
Julian	**GF**	E	D	C	**BA**	G	F	E	**DC**	B	A	G	**FE**	D
Gregorian (1901-2099)	**FE**	D	C	B	**AG**	F	E	D	**CB**	A	G	F	**ED**	C
	15	16	17	18	19	20	21	22	23	24	25	26	27	28
Julian	C	B	**AG**	F	E	D	**CB**	A	G	F	**ED**	C	B	A
Gregorian (1901-2099)	B	A	**GF**	E	D	C	**BA**	G	F	E	**DC**	B	A	G

Example: the position of 1500 in the solar cycle is ((1500 + 8) modulo 28) + 1 = 24 + 1 = 25. The Dominical letter for 1500 is thus ED.

== See also ==
- Birkat Hachama
- Dominical letter
- Doomsday rule
- Friday the 13th
- Lunar Calendar
