= Century leap year =

Year evenly divisible by 400

Page from a calendar used by Hans Jakob vom Staal the Elder for notes on current events; February 1600 is shown with 29 days. The 29th is marked as the feast day of Saint Roman, whose feast was normally the 28th but was moved to the 29th in leap years.

A century leap year is a leap year in the Gregorian calendar that is evenly divisible by 400. This means that the other three century years are not leap years, making them an exception to the usual rule that a leap year is one that is evenly divisible by four (the Julian calendar does not have this exception). More specifically, the years 1600 and 2000 were century leap years while (where the Gregorian rule was observed) 1700, 1800 and 1900 were century common years.

== Gregorian reform ==
Like all leap years, it has an extra day in February for a total of 366 days instead of 365. In the obsolete Julian calendar, all years that were divisible by 4, including end-of-century years, were considered leap years. The Julian rule, however, adds too many leap days (about three extra leap days in 400 years), which resulted in the calendar drifting gradually with respect to the astronomical seasons. To remedy this, Pope Gregory XIII introduced in 1582 a slightly modified version of the Julian calendar, the Gregorian calendar, where century years are leap years only if they are divisible by 400. This eliminates three of the four end-of-century years in a 400-year period. For example, the years 1600, 2000, 2400, and 2800 are century leap years since those numbers are evenly divisible by 400, while 1700, 1800, 1900, 2100, 2200, 2300, 2500, 2600, 2700, 2900, and 3000 are common years despite being evenly divisible by 4. This scheme brings the average length of the calendar year significantly closer to the astronomical length of the year, nearly eliminating the drift of the calendar against the seasons.

The Gregorian calendar was adopted by various countries at different times over several centuries. Dates prior to 1582 are generally recorded using the Julian calendar, and different countries have different conventions about how to record dates between 1582 and their adoption of the Gregorian calendar. (Note: See, for example, Old Style and New Style dates.) Consequently, for example, the year 1700 was a leap year in the British and Russian empires but not in most of the rest of Europe; 1800 and 1900 were still leap years in the Russian Empire but not generally elsewhere. (Note: Other exceptions are listed at adoption of the Gregorian calendar.)
