= Thanksgiving (Canada) =

Annual holiday in October

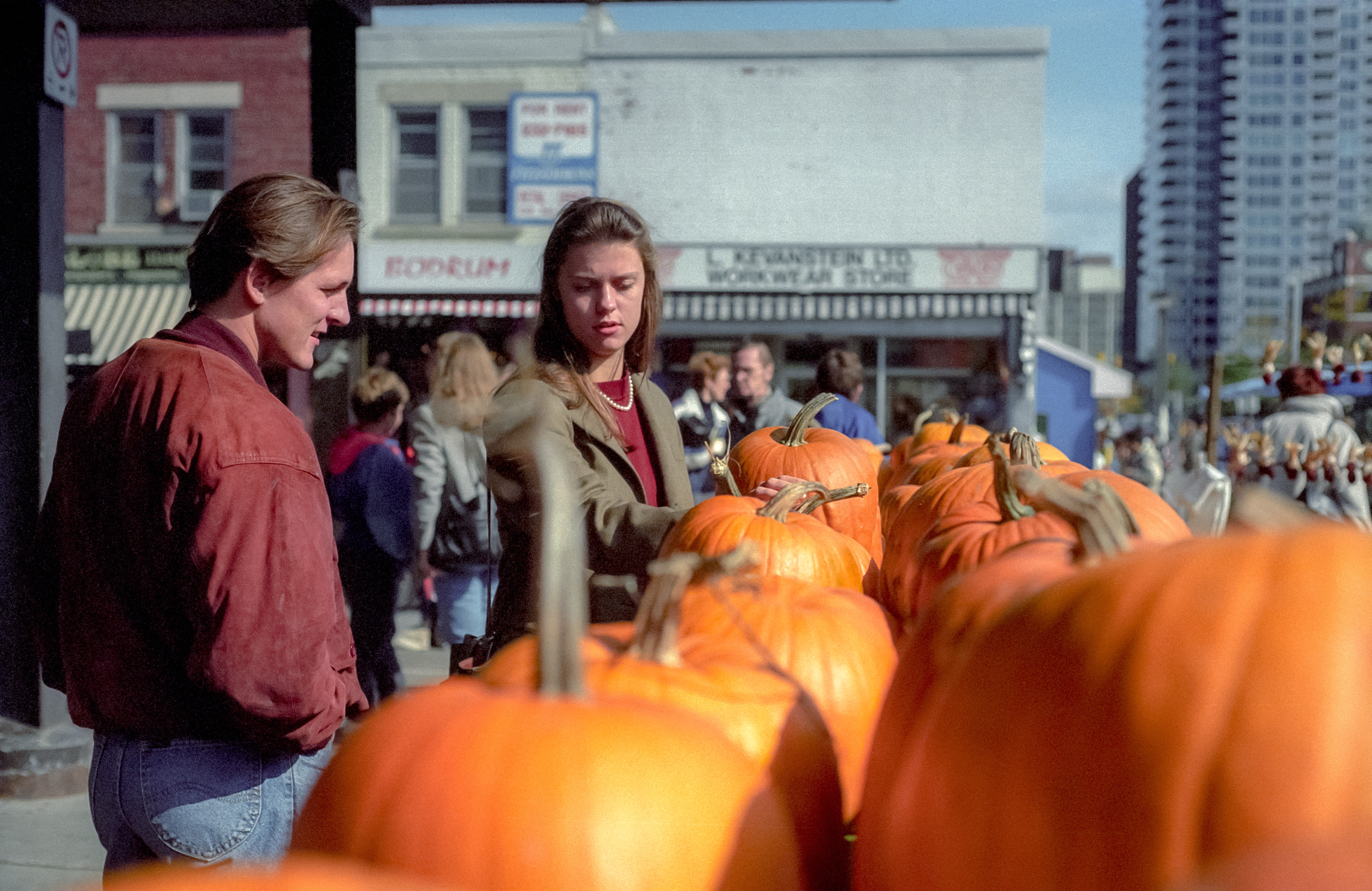
- Shopping for pumpkins for Thanksgiving in Ottawa's ByWard Market in 1991
- Observed by: Canada
- Type: Cultural
- Significance: A celebration of being thankful for what one has and the bounty of the previous year.
- Celebrations: Spending time with family, feasting, religious practice, football (Thanksgiving Day Classic)
- Date: Second Monday in October
- 2025 date: October 13
- 2026 date: October 12
- 2027 date: October 11
- 2028 date: October 9
- Frequency: Annual
- Related to: Traditional harvest festivals practiced historically in Britain and France, Thanksgiving in the United States

Thanksgiving (Note: French: Action de grâce) or Thanksgiving Day, (Note: French: Jour de l'Action de grâce) is an annual Canadian holiday held on the second Monday in October. Outside the country, it may be referred to as Canadian Thanksgiving to distinguish it from the American holiday of the same name and related celebrations in other regions.

Thanksgiving has been officially celebrated as an annual holiday in Canada since November 6, 1879. While the date varied by year and was not fixed, it was commonly the second Monday in October. On January 31, 1957, the Governor General of Canada Vincent Massey issued a proclamation stating: "a day of general thanksgiving to Almighty God for the blessings with which the people of Canada have been favoured" for observance annually on the second Monday in October.

== Statutory holiday ==
Thanksgiving is a statutory holiday in most of Canada, and an optional holiday in the Atlantic provinces of Prince Edward Island, Newfoundland and Labrador, Nova Scotia and New Brunswick. Companies that are regulated by the federal government, such as those in the telecommunications and banking sectors, recognize the holiday everywhere.

== Traditional holiday ==
As a liturgical festival, Thanksgiving corresponds to the British and continental European harvest festival, with churches decorated with cornucopias, pumpkins, corn, wheat sheaves, and other harvest bounty. While the actual Thanksgiving holiday is on a Monday, Canadians may gather for their Thanksgiving feast on any day during the long weekend; however, Sunday is considered the most common. Foods traditionally served at Thanksgiving include roasted turkey, roast beef, ham, stuffing, mashed potatoes with gravy, sweet potatoes, cranberry sauce, rutabagas and other tubers, sweet corn, various autumn vegetables (including various kinds of squashes, but also Brussels sprouts), pumpkin pie, apple pie, and glazed yams. Various regional dishes and desserts may also be served, including salmon, wild game, Jiggs dinner with split-pea pudding, butter tarts, and Nanaimo bars.

In Canadian football, the Canadian Football League holds the Thanksgiving Day Classic. It is one of two weeks in which the league plays on Monday afternoons, the other being the Labour Day Classic. Historically a doubleheader, since 2022 only one game has been hosted on the holiday, with the Montreal Alouettes permanently hosting the Ottawa Redblacks. Beginning in 2027, the Thanksgiving Day Classic will serve as the final game(s) of the CFL regular season.

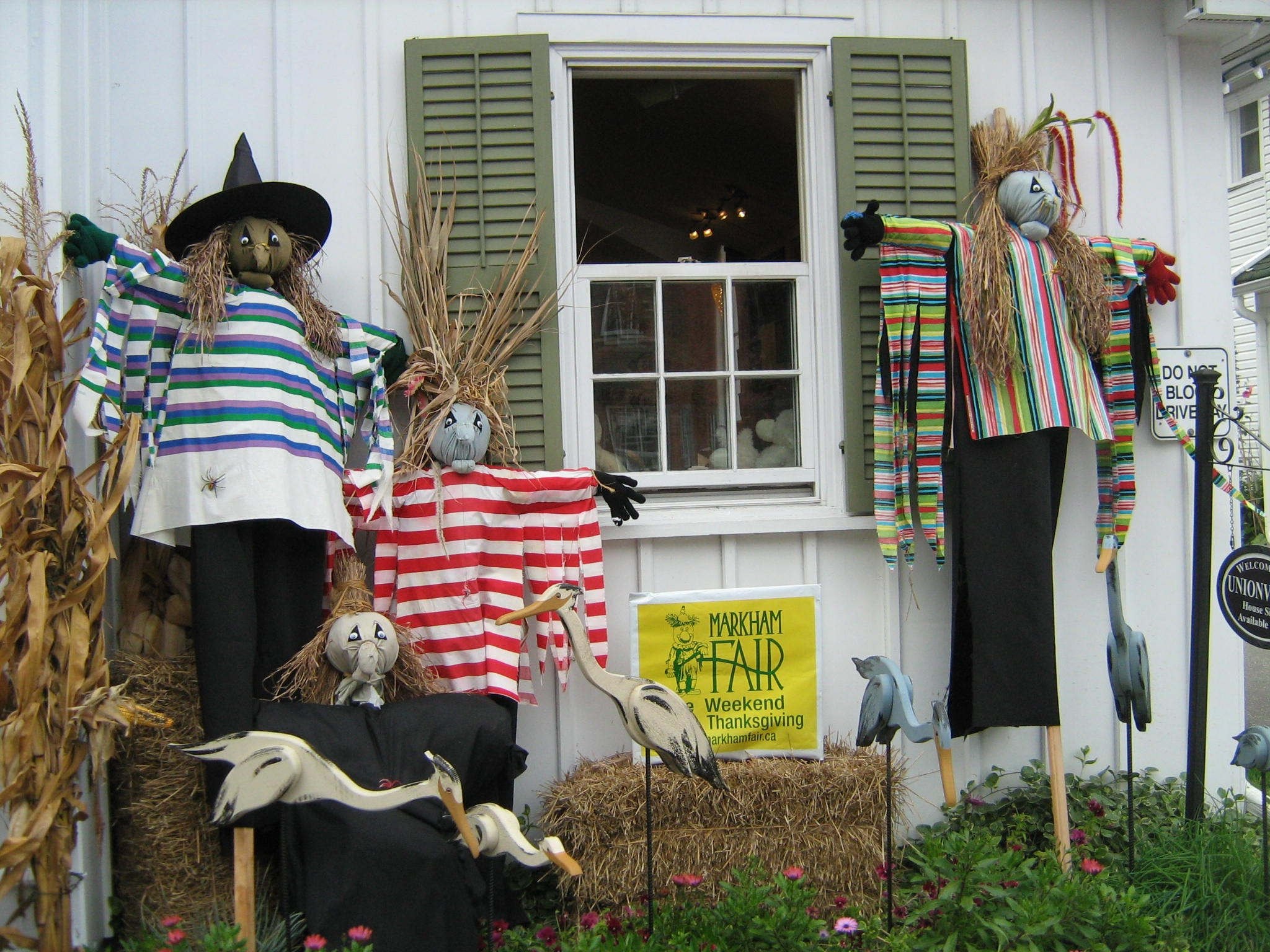
Scarecrows on display at the Markham Fair. Several communities host fairs the week before Thanksgiving.

Many communities in Canada hold events in the week prior to and on the day of the holiday. For example, the Markham Fair is an annual agricultural and harvest festival held during the weekend before Thanksgiving, Kitchener-Waterloo Oktoberfest holds an annual parade consisting of floats, civic figures in the region, local performance troupes and marching bands, and Fort Langley holds a widely attended neighbourhood festival celebrating the cranberry harvest, in which local crafts, produce, and artisan goods are sold.

== History ==
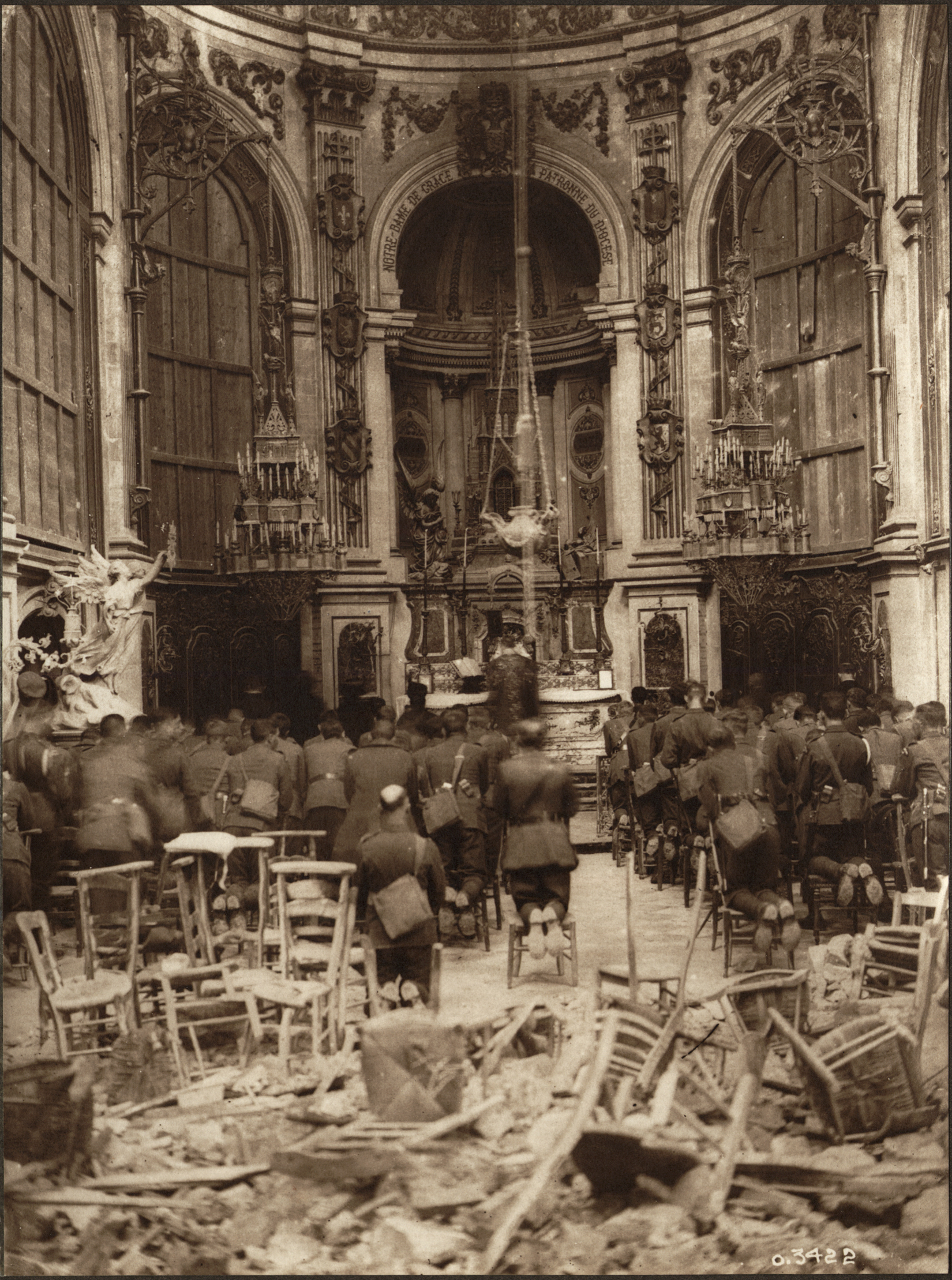
Canadian troops attend a Thanksgiving Mass in the bombed-out Cambrai Cathedral, France, in October 1918.

According to historians, the first celebration of Thanksgiving in North America occurred in 1579 after the safe landing of Martin Frobisher's fleet in Newfoundland after an unsuccessful attempt in search of the Northwest Passage. His third voyage, to the Frobisher Bay area of Baffin Island in the present Canadian territory of Nunavut, set out with the intention of starting a small settlement. His fleet of fifteen ships was outfitted with men, materials, and provisions. However, the loss of one of his ships through contact with ice, along with many of the building materials, was to prevent him from doing so. The expedition was plagued by ice and freak storms, which at times scattered the fleet; on meeting again at their anchorage in Frobisher Bay, "... Mayster Wolfall, a learned man, appointed by Her Majesty's Counsel to be their minister and preacher, made unto them a godly sermon, exhorting them especially to be thankful to God for their strange and miraculous deliverance in those so dangerous places ...". They celebrated Holy Communion and, "The celebration of divine mystery was the first sign, scale, and confirmation of Christ's name, death and passion ever known in all these quarters." (The notion of Frobisher's service being first on the continent has come into dispute, as Spaniards conducted similar services in Spanish North America during the mid-16th century, decades before Frobisher's arrival.)

Years later, French settlers, having crossed the ocean and arrived in Canada with explorer Samuel de Champlain, from 1604, also held feasts of thanks. They formed the Order of Good Cheer and held feasts, possibly with participation of some local indigenous groups or individuals with whom they had some contact, though this is apocryphal and may be derived from some conflation with the prominent American legend about their similar holiday.

After the Seven Years' War ended in 1763, with New France handed over to the British, the citizens of Halifax held a special day of Thanksgiving. Thanksgiving days were observed beginning in 1799 but did not occur every year. The 1799 Thanksgiving was held to commemorate the military victory of British North America "over its enemy".

During and after the American Revolution, American refugees who remained loyal to Great Britain moved from the newly independent United States to the provinces that would later unite as the Dominion of Canada, including the newly established colonies of Upper Canada (now Ontario) and New Brunswick. Many of the members of the Old Colony Club, which consisted of descendants of the Pilgrims who partook in the traditional "first Thanksgiving" of 1621, were Loyalists; when they were exiled, they brought the customs and practices of the American Thanksgiving to Canada, such as the turkey, pumpkin, and squash.

Lower Canada and Upper Canada observed Thanksgiving on different dates; for example, in 1816, both celebrated Thanksgiving for the termination of the War of 1812 between France, the U.S. and Great Britain, with Lower Canada marking the day on May 21 and Upper Canada on June 18 (Waterloo Day). In 1838, Lower Canada used Thanksgiving to celebrate the end of the Lower Canada Rebellion. Following the rebellions, the two Canadas were merged into a united Province of Canada, which observed Thanksgiving six times from 1850 to 1865. During this period, Thanksgiving was a solemn, mid-week celebration.

The first Thanksgiving Day after Confederation was observed as a civic holiday on April 5, 1872, to celebrate the recovery of the Prince of Wales (later King Edward VII) from a serious illness.

For many years before it was declared a national holiday in 1879, Thanksgiving was celebrated in either late October or early November. From 1879 onward, Thanksgiving Day has been observed every year, the date initially being a Thursday in November. After World War I, an amendment to the Armistice Day Act established that Armistice Day and Thanksgiving would, starting in 1921, both be celebrated on the Monday of the week in which November 11 occurred. Ten years later, in 1931, the two days became separate holidays, and Armistice Day was renamed Remembrance Day. From 1931 to 1957, the date was set by proclamation, generally falling on the second Monday in October, except for 1935, when it was moved due to a general election. In 1957, Parliament fixed Thanksgiving as the second Monday in October. The theme of the Thanksgiving holiday also changed each year to reflect an important event for which to be thankful. In its early years, it was for an abundant harvest and occasionally for a special anniversary.

== See also ==
- Thanksgiving
- Christmas
- Public holidays in Canada
- Columbus Day (U.S.)
