= Dominical letter =

Method to find the day of the week of dates

Dominical letters or Sunday letters are a method used to determine the day of the week for particular dates. When using this method, each year is assigned a letter (or pair of letters for leap years) depending on which day of the week the year starts with. The Dominical letter for the current year 2026 is D.

Dominical letters are derived from the Roman practice of marking the repeating sequence of eight letters A–H (commencing with A on January 1) on stone calendars to indicate each day's position in the eight-day market week (nundinæ). The word is derived from the number nine due to their practice of inclusive counting. After the introduction of Christianity a similar sequence of seven letters A–G was added alongside, again commencing with January 1. The dominical letter marks the Sundays. Nowadays they are used primarily as part of the computus, which is the method of calculating the date of Easter.

A common year is assigned a single dominical letter, indicating which lettered days are Sundays in that particular year (hence the name, from Latin dominica for Sunday). Thus, 2026 is D, indicating that all D days will be Sunday, and by inference, January 4, 2026, is a Sunday. Leap years are given two letters, the first valid for January 1 – February 28 (or February 24, see below), the second for the remainder of the year.

In leap years, the leap day may or may not have a letter. In the Catholic version it does, but in the 1662 and subsequent Anglican versions it does not. The Catholic version causes February to have 29 days by doubling the sixth day before March 1, inclusive, thus both halves of the doubled day have a dominical letter of F. The Anglican version adds a day to February that did not exist in common years, February 29, thus it does not have a dominical letter of its own. After the 1662 reform there was correspondence between the Archbishop of Canterbury and the printer of the Book of Common Prayer, in which it was explained that the feast day of St Matthias now fell on February 24 every year.

In either case, all other dates have the same dominical letter every year, but the days of the dominical letters change within a leap year before and after the intercalary day, February 24 or February 29.

== History and arrangement ==
According to Thurston 1909, p. 109 dominical letters are:

a device adopted from the Romans by the old chronologers to aid them in finding the day of the week corresponding to any given date, and indirectly to facilitate the adjustment of the 'Proprium de Tempore' to the 'Proprium Sanctorum' when constructing the ecclesiastical calendar for any year. The Church, on account of her complicated system of movable and immovable feasts... has from an early period taken upon herself as a special charge to regulate the measurement of time. To secure uniformity in the observance of feasts and fasts, she began, even in the patristic age, to supply a computus, or system of reckoning, by which the relation of the solar and lunar years might be accommodated and the celebration of Easter determined. Naturally she adopted the astronomical methods then available, and these methods and the terminology belonging to them having become traditional, are perpetuated in a measure to this day, even after the reform of the calendar, in the prolegomena to the Breviary and Missal.

The Romans were accustomed to divide the year into nundinæ, periods of eight days; and in their marble fasti, or calendars, of which numerous specimens remain, they used the first eight letters of the alphabet [A to H] to mark the days of which each period was composed. When the Oriental seven-day period, or week, was introduced in the time of Augustus, the first seven letters of the alphabet were employed in the same way to indicate the days of the new division of time. In fact, fragmentary calendars on marble still survive in which both a cycle of eight letters – A to H – indicating nundinæ, and a cycle of seven letters – A to G – indicating weeks, are used side by side (see "Corpus Inscriptionum Latinarum", 2nd ed., I, 220. -The same peculiarity occurs in the Philocalian Calendar of AD 356, ibid., p. 256). This device was imitated by the Christians, and in their calendars the days of the year from 1 January to 31 December were marked with a continuous recurring cycle of seven letters: A, B, C, D, E, F, G. A was always set against 1 January, B against 2 January, C against 3 January, and so on. Thus F fell to 6 January, G to 7 January; A again recurred on 8 January, and also, consequently, on 15 January, 22 January, and 29 January. Continuing in this way, 30 January was marked with a B, 31 January with a C, and 1 February with a D. Supposing this to be carried on through all the days of an ordinary year (i.e. not a leap year), it will be found that a D corresponds to 1 March, G to 1 April, B to 1 May, E to 1 June, G to 1 July, C to 1 August, F to 1 September, A to 1 October, D to 1 November, and F to 1 December – a result which Durandus recalled by the following distich:

Alta Domat Dominus, Gratis Beat Equa Gerentes

Contemnit Fictos, Augebit Dona Fideli.

Another one is "Add G, beg C, fad F," and yet another is "At Dover dwell George Brown, Esquire; Good Christopher Finch; and David Fryer."

== Dominical letter cycle ==
Thurston 1909 continues:

Now, as a moment's reflection shows, if 1 January is a Sunday, all the days marked by A will also be Sundays; if 1 January is a Saturday, Sunday will fall on 2 January, which is a B, and all the other days marked B will be Sundays; if 1 January is a Monday, then Sunday will not come until 7 January, a G, and all the days marked G will be Sundays ...

It is plain, however, that when leap year occurs, a complication is introduced. February has then twenty-nine days. According to the Anglican and civil calendars this extra day is added at the end of the month; according to the Catholic ecclesiastical calendar 24 February is counted twice. But in either case 1 March is then one day later in the week than 1 February, or, in other words, for the rest of the year the Sundays come a day earlier than they would in a common year. This is expressed by saying that a leap year has two Dominical Letters, the second being the letter which precedes that with which the year started.

Of course, "24 February" is not "counted twice". The 23rd is ante diem vii kalendas Martias, the next day in a leap year is a.d. bis sextum kal. Mart., the next day is the regular a.d.vi kal. Mart., and so to the end of the month. For example, in 2024 (=GF), all days preceding the leap day corresponded to a common-year G calendar, and all days afterward corresponded to a common-year F calendar. The same thing will happen in 2028 (=BA), for example all days preceding the leap day will correspond to a common-year B calendar, and all days afterward will correspond to a common-year A calendar. The relevant line of the Februarius page in the Kalendarium of a 1913 Breviarium Romanum reads:

5 |f|vj|24|S. MATHIÆ APOSTOLI, dupl. 2. class.

The first column is the epact, a replacement for the golden number, from which the age of the moon was computed and announced in some English cathedrals prior to the Reformation. The second column is the letter, the third the Roman date and the fourth the modern date. A note at the foot of the page reads:

In anno bissextili mensis Februarius est dierum 29. et Festum S. Mathiæ celebratur die 25. Februarii et bis dicitur sexto Kalendas, id est die 24. et die 25. et littera Dominicalis, quæ assumpta fuit in mense Januario, mutatur in præcedentem; ut si in Januario littera Dominicalis fuerit A, mutatur in præcedentem, quæ est g. etc.; et littera f bis servit, 24. et 25.

In a bissextile year the month February is of 29 days and the Feast of St. Matthias is celebrated on 25 February, and twice is said on the sixth Kalends, that is on the 24th and 25th, and the Sunday letter, which was assumed in the month of January, is changed to the preceding; so if in January the Sunday letter may have been A, it is changed to the preceding, which is G. etc.; and letter F twice serves, 24th and 25th.

== Dominical letters of the years ==
The dominical letter of a year provides the link between the date and the day of the week on which it falls. The following are the correspondences between dominical letters and the day of the week on which their corresponding years is day and date:

Common years:

- A: common year starting on Sunday
- B: common year starting on Saturday
- C: common year starting on Friday
- D: common year starting on Thursday
- E: common year starting on Wednesday
- F: common year starting on Tuesday
- G: common year starting on Monday

Leap years:

- AG: leap year starting on Sunday
- BA: leap year starting on Saturday
- CB: leap year starting on Friday
- DC: leap year starting on Thursday
- ED: leap year starting on Wednesday
- FE: leap year starting on Tuesday
- GF: leap year starting on Monday

The Gregorian calendar repeats every 400 years (i. e., every four centuries). Of the 400 years in one Gregorian cycle, there are:

- 44 common years for each single Dominical letter D and F;
- 43 common years for each single Dominical letter A, B, C, E, and G;
- 15 leap years for each double Dominical letter AG and CB;
- 14 leap years for each double Dominical letter ED and FE;
- 13 leap years for each double Dominical letter BA, DC, and GF.

Thus 58 out of 400 years begin as A, C, or F, while 57 begin as D or E and 56 begin as B or G. The end of a year preceding a given year has the next letter (meaning A years are preceded by years ending as B), so 58 of 400 years end as B, D or G, whereas 57 end as E or F and 56 end as C or A. This means, for example, that Christmas falls on a Saturday or Monday (C and A years, respectively) 56 times, Wednesday or Thursday (F and E years, respectively) 57 times, and Friday, Sunday or Tuesday (D, B and G years, resp.) 58 times in the span of four centuries.

The Julian calendar repeats every 28 years. Of the 28 years in one Julian cycle, there are:

- 3 common years for each single Dominical letter A, B, C, D, E, F, and G;
- 1 leap year for each double Dominical letter BA, CB, DC, ED, FE, GF, and AG.

Within the 28-year cycle, the single Dominical letters have gaps of 6 years or 11 years. For example, for Dominical letter G, there is a 6-year gap between 2001 and 2007, then an 11-year gap between 2007 and 2018.

== Calculation ==
The dominical letter of a year can be calculated based on any method for calculating the day of the week, with letters in reverse order compared to numbers indicating the day of the week.

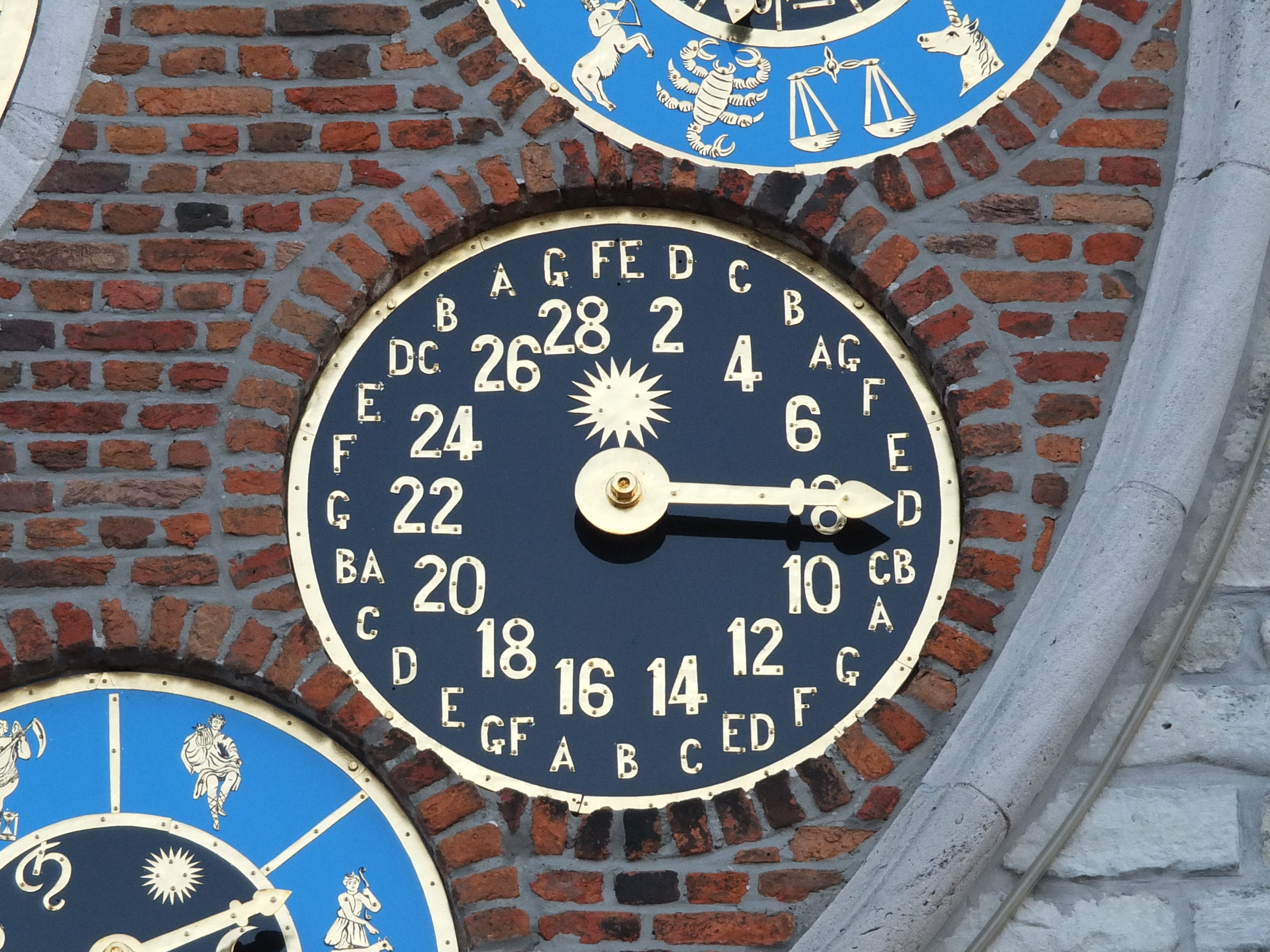
The solar cycle and dominical letter on the Jubilee clock of the Zimmer tower

For Gregorian calendar:

- ignore periods of 400 years
- considering the second letter in the case of a leap year:
  - for one century within two multiples of 400, go forward two letters from BA for 2000, hence C, E, G.
  - for remaining years, go back one letter every year, two for leap years (this corresponds to writing two letters, no letter is skipped).
  - to avoid up to 99 steps within a century, the table below can be used.

Year mod 28	#
00 06 12 17 23	0
01 07 12 18 24	6
02 08 13 19 24	5
03 08 14 20 25	4
04 09 15 20 26	3
04 10 16 21 27	2
05 11 16 22 00	1

Red for the first two months of leap years.

For example, to find the Dominical Letter of the year 1913:

- 1900 is G and 13 corresponds to 5
- G + 5 = G − 2 = E, so 1913 is E
- Sundays of 1913 were on E days (e.g. January 5)

Similarly, for 2007:

- 2000 is BA and 7 corresponds to 6
- A + 6 = A − 1 = G, so 2007 is G
- Sundays of 2007 were on G days (e.g. January 7)

For leap year 2040:

- 2000 is BA and 40 mod 28 = 12
- For the first two months of 2040, red 12 corresponds to 0:
  - A + 0 = A, so 2040 starts with A
  - Sundays of January and February 2040 are on A days (e.g. January 1)
- For the remaining months of 2040, plain 12 corresponds to 6:
  - A + 6 = A - 1 = G, so 2040 ends with G
  - Sundays of March to December 2040 are on G days (e.g. October 7)
- Overall, 2040 is AG

For 2065:

- 2000 is BA and 65 mod 28 = 9 corresponds to 3
- A + 3 = A − 4 = D, so 2065 is D
- Sundays of 2065 are on D days (e.g. January 4)

=== The odd plus 11 method ===
A simpler method suitable for finding the year's dominical letter was discovered in 2010. It is called the "odd plus 11" method.

The procedure accumulates a running total T as follows:

1. Let T be the year's last two digits.
2. If T is odd, add 11.
3. Let T = T/2.
4. If T is odd, add 11.
5. Let T = T mod 7.
6. Count forward T letters from the century's dominical letter (A, C, E or G see above) to get the year's dominical letter.

The formula is
$$T = \left( \frac{y+11(y \bmod 2)}{2} + 11 \left(\frac{y+11(y \bmod 2)}{2}\bmod 2\right)\right) \bmod 7.$$

=== De Morgan's rule ===
This rule was stated by Augustus De Morgan:

1. Add 1 to the given year.
2. Take the quotient found by dividing the given year by 4 (neglecting the remainder).
3. Take 16 from the centurial figures of the given year if that can be done.
4. Take the quotient of III divided by 4 (neglecting the remainder).
5. From the sum of I, II and IV, subtract III.
6. Find the remainder of V divided by 7: this is the number of the Dominical Letter, supposing A, B, C, D, E, F, G to be equivalent respectively to 6, 5, 4, 3, 2, 1, 0.

So the formulæ (using the floor function) for the Gregorian calendar is
$$1.\quad \left(1 + \text{year} + \left\lfloor\frac{\text{year}}{4}\right\rfloor + \left\lfloor\frac{\text{year} - 1600}{400}\right\rfloor - \left\lfloor\frac{\text{year} - 1600}{100}\right\rfloor\right) \bmod 7.$$
It is equivalent to
$$2.\quad \left(\text{year} + \Big\lfloor\frac{\text{year}}{4}\Big\rfloor + \Big\lfloor\frac{\text{year}}{400}\Big\rfloor - \Big\lfloor\frac{\text{year}}{100}\Big\rfloor - 1\right) \bmod 7$$
and
$$3.\quad \left(y + \Big\lfloor\frac{y}{4}\Big\rfloor + 5(c\bmod4) -1\right) \bmod 7$$
(where $y = \text{year} \bmod 100$ = last two digits of the year, $c = \left\lfloor\text{year} / 100\right\rfloor$ = century part of the year).

For example, to find the Dominical Letter of the year 1913:
$$1.\quad (1 + 1913 + 478 + 0 - 3) \bmod 7 = 2$$
$$2.\quad (1913 + 478 + 4 - 19 - 1) \bmod 7 = 2$$
$$3.\quad (13 + 3 + 5(3) -1) \bmod 7 = 2$$
Hence, the Dominical Letter is E in the Gregorian calendar.

De Morgan's rules no. 1 and 2 for the Julian calendar:
$$1.\text{ and }2.\quad \left(\text{year} + \Big\lfloor\frac{\text{year}}{4}\Big\rfloor - 3\right) \bmod 7$$

To find the Dominical Letter of the year 1913 in the Julian calendar:
$$(1913 + 478 - 3) \bmod 7 = 1$$
Hence, the Dominical Letter is F in the Julian calendar.

In leap years the formulæ above give the Dominical Letter for the last ten months of the year. To find the Dominical Letter for the first two months of the year to the leap day (inclusive) subtract 1 from the calculated number representing the original Dominical Letter; if the new number is less than 0, it must be changed to 6.

=== Dominical letter in relation to the Doomsday Rule ===
The "doomsday" concept in the doomsday algorithm is mathematically related to the Dominical letter. Because the letter of a date equals the dominical letter of a year (DL) plus the day of the week (DW), and the letter for the doomsday is C except for the portion of leap years before February 29 in which it is D, we have:
$$\begin{align}
\text{C} &= (\text{DL} + \text{DW}) \bmod 7 \\
\text{DL} &= (\text{C} - \text{DW}) \bmod 7 \\
\text{DW} &= (\text{C} - \text{DL}) \bmod 7
\end{align}$$
Note: in our context, letters and days of the week are assigned indices:

#	Letter of a date	Dominical letter of year (DL)	Day of the week (DW)
0	G		Sunday
1	A		Monday
2	B		Tuesday
3	C		Wednesday
4	D		Thursday
5	E		Friday
6	F		Saturday

i.e. in our context, C is mathematically identical to 3.

Hence, for instance, the doomsday of the year 2013 is Thursday, so $\text{DL} = (3-4) \bmod 7 = 6 = \text{F}$. The dominical letter of the year 1913 is E, so the doomsday that year has $\text{DW} = (3-5) \bmod 7 = 5 = \text{Friday}$.

Doomsday	Dominical letter	
Doomsday	Common year	Leap year
Sunday	C	DC
Monday	B	CB
Tuesday	A	BA
Wednesday	G	AG
Thursday	F	GF
Friday	E	FE
Saturday	D	ED

=== All in one table ===
If the year of interest is not within the table, use a tabular year which gives the same remainder when divided by 400 (Gregorian calendar) or 700 (Julian calendar). In the case of the Revised Julian calendar, find the date of Easter Sunday (see the section "Calculating Easter Sunday", subsection "Revised Julian calendar" below) and enter it into the "Table of letters for the days of the year" below. If the year is a leap year, the dominical letter for January and February is found by inputting the date of Easter Monday. Note the different rules for leap years:

- Gregorian calendar: every year which divides exactly by 4, but of century years only those which divide exactly by 400; therefore ignore the left-hand letter given for a century year which is not a leap year.
- Julian calendar: every year which divides exactly by 4.
- Revised Julian calendar: every year which divides exactly by 4, but of century years only those which give the remainder 200 or 600 when divided by 900.

Dominical or Sunday letters for all years
Julian calendar →	500 1200 1900 2600	600 1300 2000 2700	(0) 700 1400 2100 2800	100 800 1500 2200 2900	200 900 1600 2300	300 1000 1700 2400	400 1100 1800 2500
(Proleptic) Gregorian calendar →	(0) (400) (800) (1200) 1600 2000 2400 2800		(100) (500) (900) (1300) 1700 2100 2500 2900		(200) (600) (1000) (1400) 1800 2200 2600		(300) (700) (1100) (1500) 1900 2300 2700
00^{Gregorian}	BA		C		E		G
00^{J} 28 56 84	BA	CB	DC	ED	FE	GF	AG
01 29 57 85	G	A	B	C	D	E	F
02 30 58 86	F	G	A	B	C	D	E
03 31 59 87	E	F	G	A	B	C	D
04 32 60 88	DC	ED	FE	GF	AG	BA	CB
05 33 61 89	B	C	D	E	F	G	A
06 34 62 90	A	B	C	D	E	F	G
07 35 63 91	G	A	B	C	D	E	F
08 36 64 92	FE	GF	AG	BA	CB	DC	ED
09 37 65 93	D	E	F	G	A	B	C
10 38 66 94	C	D	E	F	G	A	B
11 39 67 95	B	C	D	E	F	G	A
12 40 68 96	AG	BA	CB	DC	ED	FE	GF
13 41 69 97	F	G	A	B	C	D	E
14 42 70 98	E	F	G	A	B	C	D
15 43 71 99	D	E	F	G	A	B	C
16 44 72	CB	DC	ED	FE	GF	AG	BA
17 45 73	A	B	C	D	E	F	G
18 46 74	G	A	B	C	D	E	F
19 47 75	F	G	A	B	C	D	E
20 48 76	ED	FE	GF	AG	BA	CB	DC
21 49 77	C	D	E	F	G	A	B
22 50 78	B	C	D	E	F	G	A
23 51 79	A	B	C	D	E	F	G
24 52 80	GF	AG	BA	CB	DC	ED	FE
25 53 81	E	F	G	A	B	C	D
26 54 82	D	E	F	G	A	B	C
27 55 83	C	D	E	F	G	A	B

Dates of paschal full moon
Golden number ((Year mod 19) + 1)	Paschal Full Moon (Easter is the following Sunday)	
Golden number ((Year mod 19) + 1)	Julian calendar	Gregorian (1900–2199)
1	Apr 5	Apr 14
2	Mar 25	Apr 3
3	Apr 13	Mar 23
4	Apr 2	Apr 11
5	Mar 22	Mar 31
6	Apr 10	Apr 18
7	Mar 30	Apr 8
8	Apr 18	Mar 28
9	Apr 7	Apr 16
10	Mar 27	Apr 5
11	Apr 15	Mar 25
12	Apr 4	Apr 13
13	Mar 24	Apr 2
14	Apr 12	Mar 22
15	Apr 1	Apr 10
16	Mar 21	Mar 30
17	Apr 9	Apr 17
18	Mar 29	Apr 7
19	Apr 17	Mar 27

Letters for the days of the year
(2 Sunday letters in leap years, the one for March to December preceding the one for January and February in the series; 1 Sunday letter in common years)				Days of month						
(2 Sunday letters in leap years, the one for March to December preceding the one for January and February in the series; 1 Sunday letter in common years)				1	2	3	4	5	6	7
(2 Sunday letters in leap years, the one for March to December preceding the one for January and February in the series; 1 Sunday letter in common years)				8	9	10	11	12	13	14
(2 Sunday letters in leap years, the one for March to December preceding the one for January and February in the series; 1 Sunday letter in common years)				15	16	17	18	19	20	21
(2 Sunday letters in leap years, the one for March to December preceding the one for January and February in the series; 1 Sunday letter in common years)				22	23	24	25	26	27	28
(2 Sunday letters in leap years, the one for March to December preceding the one for January and February in the series; 1 Sunday letter in common years)				(29)	(30)	(31)				
Months	Jan		Oct	A	B	C	D	E	F	G
Months	Feb	Mar	Nov	D	E	F	G	A	B	C
Months	Apr	Jul		G	A	B	C	D	E	F
Months	May			B	C	D	E	F	G	A
Months	Jun			E	F	G	A	B	C	D
Months		Aug		C	D	E	F	G	A	B
Months		Sep	Dec	F	G	A	B	C	D	E

=== Years with special dominical letters ===
When a country switched to the Gregorian calendar, there could be some unusual combinations of dominical letters.

==== Some examples ====
- 1582: Many Catholic countries switched to the Gregorian calendar Friday October 15. The table above indicates that year 1582 had the dominical letter G in the Julian calendar and C in the Gregorian one. So the dominical letters for 1582 in these Catholic countries became GC for mixing the two calendars used in this legal year, a special combination not seen before and after with a single calendar used in the same legal year.
- 1712: Sweden had a February 30 in 1712, and the Julian calendar dominical letters FE and in the Gregorian one dominical letters CB, but in Sweden started as GF, so the dominical letters for 1712 in Sweden were GE, a very special combination which also only applies to this legal year.
- 1752: The British Empire and its colonies switched to the Gregorian calendar Thursday September 14. 1752, a leap year, had in the Julian calendar dominical letters ED and in the Gregorian one dominical letters BA, so the dominical letters for 1752 in Britain were EDA, a very special combination which also only applies to this legal year.

== Calculating Easter Sunday ==
Enter the "all in one table" to find the date of the paschal full moon, then use the "week table" below to find the day of the week on which it falls. Easter is the following Sunday.

=== Week table: Julian and Gregorian calendars for AD years since March 1 AD 4 ===
Note that this table does not work for AD years at the early stage of the real Julian calendar before March 1 AD 4 or for any BC year, except when using the Julian calendar rules for proleptic dates (which are different from effective historic dates, whose effective calendar in use depended on the location of dated events or the location of the person using the calendar, sometimes differently between political/civil or religious purposes in places where both calendars still coexisted). The duration of months, and the number and placement of intercalated days also changed inconsistently before AD 42 in the early local Julian calendars which used native names for the months, depending on places and years, causing finally a lot of confusion in the population (so dating events precisely in that period is often difficult, unless they are correlated with observed lunar cycles, or with days of the week, or with another calendar).

In these early AD years and in all BC years, with the effective Julian calendars used locally to align the counting of years (but still with the tradition inherited from the earlier Roman calendar for noting days in each year), a variable number of days at end of the months (after the last day of its ides but before the last day of calends which started the next month) were also still counted relatively from the start of the next named month (on the last day of its calends), and years were theoretically starting on March 1 (but with the last days of the year in February also counted from the New Year's Day in March). As well, all these early years were effectively counted inclusively and positively from a different, much earlier epoch in other eras, such as the supposed foundation of Rome, or the accession to power of a local ruler (and still not relatively to the supposed date of birth of Christ, which was fixed later arbitrarily by a Christian reform for the modern Julian calendar so that this epoch for the Christian era starts now on January 1 in proleptic year AD 1 of the modern Julian calendar, but the real date of birth of Christ is still not known precisely but certainly falls before, somewhere in the last few BC years).

Instructions

For Julian dates before 1300 and after 1999 the year in the table which differs by an exact multiple of 700 years should be used. For Gregorian dates after 2299, the year in the table which differs by an exact multiple of 400 years should be used. The values "r0" through "r6" indicate the remainder when the Hundreds value is divided by 7 (Julian) or 4 (Gregorian), indicating how the series extend in either direction. Both Julian and Gregorian values are shown for years 1500–1999 / 1500–2200 for convenience.

The corresponding numbers in the far right hand column on the same line as each component of the date (the hundreds, remaining digits and month) are added, then the day of the month. This total is divided by 7 and the remainder from this division located in the far right hand column. The day of the week is beside it. Bold figures (e.g., 04) denote leap year. If a year ends in 00 and its hundreds are in bold, it is a leap year. Thus 19 indicates that 1900 is not a Gregorian leap year, (but bold 19 in the Julian column indicates that it is a Julian leap year, as are all Julian x00 years). 20 indicates that 2000 is a leap year. Use bold Jan and Feb only in leap years.

Century digits		Remaining year digits																		Month					Day of week	Number
Julian (r ÷ 7)	Gregorian (r ÷ 4)	Remaining year digits																		Month					Day of week	Number
**r5** **19**	**16** **20** **r0**	(**00**)	06	—	17	23	**28**	34	—	45	51	**56**	62	—	73	79	**84**	90	—	Jan				Oct	Sat	0
**r4** **18**	15 19 r3	01	07	**12**	18	—	29	35	**40**	46	—	57	63	**68**	74	—	85	91	**96**			May			Sun	1
**r3** **17**	—N/a	02	—	13	19	**24**	30	—	41	47	**52**	58	—	69	75	**80**	86	—	97	**Feb**			Aug		Mon	2
**r2** **16**	18 22 r2	03	**08**	14	—	25	31	**36**	42	—	53	59	**64**	70	—	81	87	**92**	98	Feb	Mar			Nov	Tue	3
**r1** **15**	—N/a	—	09	15	**20**	26	—	37	43	**48**	54	—	65	71	**76**	82	—	93	99			Jun			Wed	4
**r0** **14**	17 21 r1	**04**	10	—	21	27	**32**	38	—	49	55	**60**	66	—	77	83	**88**	94	—				Sep	Dec	Thu	5
**r6** **13**	—N/a	05	11	**16**	22	—	33	39	**44**	50	—	61	67	**72**	78	—	89	95	—	**Jan**	Apr	Jul			Fri	6

For determination of the day of the week (January 1, 2000, Saturday)

- the day of the month: 1
- the month: 6
- the year: 0
- the century mod 4 for the Gregorian calendar and mod 7 for the Julian calendar 0
- adding 1 + 6 + 0 + 0 = 7. Dividing by 7 leaves a remainder of 0, so the day of the week is Saturday.

=== Revised Julian calendar ===
- Use the Julian portion of the table of paschal full moons. Use the "week table" (remembering to use the "Julian" side) to find the day of the week on which the paschal full moon falls. Easter is the following Sunday and it is a Julian date. Call this date JD.
- Subtract 100 from the year.
- Divide the result by 100. Call the number obtained (omitting fractions) N.
- Evaluate 7N/9. Call the result (omitting fractions) S.
- The Revised Julian calendar date of Easter is JD + S − 1.

Example. What is the date of Easter in 2017?

2017 + 1 = 2018. 2018 ÷ 19 = 106 remainder 4. Golden number is 4. Date of paschal full moon is April 2 (Julian). From "week table" April 2, 2017 (Julian) is Saturday. JD = April 3. 2017 − 100 = 1917. 1917 ÷ 100 = 19 remainder 17. N = 19. 19 × 7 = 133. 133 ÷ 9 = 14 remainder 7. S = 14. Easter Sunday in the Revised Julian calendar is April 3 + 14 − 1 = April 16.

=== Calculate the day of the week in the Revised Julian calendar ===
Note that the date (and hence the day of the week) in the Revised Julian and Gregorian calendars is the same up until February 28, 2800, and that for large years it may be possible to subtract 6300 or a multiple thereof before starting so as to reach a year within or closer to the table.

To look up the weekday of any date for any year using the table, subtract 100 from the year, divide the number obtained by 100, multiply the resulting quotient (omitting fractions) by seven and divide the product by nine. Note the quotient (omitting fractions). Enter the table with the Julian year, and just before the final division add 50 and subtract the quotient noted above.

Example: What is the day of the week of 27 January 8315?

8315 − 6300 = 2015, 2015 − 100 = 1915, 1915 ÷ 100 = 19 remainder 15, 19 × 7 = 133, 133 ÷ 9 = 14 remainder 7. 2015 is 700 years ahead of 1315, so 1315 is used. From the table: for hundreds (13): 6. For remaining digits (15): 4. For month (January): 0. For date (27): 27. 6 + 4 + 0 + 27 + 50 − 14 = 73. 73 ÷ 7 = 10 remainder 3. Day of week = Tuesday.

=== Dominical letter ===
To find the dominical letter, calculate the day of the week for either January 1 or October 1. If it is Sunday, the Sunday Letter is A, if Saturday B, and similarly backward through the week and forward through the alphabet to Monday, which is G.

Leap years have two letters, so for January and February calculate the day of the week for January 1 and for March to December calculate the day of the week for October 1.

Leap years are all years that divide exactly by four, with the following exceptions:

Gregorian calendar – all years divisible by 100, except those that divide exactly by 400.

Revised Julian calendar – all years divisible by 100, except those with a remainder of 200 or 600 when divided by 900.

== Clerical utility ==
The dominical letter had another practical utility in the period prior to the annual printing of the Ordo divini officii recitandi, in which period, therefore, Christian clergy were often required to determine the Ordo independently. Easter Sunday may be as early as March 22 or as late as April 25, and consequently there are 35 possible days on which it may occur; each dominical letter includes 5 potential dates of these 35, and thus there are 5 possible ecclesiastical calendars for each letter. The Pye or Directorium which preceded the present Ordo took advantage of this principle by delineating all 35 possible calendars and denoting them by the formula "primum A", "secundum A", "tertium A", et cetera. Hence, based on the dominical letter of the year and the epact, the Pye identified the correct calendar to use. A similar table, adapted to the reformed calendar and in more convenient form, is included in the beginning of every breviary and missal under the heading "Tabula Paschalis nova reformata".

Saint Bede does not seem to have been familiar with dominical letters, given his "De temporum ratione"; in its place he adopted a similar device of Greek origin consisting of seven numbers, which he denominated "concurrentes" (De Temp. Rat., Chapter LIII). The "concurrents" are numbers that denote the days of the week on which March 24 occurs in the successive years of the solar cycle, 1 denoting Sunday, 2 (feria secunda) for Monday, 3 for Tuesday, et cetera; these correspond to dominical letters F, E, D, C, B, A, and G, respectively.

== Use for computer calculation ==
Computers are able to calculate the Dominical letter for the first day of a given month in this way (function in C), where:

- m = month
- y = year
- s = "style"; 0 for Julian, otherwise Gregorian.

char dominical(int m, int y, int s) {
  int leap = y % 4 == 0 && (s == 0 || y % 100 != 0 || y % 400 == 0),
      a = (y % 100) % 28,
      b = (s == 0) * (  (y%700)/100 + a/4 * 2  + 4 + ((a%4+1)*!leap + (m+9)/12*leap) * 6 ) % 7
        + (s != 0) * ( ((y%400)/100 + a/4 + 1) * 2 + ((a%4+1)*!leap + (m+9)/12*leap) * 6 ) % 7;
  b += (b == 0) * 7;
  return (char)(b + 64);
}

Years are also given a dominical letter or pair of dominical letters according to the first day in January and last day in December: when they are equal, only the first letter is given. The dominical letter of the last day of December just precedes in the ordered cycle (G, F, E, D, C, B, A), the dominical letter of the first day in January for the next year.

== See also ==
- Determination of the day of the week
- Lectionary#Three-year cycle
- Runic calendar
