= Directorium =

Catholic liturgical guide

Directorium is a Latin term meaning "guide". In the later Middle Ages, it was specifically applied to liturgical guides used for praying the Divine Office and the Holy Mass.

== Early history ==
In the early fifteenth century, Clement Maydeston, likely following foreign precedents, titled his reorganized Sarum Ordinal the Directorium Sacerdotum. As a result, the phrase Directorium Sacerdotum came to appear at the beginning of many books instructing clergy on the form of the Divine Office and Mass to be prayed on each day of the year. Some of these works are among the earliest products of the printing press in England.

The use of the term directorium was not limited to England. A similar work was published at Augsburg in 1501 under the title Index sive Directorium Missarum Horarumque secundum ritum chori Constanciensis diocesis dicendarum, though this was not the earliest example. The title illustrates that a directorium had to be adapted to the needs of a specific diocese or group of dioceses, since each typically had its own particular feasts that had to be taken into account in arranging the Divine Office. Even a single change often caused disruptions by requiring the transfer of coinciding feasts to other days.

From the Directorium Sacerdotum—often referred to in England as the "Pye" and apparently in general use by the time of the invention of printing—there gradually developed the later Directory, formally known as the Ordo Divini Officii recitandi Sacrique peragendi.

== Present use ==
It is customary for every Catholic diocese, or, in cases where the liturgical calendar is substantially identical, for a group of dioceses within the same ecclesiastical province or state, to publish an annual directory, known as the Ordo recitandi, for clerical use. This directory is a calendar that provides, for each day of the year, concise directions for praying the Divine Office and the Mass. It typically also indicates days of fasting, occasions for special indulgences, days of devotion, and other information useful for clergy. The Ordo is issued with the authority of the relevant bishop or bishops and is binding on the clergy within their jurisdiction. Religious orders usually have their own directories, which, in the case of larger orders, often vary by country or region.

For secular clergy, the calendars of the Roman Missal and Roman Breviary—except where special privileges apply—always form the basis of the Ordo recitandi. To this are added the feasts celebrated in the diocese. Because the higher rank of local celebrations can often take precedence over those in the general calendar, some adjustment and transposition of feasts is usually necessary. Additional complexity is introduced by the movable feasts. These elements must be calculated and arranged in advance in accordance with the general rubrics of the Missal and Breviary. Clergy of particular churches must also account for their own patronal or dedication feasts, as well as other modifications required by local practice.

The Ordo is generally published in Latin, though exceptions are sometimes made for directories intended for nuns. As it is often supplemented with diocesan notices, recent decrees of the Congregation of Rites, regulations for praying votive offices, and similar material, the Ordo can acquire a technical and exclusive character.

== Tradition ==
=== England ===
The length of time for which a separate annual Ordo recitandi has been printed for the use of English clergy is uncertain. It is possible that Bishop Challoner, Vicar Apostolic from 1741 to 1781, contributed to its introduction.

In 1759, a Catholic printer in London published A Lay Directory or a Help to Find Out and Assist at Vespers... on Sundays and Holy Days, a translation of the official Directorium (i.e. Ordo) issued for the clergy. Shortly afterwards, another Catholic printer—apparently the publisher of the official Ordo—produced a rival work titled The Laity's Directory or the Order of the (Catholic) Church Service for the Year 1764.

The Laity's Directory was published annually for about three-quarters of a century, gradually increasing in size. In 1837, it was replaced by The Catholic Directory, which has been published in London since 1855 by Messrs. Burns and Lambert, later Burns and Oates. The earliest issues of The Laity's Directory contained only an abbreviated translation of the clerical Ordo recitandi. By the late eighteenth century, however, it included additional material such as lists of Catholic chapels in London, school advertisements, obituary notices, ecclesiastical announcements, and later, an index of the names and addresses of Catholic clergy serving missions in England and Scotland.

This model was later imitated in the Irish Catholic Directory and in The Catholic Directory of the United States. Consequently, Catholic directories came to be associated with address books for churches and clergy, although an examination of the earliest issues of The Laity's Directory shows that the title originally referred only to the liturgical calendar and its instructions for the Mass and the Divine Office.

=== Medieval background ===
During the Middle Ages, and up to the invention of printing, liturgical books were more numerous and divided into multiple volumes. For example, instead of a single volume containing the entire Divine Office, as in the modern Breviary, the Office was spread across at least four books: the Psalterium, Hymnarium, Antiphonarium, and Legendarium (book of lessons).

Rubrics, or ritual directions for the Mass and Divine Office, were rarely written alongside the texts to which they referred. Initially, they were likely communicated orally and later recorded in summary form, as seen in the Ordines Romani edited by Hittorp and Mabillon. Around the eleventh century, rubrical directions became more elaborate and precise, and a distinction emerged between two types of books: the Customary and the Ordinal. The Customary outlined general principles, often focusing on the duties of individuals, while the Ordinal dealt with arrangements that varied from day to day and year to year.

From the Ordinal—also known as the Ordinarium or Liber Ordinarius—the Directorium or Pye, and later the Ordo recitandi, gradually developed.

=== Development of the Ordinal ===
Two stages can be identified in the English and Continental Ordinals.

The first stage, in use from the twelfth to fifteenth centuries, is represented by the Sarum Ordinal (edited by W. H. Frere) and the Ordinaria of Laon (edited by Ulysse Chevalier). These contained detailed information on feasts, the Divine Office, and the Mass, including adjustments necessitated by the movable date of Easter and the shifting of Sundays, as well as incipits of liturgical texts such as lessons and commemorations.

The second stage took the form of adaptations for easier use. In the case of the Sarum Use, Clement Maydeston is closely associated with this development. His Directorium Sacerdotum, or complete Pye (Pica Sarum), was later published in abbreviated editions that could be bound with portions of the Breviary. The Pye provided 35 possible calendar combinations, five for each dominical letter, covering the variations caused by movable and immovable feasts, and thus anticipated the later Ordo recitandi. This system was not unique to England.

=== Continental Europe ===
One of the earliest printed examples was issued around 1475 for the Diocese of Constance. A rubricated copy survives in the British Library. The book, a small folio of 112 leaves, contained a standard calendar followed by summary rules, in 35 sections, for composing the calendar for each year according to the Golden Number and dominical letter. It then provided the Ordo for each of the 35 combinations.

On the continent, such works were generally called Ordinarius and more rarely Directorium Missae. For example, a book printed for the Diocese of Liège in 1492 bore the title:

In nomine Domini Amen... Incipit liber Ordinarius ostendens qualiter legatur et cantetur per totum anni circulum in ecclesia leodiensi tam de tempore quam de festis sanctorum in nocturnis officiis divinis.

Similar books were produced for religious orders, such as the Ordinarius Ordinis Praemonstratensis, which survives in manuscript at Jesus College, Cambridge and in an early printed edition in the British Library.

With the spread of printing, the transition from these comprehensive directories, designed for all possible years, to shorter annual guides of the Ordo recitandi type was a natural development. Since such publications became obsolete after their year of use, many were discarded, making it difficult to determine when the first annual Ordo of this type appeared.

At the Council of Trent (Session 23, De Reformatione, Chapter 18), it was considered necessary to instruct ecclesiastical students in the Computus, enabling them to calculate the Ordo recitandi for each year themselves. This suggests that annual ordines of the later type were not yet in widespread use in the mid-sixteenth century.

== See also ==
- Catholic Directory
