= Zimmer tower =

Tower in Lier, Belgium

Coordinates: 51°07′45″N 4°34′11″E

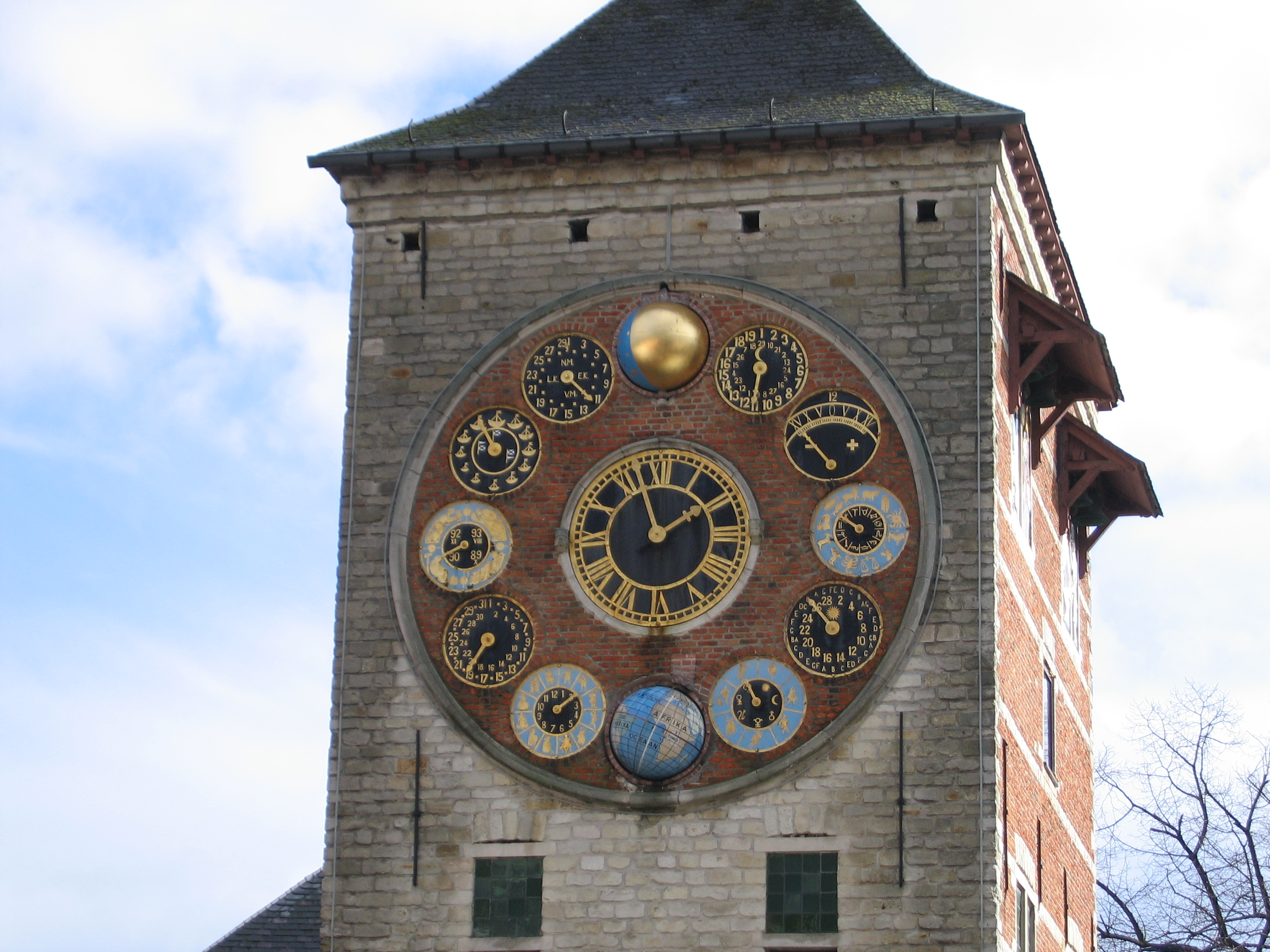
Detail view of the Jubilee clock

The Zimmer tower (Dutch: Zimmertoren) is a tower in Lier, Belgium, also known as the Cornelius tower, that was originally a keep of Lier's 14th-century city fortifications. In 1930, astronomer and clockmaker Louis Zimmer (1888–1970) built the Jubilee (or Centenary) Clock, which is displayed on the front of the tower, and consists of 12 clocks encircling a central one with 57 dials. These clocks showed time on all continents, phases of the Moon, times of tides and many other periodic phenomena.

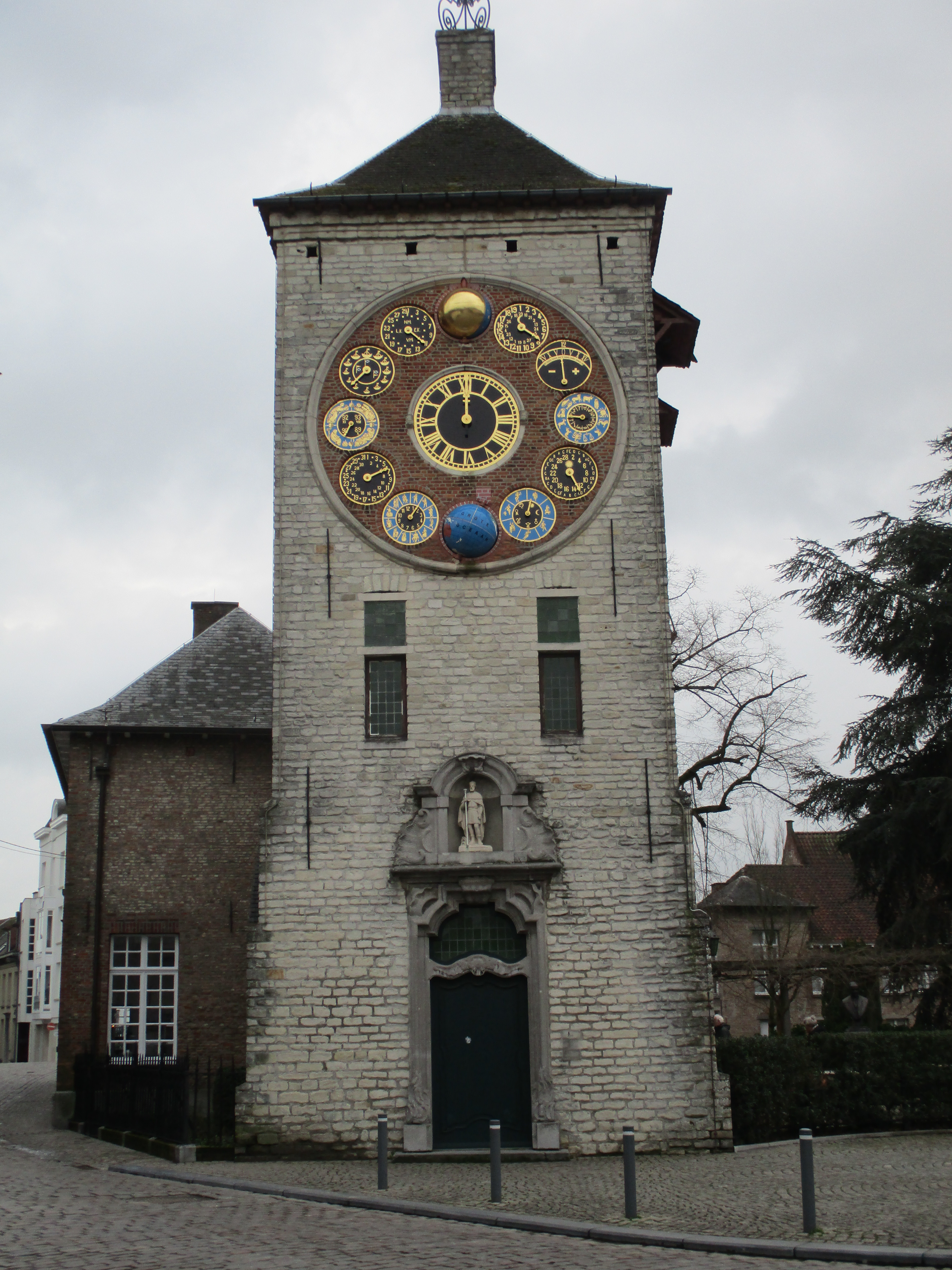
Front side Zimmer tower. A statue of Saint Gummarus, patron saint of Lier, can be seen above the door.

In 1980 the tower became a state-protected monument.

== Tower building ==
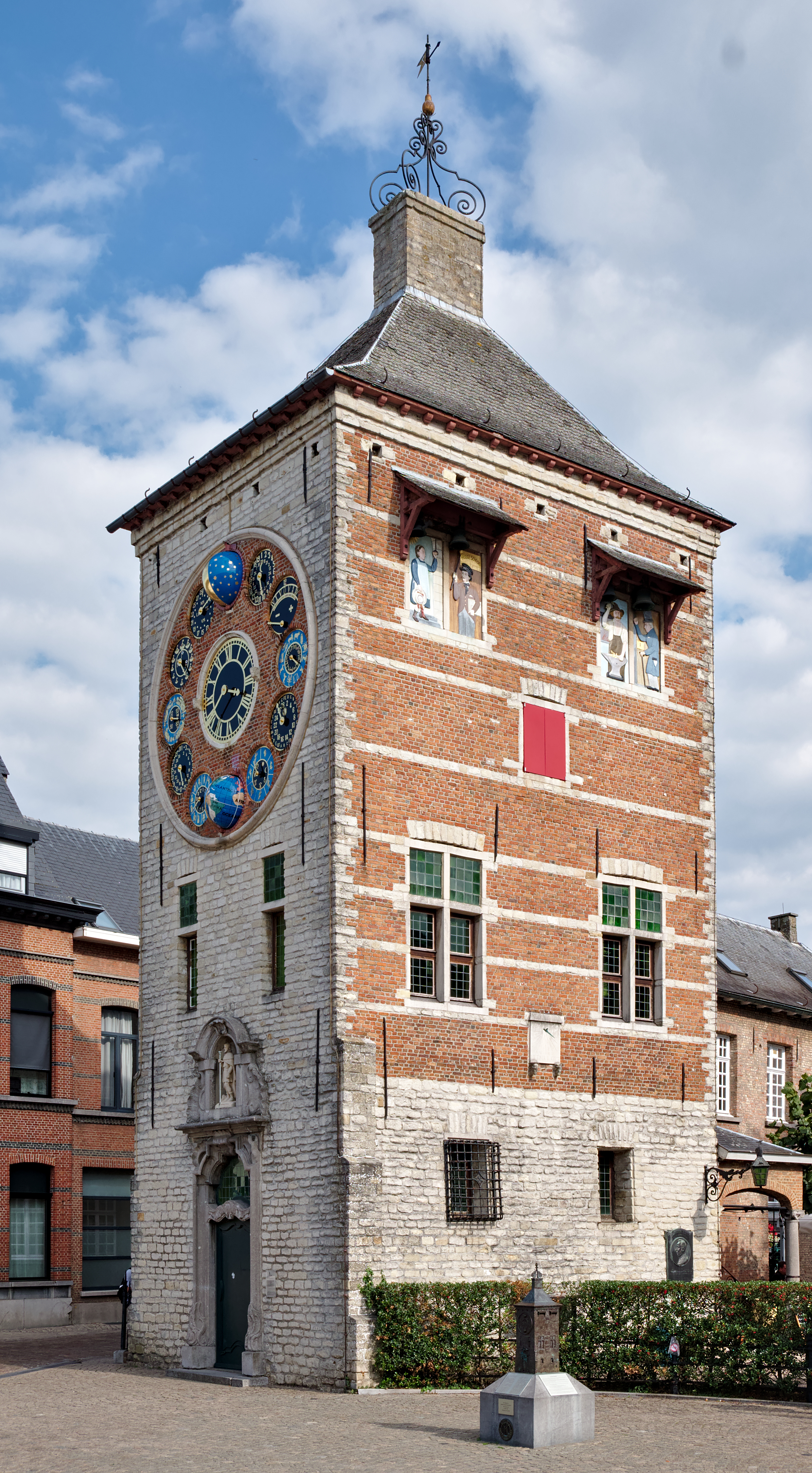
Full view of tower

The original tower was built no later than 1425, though the precise date of construction is unknown. In 1812 the tower was sold by the municipal authorities, but after World War I, they repurchased it and slated it for demolition. In 1930 astronomer and clockmaker Louis Zimmer donated a complex clock which was installed in the old tower, which had to be substantially reconstructed for this. In honor of the astronomer the structure was renamed the Zimmer tower.

In 1960 a pavilion for the new clock was built next to the tower to present Zimmer's masterpiece the wonder-clock. (Dutch: Wonderklok). These wonder-clocks were prepared for the 1935 world exhibition in Brussels; later they were demonstrated in the US. Around one of these dials moves the slowest pointer in the world – its complete revolution will take 25800 years, which corresponds to the period of the precession of the Earth's axis. Subsequently, Zimmer attached to the clocks a mechanical planetarium. The wonder-clocks impressed Albert Einstein, who congratulated Zimmer on the creation of these unusual mechanisms.

On the small square at the foot of the tower an exhibition of the Solar System was arranged with the aid of metallic circles and the rings (circles designate the Sun and planets, rings the orbits of planets). These also show asteroids Felix (№ 1664) and Zimmer (№ 3064), which were named after Felix Timmermans and Louis Zimmer when discovered in 1929, and 1984. In 1980 the tower obtained the status of state protected monument. Now the Zimmer tower and pavilion with the wonder-clocks is a museum.

== Description of the dials ==
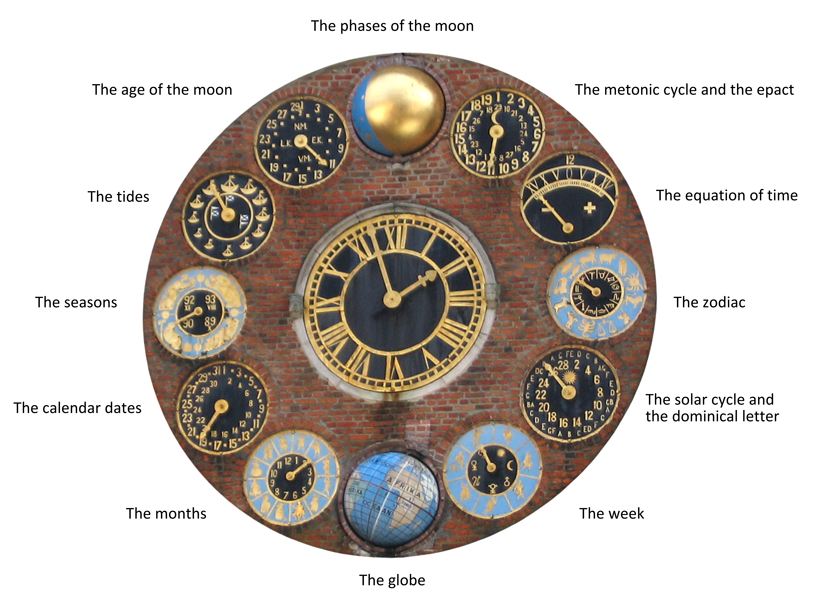
Description of the dials on the Centenary clock

The Centenary clock has one large dial in the centre, measuring 1.5 metres (4 ft 11 in) in diameter. This dial shows the exact time (UTC+1; during daylight saving time UTC+2 is used instead). The twelve dials around the centre dial show the following (starting from the dial in the 2 o'clock position and going clockwise): the equation of time, the zodiac, the solar cycle and the dominical letter, the week, the globe, the months, the calendar dates, the seasons, the tides, the age of the Moon, the phases of the Moon and the Metonic cycle and the epact.

=== The equation of time ===
This dial shows the difference in minutes between the apparent solar time and the mean solar time. Positive values indicate that the apparent solar time is ahead (fast) of the mean solar time, with maxima around 3 November and 14 May. Negative values indicate that the apparent solar time is behind (slow) of the mean solar time, with a maximum lag around 11 February and 26 July.

The difference is zero four times a year; around 15 April, 13 June, 1 September and 25 December.

=== The zodiac ===
Every year the Sun describes an imaginary circle around the Earth, called the zodiac. The zodiac is divided in twelve segments, each denoted by a sign associated with a constellation. This dial shows the zodiac signs. The signs of spring; Ram, Bull and Twins. The signs of the summer; Crab, Lion and Virgin. The signs of the fall; Balance, Scorpion and Bowman. The signs of winter; Capricorn, Water-bearer and Fishes. One revolution of this dial takes a year.

=== The solar cycle and the dominical letter ===
The solar cycle is a 28-year cycle. After the 28 years, dates reappear in the same order. On the inner circle, the hand indicates the current year of the solar cycle. On the outer circle, the hand shows the corresponding dominical letter. The dominical letter gives the day upon which the first Sunday of the year falls. The letter A means that the first Sunday of the year will fall on 1 January, the letter B means that the first Sunday will be on 2 January, etc. Leap years have two dominical letters because the dominical letter changes at the end of February. The first letter covers January and February, the second covers March to December. For leap years, the outer circle shows two dominical letters. The cycle of the dominical letters for common years is twice every 11 years and once every 6 years, while for leap years is once every 28 years. 2008 (leap year starting on Tuesday) is the year 1 of the cycle, while 2007 (common year starting on Monday) is the year 28 of the cycle. From 2008 to 2035, respectively, there will be:

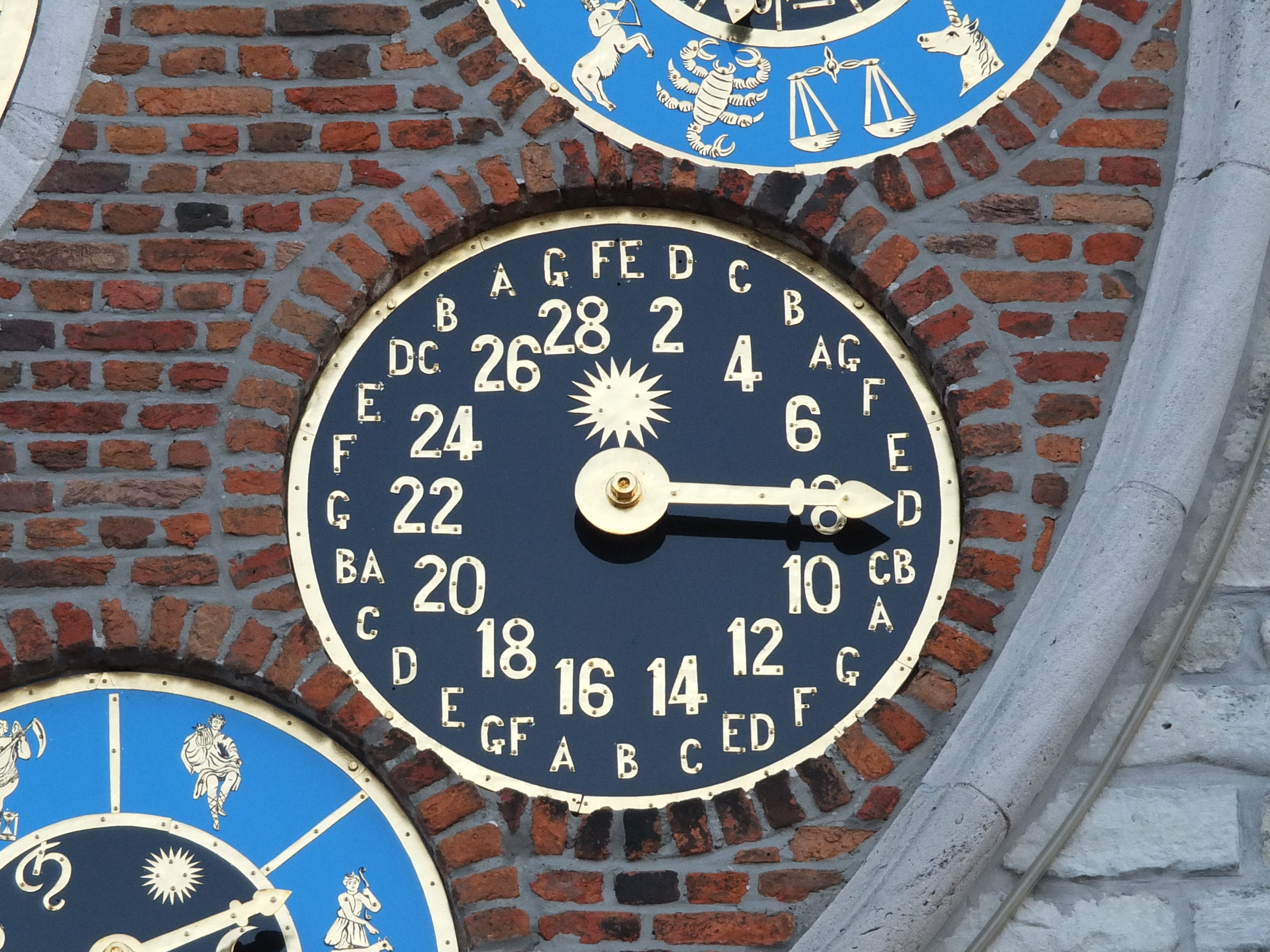
The 28 years and the dominical letters.

- 2008 was a leap year starting on Tuesday, those dominical letters hence were FE, was the year 1 of the cycle.
- 2009 was a common year starting on Thursday, that dominical letter hence was D, was the year 2 of the cycle.
- 2010 was a common year starting on Friday, that dominical letter hence was C, was the year 3 of the cycle.
- 2011 was a common year starting on Saturday, that dominical letter hence was B, was the year 4 of the cycle.
- 2012 was a leap year starting on Sunday, those dominical letters hence were AG, was the year 5 of the cycle.
- 2013 was a common year starting on Tuesday, that dominical letter hence was F, was the year 6 of the cycle.
- 2014 was a common year starting on Wednesday, that dominical letter hence was E, was the year 7 of the cycle.
- 2015 was a common year starting on Thursday, that dominical letter hence was D, was the year 8 of the cycle.
- 2016 was a leap year starting on Friday, those dominical letters hence were CB, was the year 9 of the cycle.
- 2017 was a common year starting on Sunday, that dominical letter hence was A, was the year 10 of the cycle.
- 2018 was a common year starting on Monday, that dominical letter hence was G, was the year 11 of the cycle.
- 2019 was a common year starting on Tuesday, that dominical letter hence was F, was the year 12 of the cycle.
- 2020 was a leap year starting on Wednesday, those dominical letters hence were ED, was the year 13 of the cycle.
- 2021 was a common year starting on Friday, that dominical letter hence was C, was the year 14 of the cycle.
- 2022 was a common year starting on Saturday, that dominical letter hence was B, was the year 15 of the cycle.
- 2023 was a common year starting on Sunday, that dominical letter hence was A, was the year 16 of the cycle.
- 2024 was a leap year starting on Monday, those dominical letters hence were GF, was the year 17 of the cycle.
- 2025 was a common year starting on Wednesday, that dominical letter hence was E, was the year 18 of the cycle.
- 2026 is a common year starting on Thursday, that dominical letter hence is D, is the year 19 of the cycle.
- 2027 will be a common year starting on Friday, that dominical letter hence will be C, will be the year 20 of the cycle.
- 2028 will be a leap year starting on Saturday, those dominical letters hence will be BA, will be the year 21 of the cycle.
- 2029 will be a common year starting on Monday, that dominical letter hence will be G, will be the year 22 of the cycle.
- 2030 will be a common year starting on Tuesday, that dominical letter hence will be F, will be the year 23 of the cycle.
- 2031 will be a common year starting on Wednesday, that dominical letter hence will be E, will be the year 24 of the cycle.
- 2032 will be a leap year starting on Thursday, those dominical letters hence will be DC, will be the year 25 of the cycle.
- 2033 will be a common year starting on Saturday, that dominical letter hence will be B, will be the year 26 of the cycle.
- 2034 will be a common year starting on Sunday, that dominical letter hence will be A, will be the year 27 of the cycle.
- 2035 will be a common year starting on Monday, that dominical letter hence will be G, will be the year 28 and final year of the cycle.

The inscription will have to be altered in 2100, as that year will not be a leap year.

=== The week ===
This dial marks the seven days of the week, represented by ancient gods and their symbol. The hand shows the current day of the week. One revolution takes a week.

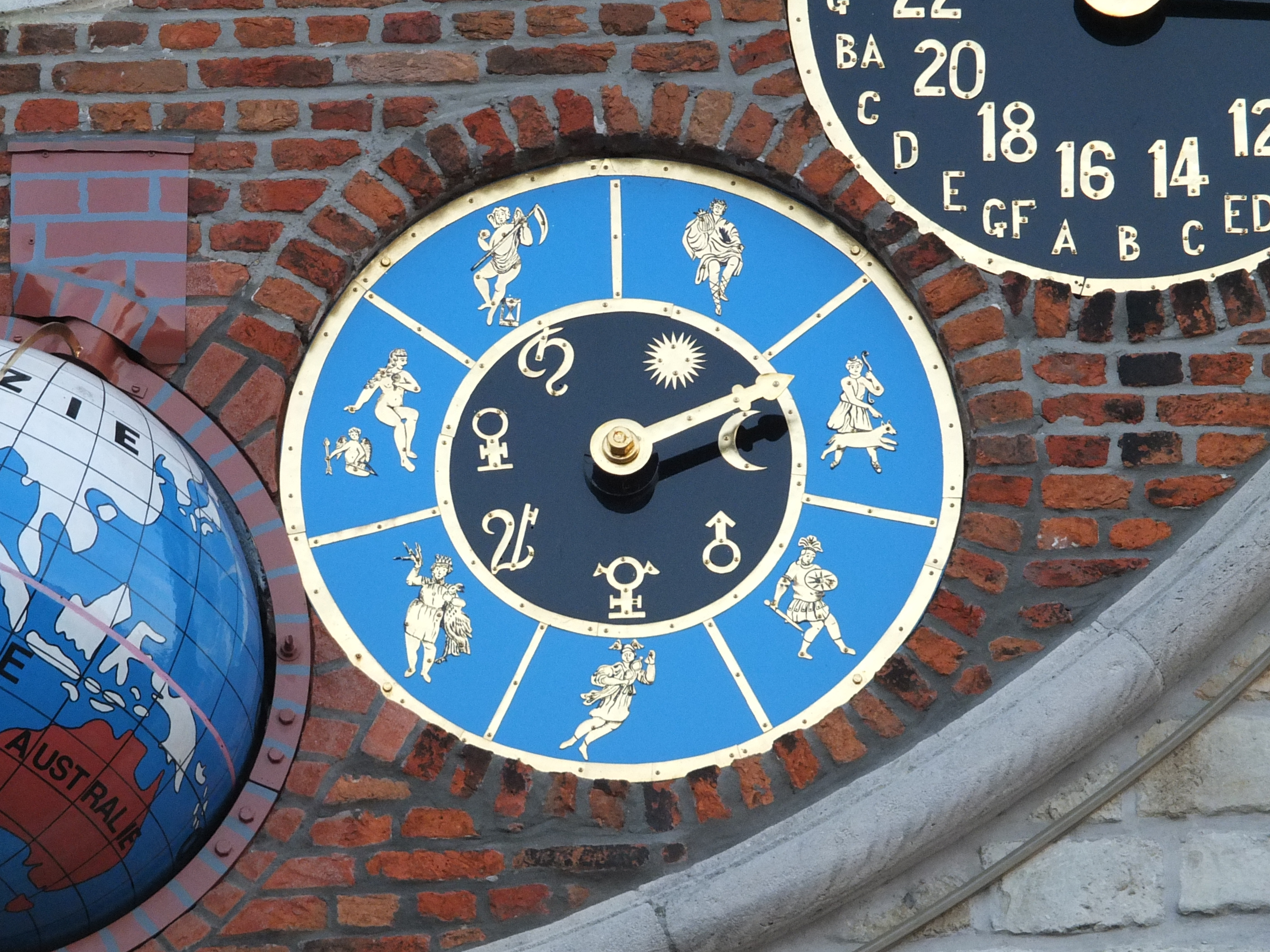
The 7 days and their figures.

Day	God	Symbol
Sunday	Apollo	Sun
Monday	Diana	Moon
Tuesday	Mars	lance
Wednesday	Mercurius	golden staff
Thursday	Jupiter	flash of lightning
Friday	Venus	mirror
Saturday	Saturn	sickle and scythe

=== The globe ===
The rotation of the Earth causes day and night. It is day on the part of the globe that is currently visible. The places on Earth that pass under the fixed meridian (the golden belt running from the North Pole to the South Pole) have noon at the same time. The globe rotates once every 24 hours.

=== The months ===
This dial depicts the twelve months. The hand shows the current month. One revolution takes a year. Each month also has a human figure illustrating traditional tasks or activities of that month.

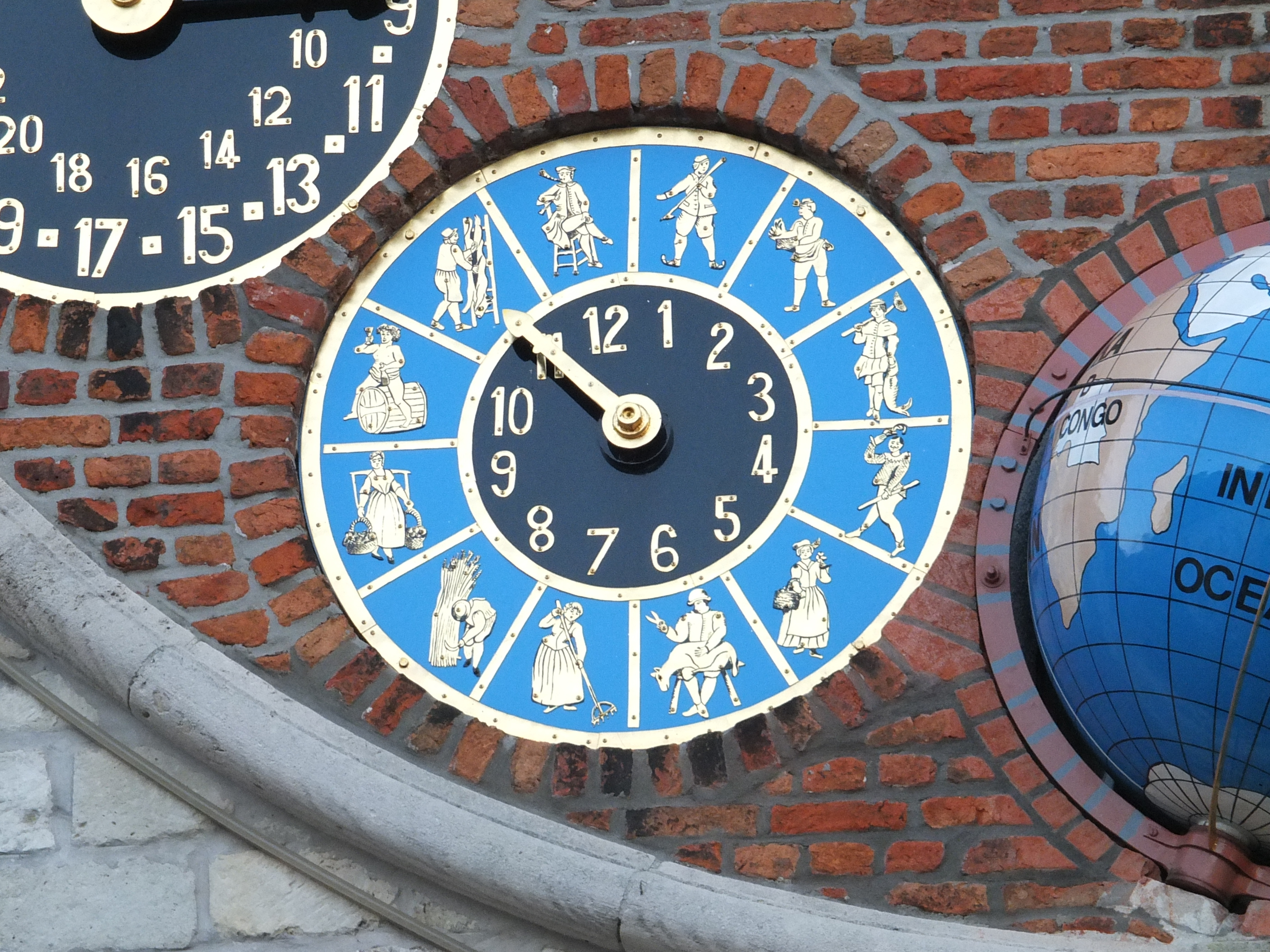
The 12 months and their figures.

Number	Month	Alternative name	Days
1	January	Ice-month	31
2	February	Duck-month	28 (29 days in leap years)
3	March	Fish-month	31
4	April	Harlequin-month	30
5	May	Flower-month	31
6	June	Shearing-month	30
7	July	Hay-month	31
8	August	Harvest-month	31
9	September	Fruit-month	30
10	October	Wine-month	31
11	November	Slaughter-month	30
12	December	Resting-month	31

=== The calendar dates ===
This dial shows the exact date. The numbering goes to 31, the maximum number of days in a month. In months that have fewer days (28, 29 or 30), the hand automatically moves forward to the first day of the following month. The months with 31 days are January, March, May, July, August, October and December, the months with 30 days are April, June, September and November. February is the only month with less than 30 days. February has only 28 days (29 days in leap years). One revolution of this dial takes a month.

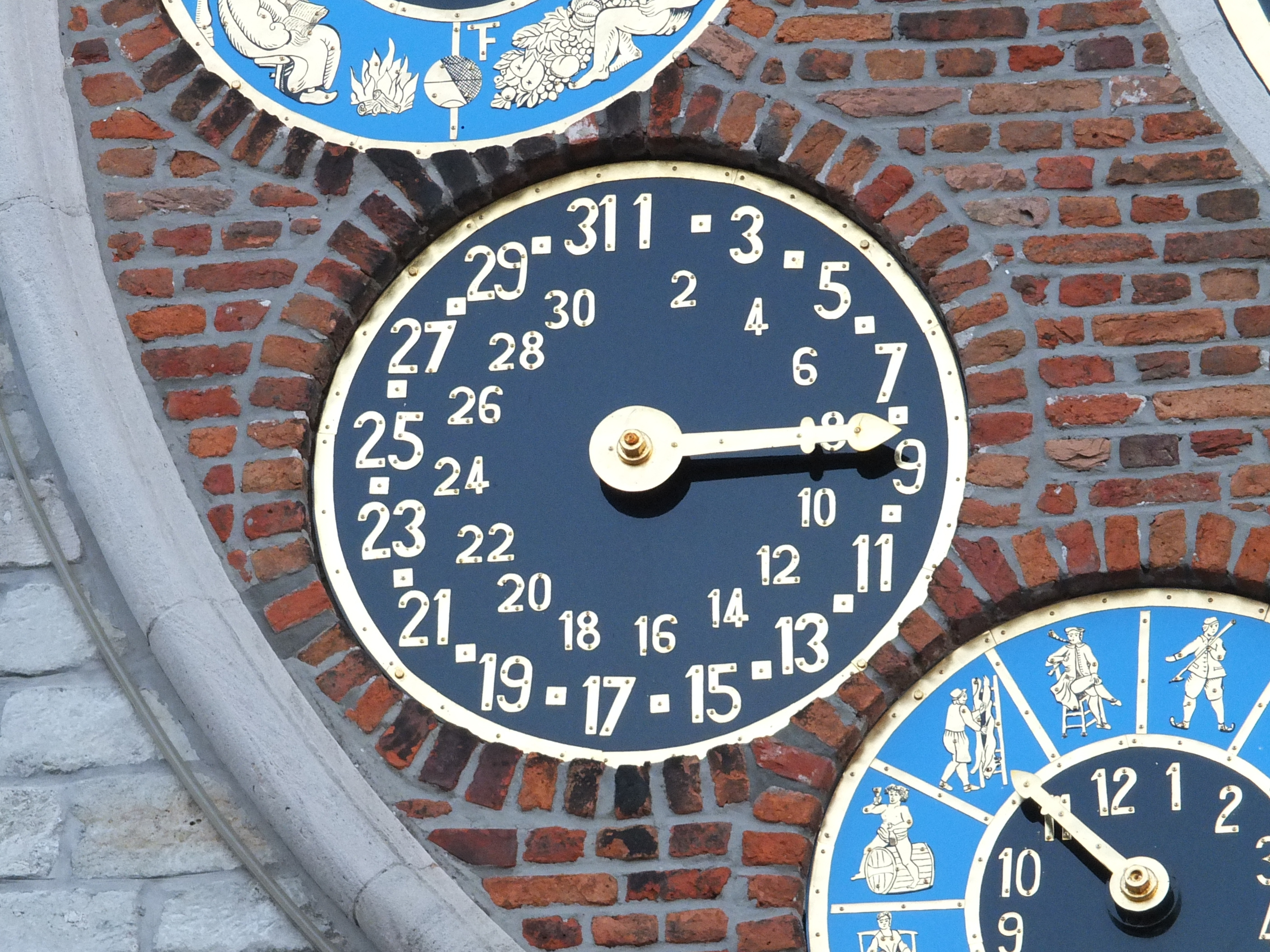
The days of the month, numbered from 1 to 31.

=== The seasons ===
The dial shows four drawings by Felix Timmermans, representing the four temperate seasons. Spring is represented by a child with flowers (upper left). The duration of the season is indicated with Arabic numerals for the days and Roman numerals for the hours. Spring lasts for 92 days and 11 hours. The summer is represented by a mower and lasts 93 days and 8 hours. Autumn is symbolised by a cornucopia and lasts 89 days and 10 hours. Winter is represented by an old woman reading by the fireside. The duration of the winter is exactly 90 days.

On the dividing lines between the drawings is a small globe indicating the part of the globe that is being lit by the Sun at the start of the season. The differences in illumination during the year are caused by the Earth's axial tilt. The hand completes one revolution a year and shows the current season.

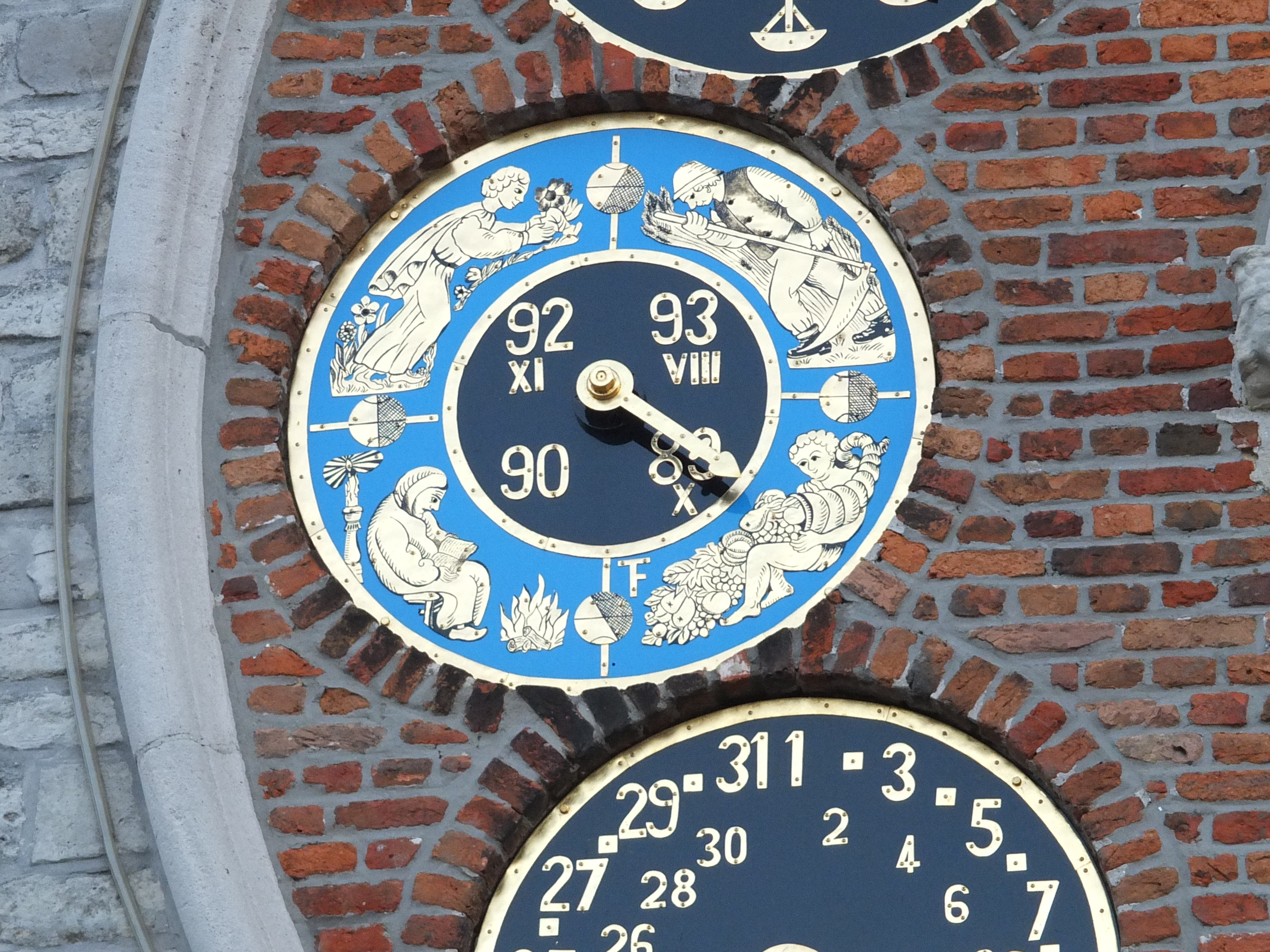
The seasons of the year. The June Solstice (Summer Solstice) is at up, the December Solstice (Winter Solstice) is at down, and the Equinoxes are in right and left, representing September and March Equinox respectively.

=== The tides ===
The dial indicates the tides at Lier, Belgium. The biggest ship and the flag without the streamer indicate high water. When the streamer is above the flag it is flood. It is ebb when the streamer is below the flag. At Lier, the water is rising for 3 hours and 53 minutes and falling in the other hours. This dial completes a full circle every 12 hours and 25 minutes (half of a tidal lunar day).

=== The age of the Moon ===
Animation of the Moon as it cycles through its phases. The apparent wobbling of the Moon is known as libration.

The time between two full Moons is about 29 days, 12 hours, 44 minutes and 3 seconds. This is the time it takes the Moon to make one orbit around the Earth and line up with the Sun again. The dial shows how many days passed since last New Moon, indicating the day in the cycle of the Moon and showing on the inner circumference the phases of New Moon (Dutch: Nieuwe Maan, N.M.), First Quarter (Eerste Kwartier, E.K.), Full Moon (Volle Maan, V.M.) and Last Quarter (Laatste Kwartier, L.K.).

=== The phases of the Moon ===
This globe, colored half-gold and half-blue with golden stars, shows the phases of the Moon. The golden part represents the visible part of the Moon.

=== The Metonic cycle and the epact ===
The hand on this dial revolves once in 19 years. After this period, the different phases of the Moon will fall again on the same dates in the year. The Greek astronomer Meton discovered this in 432 BC. On the outer ring, the hand points to the golden number, or the number of the current year in the Metonic cycle. The inner ring shows the epact, which is the age of the Moon on the first of January of the current year. In each cycle of 19 years, there are 7 intercalary months (every 2 or 3 years, depending on the position).

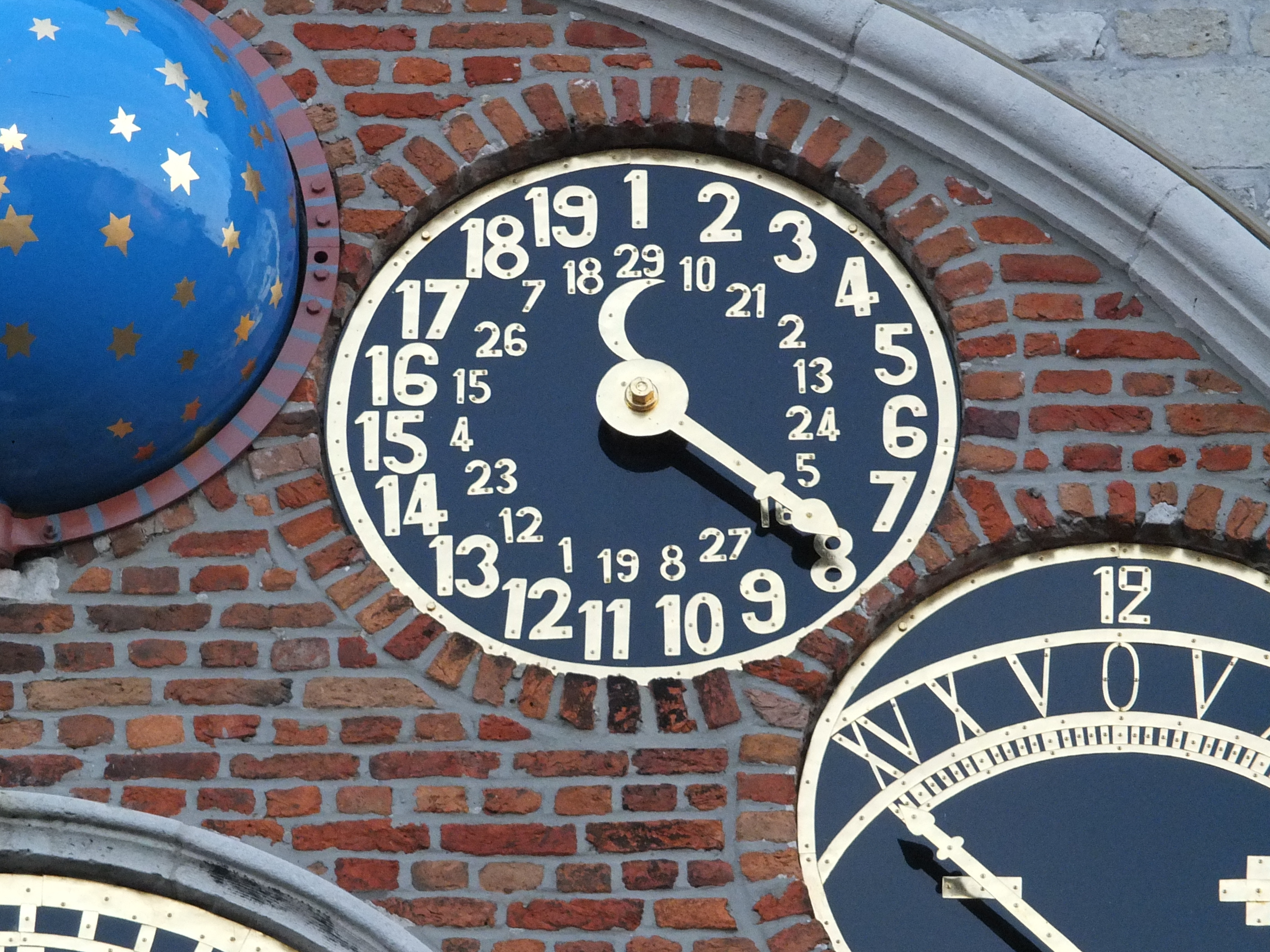
The 19 years of the Metonic Cycle and the Epacts.
