= Ecclesiastical new moon =

An ecclesiastical new moon is the first day of a lunar month (an ecclesiastical moon) in an ecclesiastical lunar calendar. Such months have a whole number of days, 29 or 30, whereas true synodic months can vary from about 29.27 to 29.83 days in length. Medieval authors equated the ecclesiastical new moon with a new crescent moon, but it is not a phase of the true moon. If the ecclesiastical lunar calendar is accurate, the ecclesiastical new moon can be any day from the day of the astronomical new moon or dark moon to two days later (see table). The ecclesiastical calendar valid for the Julian and Gregorian calendar are described in detail by Grotefend, Ginzel and in the Explanatory Supplement to The Astronomical Ephemeris.

The ecclesiastical new moon which falls on or next after March 8 is of special importance, since it is the paschal new moon that begins the paschal lunar month (see table). The fourteenth day of the same lunar month is the first of the calendar year to occur on or next after March 21. This fourteenth day was called the paschal full moon by medieval computists. Easter is the following Sunday.

Calendar pages in medieval liturgical books indicated the ecclesiastical new moons by writing the Golden Number to the left of the day of the month on which the ecclesiastical new moon would occur in the year of that Golden Number. In some places the age of the moon was announced daily in the office of Prime at the reading of the martyrology.

When in the 13th century Roger Bacon complained about the discrepancy between the ecclesiastical moon and the observed lunar phases, he specifically mentioned the discrepancy involving the ecclesiastical new moon

Quilibet computista novit quod fallit primatio per tres dies vel quatuor his temporibus; et quilibet rusticus potest in coelo hunc errorem contemplari. (Any computist knows that the prime [of the moon] is off by three or four days in our time; and any rustic can see this error in the sky.)

These complaints were finally addressed by the construction of the Gregorian calendar.

A check can be made on the difference between the astronomical new moon and the ecclesiastical new moon. The following table gives a comparison for 2010. All times are Greenwich Mean Time. Coordinated Universal Time is the same with a tolerance of 0.9 seconds either way.

| New moon in 2010 | Ecclesiastical new moon, 2010 |
|---|---|
| January 15 07h | January 17 |
| February 14 03h | February 15 |
| March 15 21h | March 17 |
| April 14 12h | April 15 |
| May 14 01h | May 15 |
| June 12 11h | June 13 |
| July 11 20h | July 13 |
| August 10 03h | August 11 |
| September 8 10h | September 10 |
| October 7 19h | October 9 |
| November 6 05h | November 8 |
| December 5 18h | December 7 |

The long term accuracy of the Gregorian ecclesiastical lunar calendar is remarkable. It will be in error by one day in about 73 500 years while the error with respect to the tropical year will be one day in about 3320 years.

The following table gives the ecclesiastical new moon used for determining Easter (in the Gregorian system) for a range of years.

| Year | Gregorian paschal new moon | Days in paschal lunar month |
|---|---|---|
| 2014 | April 1 | 29 |
| 2015 | March 21 | 29 |
| 2016 | March 10 | 29 |
| 2017 | March 29 | 29 |
| 2018 | March 18 | 29 |
| 2019 | April 5 | 30 |
| 2020 | March 26 | 29 |
| 2021 | March 15 | 29 |
| 2022 | April 3 | 29 |
| 2023 | March 23 | 29 |
| 2024 | March 12 | 29 |
| 2025 | March 31 | 29 |
| 2026 | March 20 | 29 |
| 2027 | March 9 | 29 |
| 2028 | March 28 | 29 |
| 2029 | March 17 | 29 |
| 2030 | April 4 | 30 |
| 2031 | March 25 | 29 |
| 2032 | March 14 | 29 |

== Determining the age of the eccesiastical moon ==
In the liturgical books of the Catholic Church, the age of the moon (defined as the time elapsed since the last new moon) is determined by using tabular methods. For explicit calculations of the age of the ecclesiastical moon, a convenient formula has been derived by H. Fukś.

For a given day $d$ of the month $m$ and the year $y$, define the century number $C_y$, the golden number $G_y$, the epact $E_y$ and the day number $N_{m,d}$, respectively as follows,

$$\begin{align}
C_y&=\lfloor y/100 \rfloor +1,\\
G_y&=y \mod 19 +1,\\
E_y&=11 G_y -\left\lfloor \frac{3 C_y}{4}
\right\rfloor  +
\left\lfloor \frac{ 8C_y+5}{25}\right\rfloor +27 \mod 30,\\
N_{m,d}&=d-1 + 30(m-1)+\left\lfloor \frac{7m-2}{12}\right\rfloor
-2 \left\lfloor \frac{m+9}{12}\right\rfloor.
\end{align}$$

Then the age of the ecclesiastical moon $A_{y,m,d}$ on that day is given by

$A_{y,m,d} = \left\{ \begin{array}{ll} g(E_y+N_{m,d}) & \text{if } E_y < 25 \text{ or } (E_y = 25 \text{ and } G_y \geq 12), \\ g(E_y+N_{m,d}+29) + \mathbf{1}_{N_{m,d}+E_y<30} & \text{otherwise,} \end{array} \right.$

where

$g(x) = \left( x + \left\lfloor \frac{x}{59} \right\rfloor \right) \mod 30 \,\,\,\, + 1.$

and

$\mathbf{1}_{P} = \left\{ \begin{array}{ll} 1 & \text{if } P \text{ is true}, \\ 0 & \text{otherwise.} \end{array} \right.$

This formula reflects the age of the moon as given in tables of Martyrologium Romanum. On some years with golden number 1 these tables give incorrect results in the first cycle of January. Liturgical books stipulate that in such cases the appropriate correction should be applied, and this is called `"pronounced age of the moon", defined as

$A_{y,m,d}^{pron} = \left\{ \begin{array}{ll} A_{y,m,d}-1 & \text{if } G_y = 1, E_y > 0, m = 1 \text{ and } d + E_y \leq 30, \\ A_{y,m,d} & \text{otherwise.} \end{array} \right.$

Even with the above correction, the formula is only applicable until the year 16399. Afterwards, another correction needs to be applied because further anomalies may appear. A fully corrected formula for the age of ecclesiastical moon, eliminating all known anomalies, has been proposed by H. Fukś as well:

$$\begin{align}
J_y &= (E_y - E_{y-1}) \, \text{mod}\, 30 - 11, \\
A_{y,m,d}^{corr} &= \left\{
\begin{array}{ll}
A_{y,m,d} - J_y + 30 \cdot \mathbf{1}_{A_{y,m,d} - J_y \leq 0} & \text{if } m = 1 \text{ and } d + E_y \leq 30, \\
A_{y,m,d} & \text{otherwise.}
\end{array}
\right.
\end{align}$$

Python implementation of all of these formulas is available.
