= Golden number =

Golden number may mean:

- Golden number (time), a number assigned to a calendar year denoting its place in a Metonic cycle
- Golden ratio, an irrational mathematical constant with special properties in arts and mathematics
  - Fibonacci number, a sequence of numbers which converges on the golden ratio
