= Coptic Epact Numbers =

Old Coptic number forms in Unicode

- Range: U+102E0..U+102FF (32 code points)
- Plane: SMP
- Scripts: Common (27 char.); Inherited (1 char.)
- Symbol sets: Number forms
- Assigned: 28 code points
- Unused: 4 reserved code points

Unicode Version History
- 7.0 (2014): 28 (+28)

Unicode documentation
- Code chart ∣ Web page

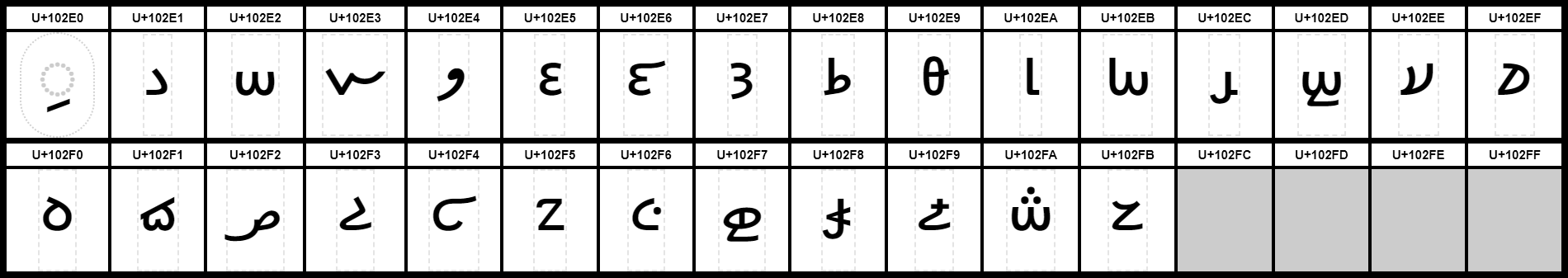
Graphical representation of the Coptic Epact Numbers Unicode block

Coptic Epact Numbers is a Unicode block containing Old Coptic number forms. These numbers were used in some regions instead of letters of the Coptic alphabet that were used for encoding numbers, as was common in much of the world at the time, like Roman numerals. It was used most extensively in the Bohairic dialect of the Coptic language that became the liturgical language of Egyptian Christians.

The Unicode block contains separate characters for each of the digits, 1-9 (0 was not indicated), each of the tens numbers from 10-90, and each of the hundreds numbers from 100-900. These numbers were composed from left-to-right by successively adding the values that each character or digit represented. There is a thousand mark diacritic that multiplies the digit by one thousand (so 5 with thousand mark represents 5,000, 900 with thousand mark indicates 900,000). Two of the thousands marks together (visually similar to a tanween al-kasra in Arabic) represents a million in a similar fashion, and mirrors other Coptic conventions of indicating higher orders by repetition of marks.

== Block ==
Coptic Epact Numbers^{[1]}^{[2]} Official Unicode Consortium code chart (PDF)
	0	1	2	3	4	5	6	7	8	9	A	B	C	D	E	F
U+102Ex	𐋠	𐋡	𐋢	𐋣	𐋤	𐋥	𐋦	𐋧	𐋨	𐋩	𐋪	𐋫	𐋬	𐋭	𐋮	𐋯
U+102Fx	𐋰	𐋱	𐋲	𐋳	𐋴	𐋵	𐋶	𐋷	𐋸	𐋹	𐋺	𐋻				
Notes 1.As of Unicode version 17.0 2.Grey areas indicate non-assigned code points

== History ==
The following Unicode-related documents record the purpose and process of defining specific characters in the Coptic Epact Numbers block:

Version	Final code points (Note: Proposed code points and characters names may differ from final code points and names)	Count	L2 ID	WG2 ID	Document
7.0	U+102E0..102FB	28	L2/09-163R		Pandey, Anshuman (2009-09-15), Proposal to Encode Coptic Numerals in ISO/IEC 10646
7.0	U+102E0..102FB	28	L2/10-114	N3786	Pandey, Anshuman (2010-04-10), Towards an Encoding for Coptic Numbers in the UCS
7.0	U+102E0..102FB	28	L2/10-108		Moore, Lisa (2010-05-19), "C.8.1", UTC #123 / L2 #220 Minutes
7.0	U+102E0..102FB	28	L2/10-206R	N3843R	Pandey, Anshuman (2010-06-21), Final Proposal to Encode Coptic Numbers
7.0	U+102E0..102FB	28	L2/10-333	N3886	Everson, Michael; Emmel, Stephen (2010-09-08), Towards the encoding of a complete set of Coptic numbers
7.0	U+102E0..102FB	28	L2/10-421R	N3958R	Pandey, Anshuman (2010-11-01), Request to Rename 'Coptic Numbers' to 'Coptic Epact Numerals'
7.0	U+102E0..102FB	28	L2/10-416R		Moore, Lisa (2010-11-09), "Consensus 125-C9", UTC #125 / L2 #222 Minutes, "Change the block name (for U+102E0 - U+102FF) from "Coptic Numbers" to "Coptic Epact Numbers" and the character names from "Coptic..." to "Coptic Epact..." for range U+102E0 - U+102FF."
7.0	U+102E0..102FB	28	L2/11-035		Lazrek, Azzeddine (2011-01-08), Opposition about encode Coptic Epact numeral system
7.0	U+102E0..102FB	28	L2/11-065		Anderson, Deborah (2011-02-09), Comparison of Coptic Epact vs. Rumi digits
7.0	U+102E0..102FB	28	L2/11-062R	N3990	Pandey, Anshuman (2011-02-14), Final Proposal to Encode Coptic Epact Numbers
7.0	U+102E0..102FB	28	L2/11-016		Moore, Lisa (2011-02-15), "C.16.1", UTC #126 / L2 #223 Minutes
7.0	U+102E0..102FB	28		N3903 (pdf, doc)	"M57.16", Unconfirmed minutes of WG2 meeting 57, 2011-03-31
7.0	U+102E0..102FB	28		N4103	"T.2. Coptic Numbers", Unconfirmed minutes of WG 2 meeting 58, 2012-01-03

== See also ==
- Epact – Age of a phase of the moon in days, and method
- Rumi Numeral Symbols
