= Rumi Numeral Symbols =

- Range: U+10E60..U+10E7F (32 code points)
- Plane: SMP
- Scripts: Arabic
- Symbol sets: Rumi numbers
- Assigned: 31 code points
- Unused: 1 reserved code points

Unicode Version History
- 5.2 (2009): 31 (+31)

Unicode documentation
- Code chart ∣ Web page

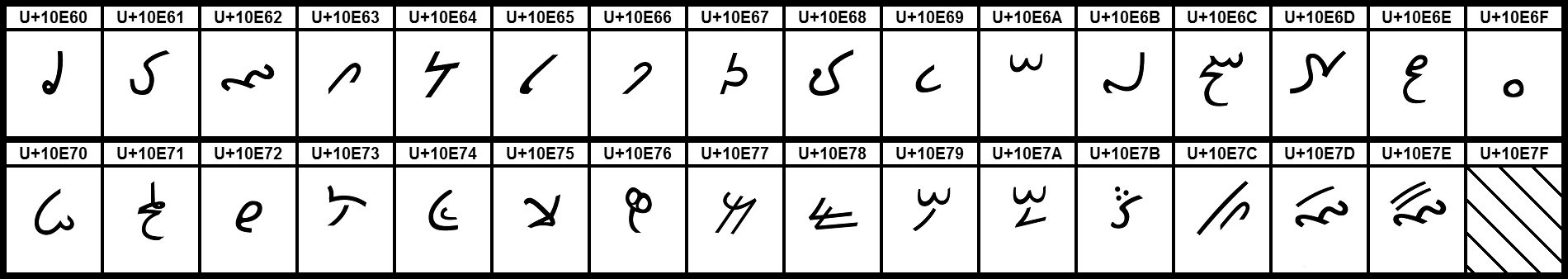
Graphical representation of the Rumi Numeral Symbols Unicode block

Rumi Numeral Symbols (Arabic: الأرقام الرومية), also called Fez Numeral Symbols (Arabic: الأرقام الفاسية), are a system of Arabic-Indian numerals used in Fez, Morocco, and elsewhere in North Africa and the Iberian peninsula between the tenth and seventeenth centuries.

== Block ==
Rumi Numeral Symbols^{[1]}^{[2]} Official Unicode Consortium code chart (PDF)
	0	1	2	3	4	5	6	7	8	9	A	B	C	D	E	F
U+10E6x	𐹠	𐹡	𐹢	𐹣	𐹤	𐹥	𐹦	𐹧	𐹨	𐹩	𐹪	𐹫	𐹬	𐹭	𐹮	𐹯
U+10E7x	𐹰	𐹱	𐹲	𐹳	𐹴	𐹵	𐹶	𐹷	𐹸	𐹹	𐹺	𐹻	𐹼	𐹽	𐹾	
Notes 1.As of Unicode version 17.0 2.Grey area indicates non-assigned code point

== History ==
The following Unicode-related documents record the purpose and process of defining specific characters in the Rumi Numeral Symbols block:

Version	Final code points (Note: Proposed code points and characters names may differ from final code points and names)	Count	L2 ID	WG2 ID	Document
5.2	U+10E60..10E7E	31	L2/05-318		Lazrek, Azzeddine (2005-10-24), Proposals for Unicode Consortium [Arabic mathematical symbols]
5.2	U+10E60..10E7E	31	L2/05-321		Lazrek, Azzeddine (2005-07-10), Arabic Mathematical Old Symbols, Additional characters proposed to Unicode
5.2	U+10E60..10E7E	31	L2/06-126	N3087-1, N3087	Lazrek, Azzeddine (2006-03-30), Rumi Numeral System Symbols
5.2	U+10E60..10E7E	31	L2/06-128	N3089 (pdf, doc)	Lazrek, Azzeddine (2006-03-31), Rumi bibliography
5.2	U+10E60..10E7E	31	L2/06-216		Anderson, Deborah (2006-05-17), Feedback on L2/06-126 Rumi
5.2	U+10E60..10E7E	31	L2/06-291		Lazrek, Azzeddine (2006-08-05), Rumi Numeral System Symbols, Additional characters proposed to Unicode
5.2	U+10E60..10E7E	31		N3103 (pdf, doc)	Umamaheswaran, V. S. (2006-08-25), "8.14", Unconfirmed minutes of WG 2 meeting 48, Mountain View, CA, USA; 2006-04-24/27
5.2	U+10E60..10E7E	31	L2/07-155		Anderson, Deborah; Maymo, Rosa Maria Comes; Lazrek, Azzeddine (2007-05-05), Feedback on Rumi proposal L2/06-126
5.2	U+10E60..10E7E	31	L2/07-235		Lazrek, Azzeddine (2007-07-29), Character and line-breaking properties for Rumi Numeral Symbols (proposal L2/06-291)
5.2	U+10E60..10E7E	31	L2/08-003		Moore, Lisa (2008-02-14), "Rumi Numeral Symbols", UTC #114 Minutes
5.2	U+10E60..10E7E	31	L2/08-140	N3430	Lazrek, Azzeddine (2008-04-08), Rumi Numeral System Symbols
5.2	U+10E60..10E7E	31	L2/08-318	N3453 (pdf, doc)	Umamaheswaran, V. S. (2008-08-13), "M52.12", Unconfirmed minutes of WG 2 meeting 52
5.2	U+10E60..10E7E	31	L2/08-161R2		Moore, Lisa (2008-11-05), "Consensus 115-C16", UTC #115 Minutes, "Approve "Rumi Numeral Symbols" as the block name for Rumi."
5.2	U+10E60..10E7E	31	L2/09-174		Pournader, Roozbeh (2009-04-29), Possibly incorrect Bidi Class for Rumi numerals
5.2	U+10E60..10E7E	31	L2/09-271		Anderson, Deborah (2009-08-03), Rumi numerals : bidi property
5.2	U+10E60..10E7E	31	L2/09-225R		Moore, Lisa (2009-08-17), "B.13.7", UTC #120 / L2 #217 Minutes
5.2	U+10E60..10E7E	31	L2/11-065		Anderson, Deborah (2011-02-09), Comparison of Coptic Epact vs. Rumi digits

== See also ==
- Coptic Epact Numbers
