= Ecclesiastical full moon =

14th day of the ecclesiastical lunar month

An ecclesiastical full moon is formally the 14th day of the ecclesiastical lunar month in an ecclesiastical lunar calendar. The ecclesiastical lunar calendar spans the year with lunar months of 30 and 29 days which are intended to approximate the observed phases of the Moon. Since a true synodic month has a length that can vary from about 29.27 to 29.83 days, the moment of astronomical opposition tends to be roughly 14.75 days after the previous conjunction of the Sun and Moon (the new moon). The ecclesiastical full moons of the lunar reckoning tend to agree with the (Gregorian calendar) dates of astronomical opposition, referred to a day beginning at midnight at 0° longitude, to within a day or so. However, the astronomical opposition happens at a single moment for the entire Earth: the hour and day at which the opposition is measured as having taken place will vary with longitude. In the ecclesiastical calendar, the 14th day of the lunar month, reckoned in local time, is considered the day of the ecclesiastical full moon at each longitude.

Beginning in medieval times, the age of the ecclesiastical moon was announced daily at the canonical hour of Prime during the reading of the martyrology. This was still done by Roman Catholics using the extraordinary form of the Roman Rite (according to the 1962 Roman Breviary).

== Paschal full moon ==
The paschal full moon is the particular 'ecclesiastical full moon' that is used in the calculation of the date of Easter. The name paschal is derived from Pascha, a transliteration of the Aramaic word meaning Passover. This 'paschal full moon' is the one that falls on or after March 21. (March 21 is the ecclesiastical equinox, the date fixed by the Gregorian reform of the calendar as a fixed reference date for the March equinox in the Northern hemisphere; the actual Equinox can fall on March 19, 20 or 21). The date of Easter is determined as the first Sunday after that specific full moon. This "full moon" does not necessarily correspond directly to any astronomical event, but is instead the 14th day of a lunar month, determined from tables. It may differ from the date of the actual full moon by up to two or even three days.

The calculations to determine the date of the paschal full moon can be described as follows:

- Nineteen civil calendar years are divided into 235 lunar months of 30 and 29 days each.
- This period of 19 years (the metonic cycle) is used because it produces a set of civil calendar dates for the ecclesiastical moons that repeats every nineteen years while still providing a reasonable approximation to the astronomical facts.
- The first day of each of these lunar months is the ecclesiastical new moon. Exactly one ecclesiastical new moon in each year falls on a date between March 8 and April 5, both inclusive. This begins the paschal lunar month for that year, and thirteen days later (that is, between March 21 and April 18, both inclusive) is the paschal full moon.
- Easter is the Sunday following the paschal full moon.

In other words, Easter falls from one to seven days after the paschal full moon, so that if the paschal full moon is on Sunday, Easter is the following Sunday. Thus the earliest possible date of Easter is March 22, while the latest possible date is April 25.

=== Earliest Easter ===
In 1818, as the paschal full moon fell on Saturday March 21 (the ecclesiastical fixed date for the Equinox), Easter was the following day—Sunday March 22—the earliest date possible. It will not fall on this date again until 2285, a span of 467 years.

=== Latest Easter ===
In 1943 an ecclesiastical full moon fell on Saturday March 20. As this was before March 21, the next ecclesiastical full moon, which fell on Sunday April 18, determined the date of Easter—the following Sunday, April 25. It will not fall on this date again until 2038, a span of 95 years.

For a detailed discussion of the paschal computations, see Date of Easter (the Computus).

=== Easter tables ===
By the middle of the third century AD, computists of some churches, among which were the Church of Rome and the one of Alexandria, had begun to calculate their own periodic sequences of dates of paschal full moon, to be able to determine their own dates of Easter Sunday. The motivation for these experiments was a dissatisfaction with the Jewish calendars on which Christians had hitherto used as their basis to fix the date of Easter. These Jewish calendars, according to their Christian critics, sometimes placed Nisan 14, the paschal full moon and the day of preparation for the Jewish Passover, before the spring equinox (see Easter). The Christians, who began the experiments with independent computations, held that the paschal full moon should never precede the equinox.

The computational principles developed at Alexandria eventually became normative, but their reception was a centuries-long process during which Alexandrian Easter tables competed with other tables incorporating different arithmetical parameters. So for a period of several centuries the sequences of dates of the paschal full moon applied by different churches could show great differences (see Easter controversy).

In the Book of Common Prayer of the Episcopal Church the dates of the paschal full moons for the 19 years of the Gregorian Easter cycle are indicated by the placement of the golden number to the left of the date in March or April on which the paschal full moon falls in that year of the cycle.,

== See also ==
- Computus – Calculation of the date of Easter
- Dionysius Exiguus' Easter table – Ecclesiastical table constructed in 525
- Metonic cycle – 19 solar year recurrence of lunar phases
  - Golden number (time) – Position of the year within the Metonic cycle
- Reform of the date of Easter – Proposals to change the festival date
