= Leap year starting on Friday =

2016 is a leap year starting on Friday

A leap year starting on Friday is any year with 366 days (i.e. it includes 29 February) that begins on Friday 1 January and ends on Saturday 31 December. Its dominical letters hence are CB. The most recent year of such kind was 2016, and the next one will be 2044 in the Gregorian calendar, and 2000 and 2028 in the obsolete Julian calendar.

Any leap year that starts on Friday has only one Friday the 13th. The only one in this leap year occurs in May. Common years starting on Saturday share this characteristic.

== Calendars ==
Calendar for any leap year starting on Friday,
presented as common in many English-speaking areas

| | January |
| Su | Mo | Tu | We | Th | Fr | Sa |
| | | | | | 1 | 2 |
| 3 | 4 | 5 | 6 | 7 | 8 | 9 |
| 10 | 11 | 12 | 13 | 14 | 15 | 16 |
| 17 | 18 | 19 | 20 | 21 | 22 | 23 |
| 24 | 25 | 26 | 27 | 28 | 29 | 30 |
| 31 |

| | February |
| Su | Mo | Tu | We | Th | Fr | Sa |
| | 1 | 2 | 3 | 4 | 5 | 6 |
| 7 | 8 | 9 | 10 | 11 | 12 | 13 |
| 14 | 15 | 16 | 17 | 18 | 19 | 20 |
| 21 | 22 | 23 | 24 | 25 | 26 | 27 |
| 28 | 29 |

| | March |
| Su | Mo | Tu | We | Th | Fr | Sa |
| | | 1 | 2 | 3 | 4 | 5 |
| 6 | 7 | 8 | 9 | 10 | 11 | 12 |
| 13 | 14 | 15 | 16 | 17 | 18 | 19 |
| 20 | 21 | 22 | 23 | 24 | 25 | 26 |
| 27 | 28 | 29 | 30 | 31 |

| | April |
| Su | Mo | Tu | We | Th | Fr | Sa |
| | | | | | 1 | 2 |
| 3 | 4 | 5 | 6 | 7 | 8 | 9 |
| 10 | 11 | 12 | 13 | 14 | 15 | 16 |
| 17 | 18 | 19 | 20 | 21 | 22 | 23 |
| 24 | 25 | 26 | 27 | 28 | 29 | 30 |

| | May |
| Su | Mo | Tu | We | Th | Fr | Sa |
| 1 | 2 | 3 | 4 | 5 | 6 | 7 |
| 8 | 9 | 10 | 11 | 12 | 13 | 14 |
| 15 | 16 | 17 | 18 | 19 | 20 | 21 |
| 22 | 23 | 24 | 25 | 26 | 27 | 28 |
| 29 | 30 | 31 |

| | June |
| Su | Mo | Tu | We | Th | Fr | Sa |
| | | | 1 | 2 | 3 | 4 |
| 5 | 6 | 7 | 8 | 9 | 10 | 11 |
| 12 | 13 | 14 | 15 | 16 | 17 | 18 |
| 19 | 20 | 21 | 22 | 23 | 24 | 25 |
| 26 | 27 | 28 | 29 | 30 |

| | July |
| Su | Mo | Tu | We | Th | Fr | Sa |
| | | | | | 1 | 2 |
| 3 | 4 | 5 | 6 | 7 | 8 | 9 |
| 10 | 11 | 12 | 13 | 14 | 15 | 16 |
| 17 | 18 | 19 | 20 | 21 | 22 | 23 |
| 24 | 25 | 26 | 27 | 28 | 29 | 30 |
| 31 |

| | August |
| Su | Mo | Tu | We | Th | Fr | Sa |
| | 1 | 2 | 3 | 4 | 5 | 6 |
| 7 | 8 | 9 | 10 | 11 | 12 | 13 |
| 14 | 15 | 16 | 17 | 18 | 19 | 20 |
| 21 | 22 | 23 | 24 | 25 | 26 | 27 |
| 28 | 29 | 30 | 31 |

| | September |
| Su | Mo | Tu | We | Th | Fr | Sa |
| | | | | 1 | 2 | 3 |
| 4 | 5 | 6 | 7 | 8 | 9 | 10 |
| 11 | 12 | 13 | 14 | 15 | 16 | 17 |
| 18 | 19 | 20 | 21 | 22 | 23 | 24 |
| 25 | 26 | 27 | 28 | 29 | 30 |

| | October |
| Su | Mo | Tu | We | Th | Fr | Sa |
| | | | | | | 1 |
| 2 | 3 | 4 | 5 | 6 | 7 | 8 |
| 9 | 10 | 11 | 12 | 13 | 14 | 15 |
| 16 | 17 | 18 | 19 | 20 | 21 | 22 |
| 23 | 24 | 25 | 26 | 27 | 28 | 29 |
| 30 | 31 |

| | November |
| Su | Mo | Tu | We | Th | Fr | Sa |
| | | 1 | 2 | 3 | 4 | 5 |
| 6 | 7 | 8 | 9 | 10 | 11 | 12 |
| 13 | 14 | 15 | 16 | 17 | 18 | 19 |
| 20 | 21 | 22 | 23 | 24 | 25 | 26 |
| 27 | 28 | 29 | 30 |

| | December |
| Su | Mo | Tu | We | Th | Fr | Sa |
| | | | | 1 | 2 | 3 |
| 4 | 5 | 6 | 7 | 8 | 9 | 10 |
| 11 | 12 | 13 | 14 | 15 | 16 | 17 |
| 18 | 19 | 20 | 21 | 22 | 23 | 24 |
| 25 | 26 | 27 | 28 | 29 | 30 | 31 |

ISO 8601-conformant calendar with week numbers for
any leap year starting on Friday (dominical letter CB)

| | January |
| Wk | Mo | Tu | We | Th | Fr | Sa | Su |
| 53 | | | | | 01 | 02 | 03 |
| 01 | 04 | 05 | 06 | 07 | 08 | 09 | 10 |
| 02 | 11 | 12 | 13 | 14 | 15 | 16 | 17 |
| 03 | 18 | 19 | 20 | 21 | 22 | 23 | 24 |
| 04 | 25 | 26 | 27 | 28 | 29 | 30 | 31 |

| | February |
| Wk | Mo | Tu | We | Th | Fr | Sa | Su |
| 05 | 01 | 02 | 03 | 04 | 05 | 06 | 07 |
| 06 | 08 | 09 | 10 | 11 | 12 | 13 | 14 |
| 07 | 15 | 16 | 17 | 18 | 19 | 20 | 21 |
| 08 | 22 | 23 | 24 | 25 | 26 | 27 | 28 |
| 09 | 29 |

| | March |
| Wk | Mo | Tu | We | Th | Fr | Sa | Su |
| 09 | | 01 | 02 | 03 | 04 | 05 | 06 |
| 10 | 07 | 08 | 09 | 10 | 11 | 12 | 13 |
| 11 | 14 | 15 | 16 | 17 | 18 | 19 | 20 |
| 12 | 21 | 22 | 23 | 24 | 25 | 26 | 27 |
| 13 | 28 | 29 | 30 | 31 |

| | April |
| Wk | Mo | Tu | We | Th | Fr | Sa | Su |
| 13 | | | | | 01 | 02 | 03 |
| 14 | 04 | 05 | 06 | 07 | 08 | 09 | 10 |
| 15 | 11 | 12 | 13 | 14 | 15 | 16 | 17 |
| 16 | 18 | 19 | 20 | 21 | 22 | 23 | 24 |
| 17 | 25 | 26 | 27 | 28 | 29 | 30 |

| | May |
| Wk | Mo | Tu | We | Th | Fr | Sa | Su |
| 17 | | | | | | | 01 |
| 18 | 02 | 03 | 04 | 05 | 06 | 07 | 08 |
| 19 | 09 | 10 | 11 | 12 | 13 | 14 | 15 |
| 20 | 16 | 17 | 18 | 19 | 20 | 21 | 22 |
| 21 | 23 | 24 | 25 | 26 | 27 | 28 | 29 |
| 22 | 30 | 31 |

| | June |
| Wk | Mo | Tu | We | Th | Fr | Sa | Su |
| 22 | | | 01 | 02 | 03 | 04 | 05 |
| 23 | 06 | 07 | 08 | 09 | 10 | 11 | 12 |
| 24 | 13 | 14 | 15 | 16 | 17 | 18 | 19 |
| 25 | 20 | 21 | 22 | 23 | 24 | 25 | 26 |
| 26 | 27 | 28 | 29 | 30 |

| | July |
| Wk | Mo | Tu | We | Th | Fr | Sa | Su |
| 26 | | | | | 01 | 02 | 03 |
| 27 | 04 | 05 | 06 | 07 | 08 | 09 | 10 |
| 28 | 11 | 12 | 13 | 14 | 15 | 16 | 17 |
| 29 | 18 | 19 | 20 | 21 | 22 | 23 | 24 |
| 30 | 25 | 26 | 27 | 28 | 29 | 30 | 31 |

| | August |
| Wk | Mo | Tu | We | Th | Fr | Sa | Su |
| 31 | 01 | 02 | 03 | 04 | 05 | 06 | 07 |
| 32 | 08 | 09 | 10 | 11 | 12 | 13 | 14 |
| 33 | 15 | 16 | 17 | 18 | 19 | 20 | 21 |
| 34 | 22 | 23 | 24 | 25 | 26 | 27 | 28 |
| 35 | 29 | 30 | 31 |

| | September |
| Wk | Mo | Tu | We | Th | Fr | Sa | Su |
| 35 | | | | 01 | 02 | 03 | 04 |
| 36 | 05 | 06 | 07 | 08 | 09 | 10 | 11 |
| 37 | 12 | 13 | 14 | 15 | 16 | 17 | 18 |
| 38 | 19 | 20 | 21 | 22 | 23 | 24 | 25 |
| 39 | 26 | 27 | 28 | 29 | 30 |

| | October |
| Wk | Mo | Tu | We | Th | Fr | Sa | Su |
| 39 | | | | | | 01 | 02 |
| 40 | 03 | 04 | 05 | 06 | 07 | 08 | 09 |
| 41 | 10 | 11 | 12 | 13 | 14 | 15 | 16 |
| 42 | 17 | 18 | 19 | 20 | 21 | 22 | 23 |
| 43 | 24 | 25 | 26 | 27 | 28 | 29 | 30 |
| 44 | 31 |

| | November |
| Wk | Mo | Tu | We | Th | Fr | Sa | Su |
| 44 | | 01 | 02 | 03 | 04 | 05 | 06 |
| 45 | 07 | 08 | 09 | 10 | 11 | 12 | 13 |
| 46 | 14 | 15 | 16 | 17 | 18 | 19 | 20 |
| 47 | 21 | 22 | 23 | 24 | 25 | 26 | 27 |
| 48 | 28 | 29 | 30 |

| | December |
| Wk | Mo | Tu | We | Th | Fr | Sa | Su |
| 48 | | | | 01 | 02 | 03 | 04 |
| 49 | 05 | 06 | 07 | 08 | 09 | 10 | 11 |
| 50 | 12 | 13 | 14 | 15 | 16 | 17 | 18 |
| 51 | 19 | 20 | 21 | 22 | 23 | 24 | 25 |
| 52 | 26 | 27 | 28 | 29 | 30 | 31 |

== Applicable years ==
=== Gregorian Calendar ===
Leap years that begin on Friday, along with those starting on Sunday, occur most frequently: 15 of the 97 (≈ 15.46%) total leap years in a 400-year cycle of the Gregorian calendar. Thus, their overall occurrence is 3.75% (15 out of 400).

For this kind of year, the ISO week 10 (which begins March 7) and all subsequent ISO weeks occur later than in all other leap years.

Gregorian leap years starting on Friday
| Decade | 1st | 2nd | 3rd | 4th | 5th | 6th | 7th | 8th | 9th | 10th |
|---|---|---|---|---|---|---|---|---|---|---|
| 16th century | prior to first adoption (proleptic) | | | | | | | | 1588 | |
| 17th century | | 1616 | | | 1644 | | | 1672 | | |
| 18th century | | 1712 | | 1740 | | | 1768 | | | 1796 |
| 19th century | 1808 | | | 1836 | | | 1864 | | | 1892 |
| 20th century | 1904 | | | 1932 | | 1960 | | | 1988 | |
| 21st century | | 2016 | | | 2044 | | | 2072 | | |
| 22nd century | | 2112 | | 2140 | | | 2168 | | | 2196 |
| 23rd century | 2208 | | | 2236 | | | 2264 | | | 2292 |
| 24th century | 2304 | | | 2332 | | 2360 | | | 2388 | |
| 25th century | | 2416 | | | 2444 | | | 2472 | | |
| 26th century | | 2512 | | 2540 | | | 2568 | | | 2596 |

400-year cycle
| 0–99 | 16 | 44 | 72 | |
| 100–199 | 112 | 140 | 168 | 196 |
| 200–299 | 208 | 236 | 264 | 292 |
| 300–399 | 304 | 332 | 360 | 388 |

=== Julian Calendar ===
Like all leap year types, the one starting with 1 January on a Friday occurs exactly once in a 28-year cycle in the Julian calendar, i.e. in 3.57% of years. As the Julian calendar repeats after 28 years that means it will also repeat after 700 years, i.e. 25 cycles. The year's position in the cycle is given by the formula ((year + 8) mod 28) + 1).

Julian leap years starting on Friday
| Decade | 1st | 2nd | 3rd | 4th | 5th | 6th | 7th | 8th | 9th | 10th |
|---|---|---|---|---|---|---|---|---|---|---|
| 15th century | | 1412 | | 1440 | | | 1468 | | | 1496 |
| 16th century | | | 1524 | | | 1552 | | 1580 | | |
| 17th century | 1608 | | | 1636 | | | 1664 | | | 1692 |
| 18th century | | 1720 | | | 1748 | | | 1776 | | |
| 19th century | 1804 | | | 1832 | | 1860 | | | 1888 | |
| 20th century | | 1916 | | | 1944 | | | 1972 | | 2000 |
| 21st century | | | 2028 | | | 2056 | | | 2084 | |
| 22nd century | | 2112 | | 2140 | | | 2168 | | | 2196 |

== Holidays ==
=== International ===
- Valentine's Day falls on a Sunday. This is the only type of leap year when Valentine’s Day falls in ISO week 6. They fall in ISO week 7 in all other leap years.
- The leap day (February 29) falls on a Monday.
- World Day for Grandparents and the Elderly falls on July 24.
- Halloween falls on a Monday.
- Christmas Day falls on a Sunday. This is the only type of leap year when Christmas Day falls in ISO week 51. They fall in ISO week 52 in all other leap years.

=== Roman Catholic Solemnities ===
- Epiphany falls on a Wednesday
- Candlemas falls on a Tuesday
- Saint Joseph's Day falls on a Saturday
- The Annunciation of Jesus falls on a Friday
- The Nativity of John the Baptist falls on a Friday
- The Solemnity of Saints Peter and Paul falls on a Wednesday
- The Transfiguration of Jesus falls on a Saturday
- The Assumption of Mary falls on a Monday
- The Exaltation of the Holy Cross falls on a Wednesday
- All Saints' Day falls on a Tuesday
- All Souls' Day falls on a Wednesday
- The Feast of Christ the King falls on its earliest possible date, November 20 (or on October 30 in versions of the calendar between 1925 and 1962)
- The First Sunday of Advent falls on its earliest possible date, November 27. This is the only leap year when The First Sunday of Advent falls in ISO week 47. They fall in ISO week 48 in all other leap years.
- The Immaculate Conception falls on a Thursday
- Gaudete Sunday falls on its earliest possible date, December 11. This is the only leap year when Gaduete Sunday falls in ISO week 49. They fall in ISO week 50 in all other leap years.
- Rorate Sunday falls on its earliest possible date, December 18. This is the only leap year when Rorate Sunday falls in ISO week 50. They fall in ISO week 51 in all other leap years.

=== Australia and New Zealand ===
- Australia Day falls on a Tuesday
- Waitangi Day falls on a Saturday
- Daylight saving ends on April 3
- ANZAC Day falls on a Monday
- Mother's Day falls on its earliest possible date, May 8. This is the only leap year when Mother’s Day falls in ISO week 18. They fall in ISO week 19 in all other leap years.
- Father's Day falls on September 4
- Daylight saving begins on September 25 in New Zealand and October 2 in Australia

=== British Isles ===
- Saint David's Day falls on a Tuesday
- Mother's Day falls on March 6, March 13, March 20, March 27 or April 3
- Daylight saving begins on March 27
- Saint Patrick's Day falls on a Thursday
- Saint George's Day falls on a Saturday
- Father's Day falls on June 19
- Orangeman's Day falls on a Tuesday
- Daylight saving ends on October 30
- Guy Fawkes Night falls on a Saturday
- Saint Andrew's Day falls on a Wednesday

=== Canada ===
- Daylight saving begins on March 13
- Mother's Day falls on its earliest possible date, May 8. This is the only leap year when Mother’s Day falls in ISO week 18. They fall in ISO week 19 in all other leap years
- Victoria Day falls on May 23
- Father's Day falls on June 19
- Canada Day falls on a Friday
- Labour Day falls on September 5
- Thanksgiving Day falls on October 10
- Daylight saving ends on November 6

=== United States ===
- Martin Luther King Jr. Day falls on January 18
- President's Day falls on its earliest possible date, February 15. This is the only leap year when President’s Day falls in ISO week 7. They fall in ISO week 8 in all other leap years. This is also the only leap year when Labor Day that precedes this type of year to President’s Day in this type of year are only 23 weeks apart. They are 24 weeks apart in all other leap years.
- Daylight saving begins on March 13
- Mother's Day falls on its earliest possible date, May 8. This is the only leap year when Mother’s Day falls in ISO week 18. They fall in ISO week 19 in all other leap years.
- Memorial Day falls on May 30
- Juneteenth and Father's Day coincide on Sunday, June 19. This is the only leap year when Juneteenth falls in ISO week 24. They fall in ISO week 25 in all other leap years.
- Independence Day falls on a Monday
- Labor Day falls on September 5
- Grandparents' Day falls on September 11
- Columbus Day falls on October 10
- Daylight saving ends on November 6
- Election Day falls on its latest possible date, November 8
- Thanksgiving Day falls on November 24
