= Golden number (time) =

Position of the year within the Metonic cycle

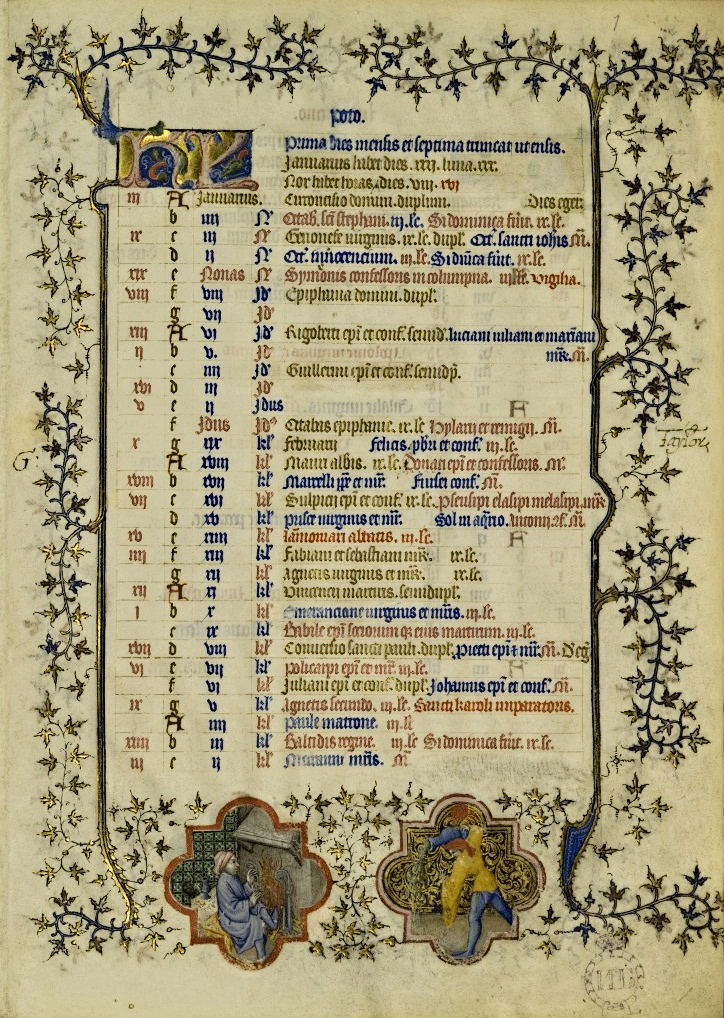
Month of January from Calendarium Parisiense (fourth quarter of the 14th c.). The golden numbers, in the leftmost column, indicate the date of the new moon for each year in the 19-year cycle

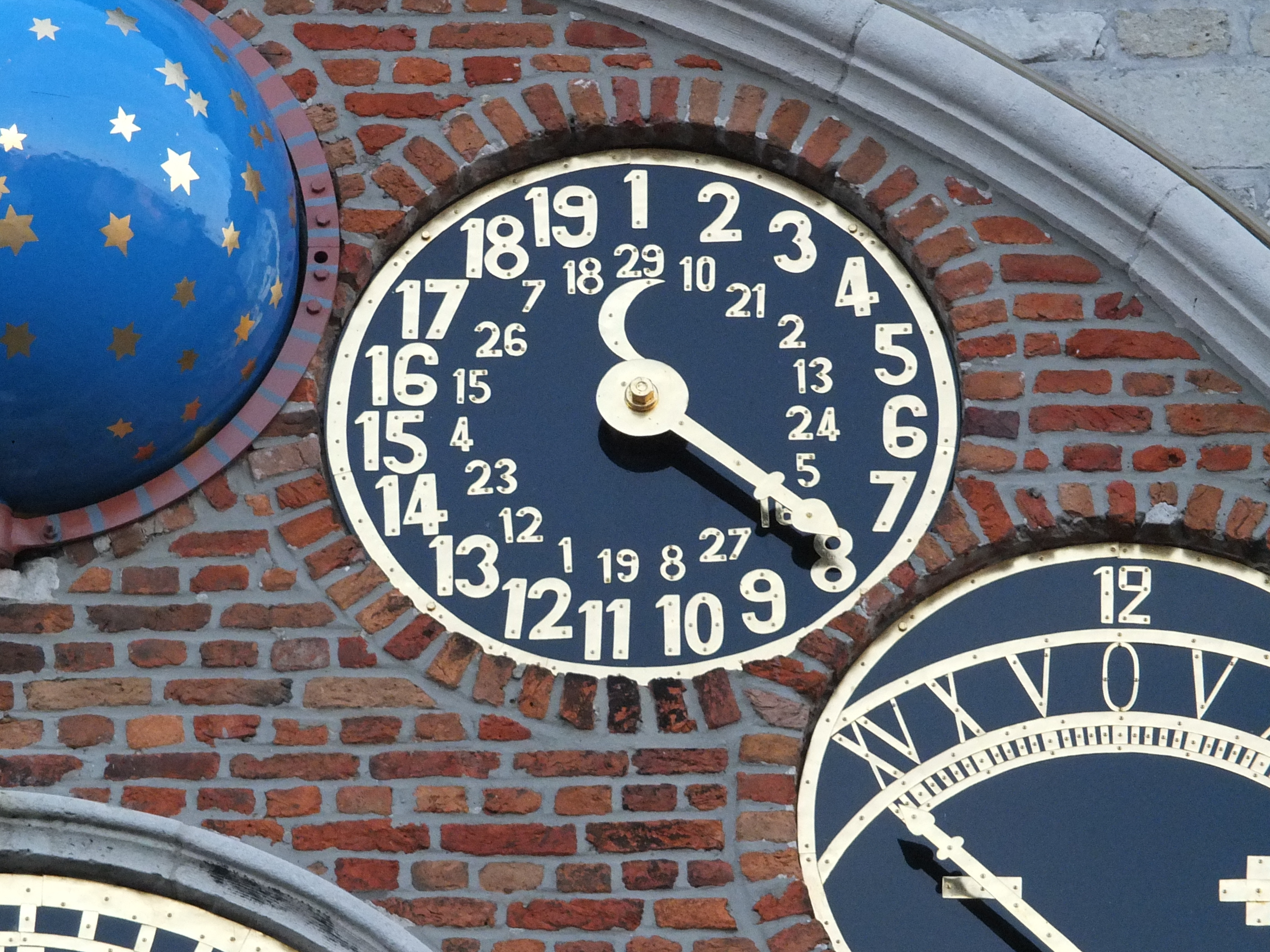
Face on the Zimmer tower in Lier, Belgium: On the outer ring, the hand points to the golden number, or the number of the current year in the metonic cycle. The inner ring shows the epact, which is the age of the moon on the first of January of the current year.

A golden number (sometimes capitalized) is a number assigned to each year in sequence which is used to indicate the dates of all the calendric new moons for each year in a 19-year Metonic cycle. They are used in computus (the calculation of the date of Easter) and also in Runic calendars.

The golden number of any Julian or Gregorian calendar year can be calculated by dividing the year by nineteen, taking the remainder and adding one. (In mathematics this can be expressed as ((year number modulo 19) + 1).

For example, 2026 divided by 19 gives 106, remainder 12, which after adding 1 gives the golden number 13.

The golden number, as it was later called, first appears in a calendar composed by Abbo of Fleury around the year 1000. Around 1162 a certain Master William referred to this number as the golden number "because it is more precious than the other numbers." The name refers to the practice of printing golden numbers in gold. The term became widely known and used, in part through the computistic poem Massa Compoti written by Alexander de Villa Dei around 1200.

== See also ==
- Dominical letter
- Date of Easter
- Paschal Full Moon
