= XXXVII Corps =

XXXVII Corps or 37th Corps may refer to:

- 37th Army Corps, Russian Empire
- 37th Guards Airborne Corps, Soviet Union
- 37th (St Giles's and St George's Bloomsbury) Middlesex Rifle Volunteer Corps, United Kingdom
- 37th (Barnsley) Yorkshire West Riding Rifle Volunteer Corps, United Kingdom
- XXXVII Corps (United States)

== See also ==
- List of military corps by number
- 37th Army (disambiguation)
- 37th Battalion (disambiguation)
- 37th Brigade (disambiguation)
- 37th Division (disambiguation)
- 37th Regiment (disambiguation)
- 37th Squadron (disambiguation)
- 37th (disambiguation)
