= 37th Cavalry =

37th Cavalry may refer to:

- 37th Cavalry Division (Soviet Union)
- 37th SS Volunteer Cavalry Division Lützow
- 37th Lancers (Baluch Horse)
- 37th Virginia Cavalry Battalion
- 37th (Buckinghamshire) Company, Imperial Yeomanry

== See also ==
- 37th Division (disambiguation)
- 37th Brigade (disambiguation)
- 37th Regiment (disambiguation)
- 37th (disambiguation)
