= 37th Army =

37th Army may refer to:

- Thirty-Seventh Army (Japan), Imperial Japanese Army
- 37th Air Army, Russia/Soviet Union
- 37th Army (Soviet Union)

== See also ==
- List of armies by number
- 37th Division (disambiguation)
- 37th Brigade (disambiguation)
- 37th Regiment (disambiguation)
- 37th Battalion (disambiguation)
- 37th Squadron (disambiguation)
- 37th (disambiguation)
