= 37th =

37th is the ordinal form of the number 37. It also commonly refers to a fraction, 1/37, equal to one of 37 equal parts.

37th or Thirty-seventh may also refer to:

== History and geography ==
- 37th meridian east, a line of longitude that extends across Europe, Asia, Africa, the Indian Ocean, the Southern Ocean and Antarctica
- 37th meridian west, a line of longitude that extends across Greenland, the Atlantic Ocean, South America, the Southern Ocean and Antarctica
- 37th parallel north, a circle of latitude that is 37 degrees north of the Earth's equatorial plane
- 37th parallel south, a circle of latitude that is 37 degrees south of the Earth's equatorial plane
- 37th Street (Austin), a street in Austin, Texas, known for its many houses that are decorated with Christmas lights
- 37th Street (Los Angeles Metro station), a Metro Silver Line Station on the Harbor Transitway on the Interstate 110 (Harbor Freeway)
- 37th Street (Savannah), a historic divided boulevard in Savannah, Georgia, passing through the Cuyler-Brownsville and Mid-City historic districts
- 37th century, from January 1, 3601 to December 31, 3700 of the Gregorian calendar
- 37th century BC in the 4th millennium BC

== Entertainment ==
- 37th Academy Awards honored film achievements of 1964
- 37th Annie Awards, honoring the best in animation for 2009, held in 2010 at Royce Hall in Los Angeles, California
- 37th British Academy Film Awards, given by the British Academy of Film and Television Arts in 1984, honoured the best films of 1983
- 37th Daytime Emmy Awards, held on June 27, 2010, hosted by Regis Philbin and broadcast on the CBS network
- 37th Berlin International Film Festival, held from 20 February to 3 March 1987
- 37th Filmfare Awards, held in 1992
- 37th GMA Dove Awards, held on April 5, 2006, recognizing accomplishments of Christian musicians for the year 2005
- 37th Golden Globe Awards, honoring the best in film and television for 1979, held on 26 January 1980
- 37th Grammy Awards, presented March 1, 1995
- 37th Japan Record Awards took place on December 31, 1995, starting at 6:30PM JST
- 37th NAACP Image Awards, honored the best in film, television and music for 2005
- 37th People's Choice Awards, honoring the best in popular culture for 2010, held in 2011 at the Nokia Theatre in Los Angeles, California
- 37th Primetime Emmy Awards, held on September 22, 1985
- 37th Saturn Awards, honoring the best in science fiction, fantasy and horror film and television in 2010, held on June 23, 2011
- 37th Tony Awards, held at the Gershwin Theatre on June 5, 1983, and broadcast by CBS television
- 37th World Science Fiction Convention, Seacon '79, held in Brighton, UK, 23–26 August 1979 at the Metropole Hotel

== Sports ==
- 37th Chess Olympiad, between 20 May and 6 June 2006, in Turin, Italy
- 37th Grey Cup, played on November 26, 1949, before 20,087 fans at Varsity Stadium at Toronto
- 37th National Hockey League All-Star Game, held in the Olympic Saddledome in Calgary, Alberta, on February 12, 1985
- 37th Tengen, a Go competition in Japan which began on 7 July 2010 and is still ongoing
- 37th Vanier Cup, played on November 25, 2001, at the SkyDome in Toronto, Ontario

== Politics and government ==
- 37th Canadian Parliament, in session from January 29, 2001, until May 23, 2004
- 37th Delaware General Assembly, a meeting of the legislative branch of the state government
- 37th G8 summit, held 26–27 May 2011 in the commune of Deauville in France
- 37th General Assembly of Nova Scotia represented Nova Scotia between 1920 and 1925
- 37th General Assembly of Prince Edward Island, in session from March 7, 1912, to August 21, 1915
- 37th Legislative Assembly of Ontario, in session from June 8, 1999, until May 5, 2003, just prior to the Ontario general election
- 37th Legislative District (New Jersey), one of 40 in the state
- 37th National Assembly of Quebec from 2003 to 2007
- 37th New Brunswick Legislative Assembly represented New Brunswick between February 12, 1931, and May 22, 1935
- 37th New York State Legislature, met in 1814 during the seventh year of Daniel D. Tompkins's governorship, in Albany
- 37th Parliament of British Columbia sat from 2001 to 2005
- 37th United States Congress, a meeting of the legislative branch of the US federal government

== Military units ==
- 37th (Howitzer) Brigade Royal Field Artillery, a brigade of the Royal Field Artillery which served in the First World War
- 37th (North Hampshire) Regiment of Foot, raised in Ireland in February 1702
- 37th (Northern Ontario) Battalion, CEF, raised in Halton during World War I
- 37th Aerospace Rescue and Recovery Squadron (37th ARRS), a rescue squadron of the USAF active during the Vietnam War
- 37th Air Army of the High Supreme Command (Strategic Purpose), the strategic bomber force of the Russian Air Force from 1998 to 2009
- 37th Air Division (37th AD), an inactive US Air Force organization
- 37th Airlift Squadron (37 AS), part of the 86th Airlift Wing at Ramstein Air Base, Germany
- 37th Arkansas Infantry Regiment (1862–1865), a Confederate Army infantry regiment during the American Civil War
- 37th Armor Regiment (United States) Nicknamed Iron Dukes, the 2nd Battalion was deployed to Operation Iraqi Freedom in 2003
- 37th Battalion (Australia), an infantry battalion of the Australian Army
- 37th Battalion Virginia Cavalry, a cavalry battalion raised in Virginia for service in the Confederate States Army during the American Civil War
- 37th Bomb Squadron (37 BS), part of the 28th Bomb Wing at Ellsworth Air Force Base, South Dakota
- 37th Division (German Empire), a unit of the Prussian/German Army formed in 1899
- 37th Division (Imperial Japanese Army), an infantry division in the Imperial Japanese Army
- 37th Division (United Kingdom), a unit of the British Army during World War I
- 37th Dogras, an infantry regiment of the British Indian Army
- 37th Engineer Battalion (United States) ("Eagle Battalion"), an airborne combat engineer battalion in the US Army
- 37th Field Artillery Regiment (United States), a Field Artillery regiment of the US Army
- 37th Flying Training Squadron, part of the 14th Flying Training Wing based at Columbus Air Force Base, Mississippi
- 37th Illinois Volunteer Infantry Regiment, an infantry regiment that served in the Union Army during the American Civil War
- 37th Indian Infantry Brigade, an Infantry formation of the Indian Army during World War II
- 37th Infantry Brigade Combat Team (United States)
- 37th Infantry Division (United States), a unit of the US Army in World War I and World War II
- 37th Infantry Regiment (United States), an infantry regiment in the US Army
- 37th Iowa Volunteer Infantry Regiment, an infantry regiment that served in the Union Army during the American Civil War
- 37th New Jersey Volunteer Infantry Regiment, an infantry regiment in the Union Army during the American Civil War
- 37th Ohio Infantry, a Union Army regiment, composed of German-Americans, in the American Civil War
- 37th Regiment Indiana Infantry, an infantry regiment that served in the Union Army during the American Civil War
- 37th Regiment Kentucky Volunteer Mounted Infantry, a mounted infantry regiment that served in the Union Army during the American Civil War
- 37th Regiment Massachusetts Volunteer Infantry, an infantry regiment in the Union army during the American Civil War
- 37th SS Volunteer Cavalry Division Lützow, formed in February 1945
- 37th Tactical Missile Squadron, an inactive US Air Force unit
- 37th Training Wing, a wing of the US Air Force stationed at Lackland Air Force Base in San Antonio, Texas
- 37th Virginia Infantry, an infantry regiment raised in Virginia for service in the Confederate States Army during the American Civil War
- 37th Wisconsin Volunteer Infantry Regiment, an infantry regiment that served in the Union Army during the American Civil War

== See also ==
- 37 (disambiguation)
- 37 (number)
- AD 37, the year 37 (XXXVII) of the Julian calendar
- 37 BC
- Pope Adrian 37th Psychristiatric, a concept album by the band Rudimentary Peni released in 1995
- The 37th Mandala, a horror novel written by Marc Laidlaw and published in 1996
- To Gillian on Her 37th Birthday, a 1996 American romantic drama film
- To Gillian on Her 37th Birthday (play), an American play by Michael Brady, published in 1984
