= FPN =

FPN may mean:

- Faculty of Political Science in Sarajevo (Bosnian: Fakultet političkih nauka u Sarajevu)
- Faculty of Political Sciences, University of Belgrade (Serbian: Fakultet političkih nauka Univerziteta u Beogradu)
- Family nurse practitioner in the United States
- Feldpost number, used for transmission of mail to German military in WWII
- Feminist Peace Network in the United States
- Fixed penalty notice, in the UK, a notification of what is usually a minor fine for an alleged criminal offence

== Science and technology ==
- Federated portal network, a software architecture
- Ferroportin, a protein
- Filtered-popping network in computer science
- Fixed-pattern noise in digital imaging
