= Z37 =

Z37 may refer to:

- Zlin Z-37 Čmelák, an aircraft
- German destroyer Z37, a warship
- HMS Barnstone (Z37), a Bar-class boom defence vessel of the British Royal Navy in WWII
- Point Arena Air Force Station (NORAD id Z-37), Point Arena, California, USA
- RFA Z.37 mortar battery, part of the 37th Division (United Kingdom)
- Small nucleolar RNA Z37

== See also ==
- 37 (disambiguation)
- z (disambiguation)
