= NS37 =

NS37, NS 37, NS-37, NS.37, or variation, may refer to:

- Nudelman-Suranov NS-37, a 37mm Soviet aircraft autocannon
- Lunenburg West (constituency N.S. 37), Nova Scotia, Canada; a provincial electoral district
- Kanuni (drillship), pennant NS37, an ultra-deep-water drillship
- New Penguin Shakespeare volume 37
- Blue Origin NS-37, a planned suborbital spaceflight

== See also ==
- NS (disambiguation)
- 37 (disambiguation)
