= 37th Street station =

37th Street station may refer to:

- 37th Street/USC station, a busway station in Los Angeles, California
- 37th–Spruce station, an underground trolley station in Philadelphia, Pennsylvania

== See also ==
- 37th Street (disambiguation)
