= 37th Division =

37th Division or 37th Infantry Division may refer to:

== Infantry divisions ==
- 37th Infantry Division (France)
- 37th Division (German Empire)
- 37th Infantry Division "Modena", Kingdom of Italy
- 37th Division (Imperial Japanese Army)
- 37th Infantry Division (Russian Empire)
- 37th Guards Motor Rifle Division, Soviet Union, earlier the 37th Guards Mechanized Division
- 37th Guards Rifle Division, Soviet Union
- 37th Rifle Division, Soviet Union
- 37th Division (Spain)
- 37th Division (United Kingdom)
- 37th Infantry Division (United States)
- 37th Division (Yugoslav Partisans)

== Cavalry Divisions ==
- 37th SS Volunteer Cavalry Division, Germany

== Armoured Divisions ==
- 37th Guards Tank Division, Soviet Union

== Aviation divisions ==
- 37th Air Division, United States
- 37th Aviation Division, Socialist Yugoslavia

== See also ==
- List of military divisions by number
- 37th Army (disambiguation)
- 37th Brigade (disambiguation)
- 37th Regiment (disambiguation)
- 37th Battalion (disambiguation)
- 37th Squadron (disambiguation)
