= Perfect month =

Unusual calendar event every 6-11 years

A perfect month or a rectangular month designates a month whose number of days is divisible by the number of days in a week and whose first day corresponds to the first day of the week. This causes the arrangement of the days of the month to resemble a rectangle. In the Gregorian calendar, this arrangement can only occur for the month of February.

== Constraints ==
To satisfy such an arrangement in the Gregorian calendar, the number of days in the month must be divisible by seven. Only the month of February of a common year can meet this constraint as the month has 28 days, a multiple of 7.

For a February to be a perfect month, the month must start on the first day of the week (usually considered to be Sunday or Monday). For Sunday-first calendars, this means that the year must start on a Thursday, and for Monday-first calendars, the year must start on a Friday. It must also occur in a common year, as the phenomenon does not occur when February has 29 days.

== Occurrence ==
In the Gregorian calendar, the phenomenon occurs every six years or eleven years following a 6-11-11, 11-6-11, or an 11-11-6 sequence until the end of the 21st century. The most recent perfect months were February 2015 (Sunday-first), February 2021 (Monday-first) and February 2026 (Sunday-first). Due to calculation rules, the years 1700, 1800, and 1900 are not leap years, causing a shift in the sequence with two instances of three consecutive spacings of six years each (1693, 1699, 1705, 1711 and 1789, 1795, 1801, 1807) and a spacing of twelve years between 1891 and 1903 for Sunday-first calendars; or two consecutive spacings of six years each (1694, 1700, and 1706) and spacings of twelve years between 1790 and 1802, and 1897 and 1909 respectively for Monday-first calendars. The Gregorian calendar repeats every 400 years, so 2094, 2100, and 2106 will all feature perfect months with spacings of six years on Monday-first calendars; while 2093, 2099, 2105, and 2111 will all feature perfect months with spacings of six years on Sunday-first calendars.

The next perfect months are February 2027 (Monday-first) and February 2037 (Sunday-first).

	February
Mo	Tu	We	Th	Fr	Sa	Su
1	2	3	4	5	6	7
8	9	10	11	12	13	14
15	16	17	18	19	20	21
22	23	24	25	26	27	28
2027

	February
Su	Mo	Tu	We	Th	Fr	Sa
1	2	3	4	5	6	7
8	9	10	11	12	13	14
15	16	17	18	19	20	21
22	23	24	25	26	27	28
2037

== Attributes ==
The calendar arrangement brings together notions of harmony and organization.

== See also ==
- Palindrome#Dates
- Perfectionism (psychology)
- Perfectionism (philosophy)
