= Common year starting on Thursday =

A common year starting on Thursday is any non-leap year (i.e. a year with 365 days) that begins on Thursday, 1 January, and ends on Thursday, 31 December. Its dominical letter hence is D. The current year, 2026, is a common year starting on Thursday in the Gregorian calendar, the last such year was 2015 and the next such year will be 2037, or, likewise, 2021 and 2027 in the obsolete Julian calendar, see below for more.

This is the only common year with three occurrences of Friday the 13th: those three in this common year occur in February, March, and November. Leap years starting on Sunday share this characteristic, for the months January, April, and July. From February until March in this type of year is also the shortest period (one month) that runs between two instances of Friday the 13th. Additionally, this is the one of only two types of years overall where a rectangular February is possible, in places where Sunday is considered to be the first day of the week. Common years starting on Friday share this characteristic, when Monday is considered to be the first day of the week.

== Calendars ==
Calendar for any common year starting on Thursday,
presented as common in many English-speaking areas

	January
Su	Mo	Tu	We	Th	Fr	Sa
				1	2	3
4	5	6	7	8	9	10
11	12	13	14	15	16	17
18	19	20	21	22	23	24
25	26	27	28	29	30	31

	February
Su	Mo	Tu	We	Th	Fr	Sa
1	2	3	4	5	6	7
8	9	10	11	12	13	14
15	16	17	18	19	20	21
22	23	24	25	26	27	28

	March
Su	Mo	Tu	We	Th	Fr	Sa
1	2	3	4	5	6	7
8	9	10	11	12	13	14
15	16	17	18	19	20	21
22	23	24	25	26	27	28
29	30	31

	April
Su	Mo	Tu	We	Th	Fr	Sa
			1	2	3	4
5	6	7	8	9	10	11
12	13	14	15	16	17	18
19	20	21	22	23	24	25
26	27	28	29	30

	May
Su	Mo	Tu	We	Th	Fr	Sa
					1	2
3	4	5	6	7	8	9
10	11	12	13	14	15	16
17	18	19	20	21	22	23
24	25	26	27	28	29	30
31

	June
Su	Mo	Tu	We	Th	Fr	Sa
	1	2	3	4	5	6
7	8	9	10	11	12	13
14	15	16	17	18	19	20
21	22	23	24	25	26	27
28	29	30

	July
Su	Mo	Tu	We	Th	Fr	Sa
			1	2	3	4
5	6	7	8	9	10	11
12	13	14	15	16	17	18
19	20	21	22	23	24	25
26	27	28	29	30	31

	August
Su	Mo	Tu	We	Th	Fr	Sa
						1
2	3	4	5	6	7	8
9	10	11	12	13	14	15
16	17	18	19	20	21	22
23	24	25	26	27	28	29
30	31

	September
Su	Mo	Tu	We	Th	Fr	Sa
		1	2	3	4	5
6	7	8	9	10	11	12
13	14	15	16	17	18	19
20	21	22	23	24	25	26
27	28	29	30

	October
Su	Mo	Tu	We	Th	Fr	Sa
				1	2	3
4	5	6	7	8	9	10
11	12	13	14	15	16	17
18	19	20	21	22	23	24
25	26	27	28	29	30	31

	November
Su	Mo	Tu	We	Th	Fr	Sa
1	2	3	4	5	6	7
8	9	10	11	12	13	14
15	16	17	18	19	20	21
22	23	24	25	26	27	28
29	30

	December
Su	Mo	Tu	We	Th	Fr	Sa
		1	2	3	4	5
6	7	8	9	10	11	12
13	14	15	16	17	18	19
20	21	22	23	24	25	26
27	28	29	30	31

ISO 8601-conformant calendar with week numbers for
any common year starting on Thursday (dominical letter D)

	January
Wk	Mo	Tu	We	Th	Fr	Sa	Su
01				01	02	03	04
02	05	06	07	08	09	10	11
03	12	13	14	15	16	17	18
04	19	20	21	22	23	24	25
05	26	27	28	29	30	31

	February
Wk	Mo	Tu	We	Th	Fr	Sa	Su
05							01
06	02	03	04	05	06	07	08
07	09	10	11	12	13	14	15
08	16	17	18	19	20	21	22
09	23	24	25	26	27	28

	March
Wk	Mo	Tu	We	Th	Fr	Sa	Su
09							01
10	02	03	04	05	06	07	08
11	09	10	11	12	13	14	15
12	16	17	18	19	20	21	22
13	23	24	25	26	27	28	29
14	30	31

	April
Wk	Mo	Tu	We	Th	Fr	Sa	Su
14			01	02	03	04	05
15	06	07	08	09	10	11	12
16	13	14	15	16	17	18	19
17	20	21	22	23	24	25	26
18	27	28	29	30

	May
Wk	Mo	Tu	We	Th	Fr	Sa	Su
18					01	02	03
19	04	05	06	07	08	09	10
20	11	12	13	14	15	16	17
21	18	19	20	21	22	23	24
22	25	26	27	28	29	30	31

	June
Wk	Mo	Tu	We	Th	Fr	Sa	Su
23	01	02	03	04	05	06	07
24	08	09	10	11	12	13	14
25	15	16	17	18	19	20	21
26	22	23	24	25	26	27	28
27	29	30

	July
Wk	Mo	Tu	We	Th	Fr	Sa	Su
27			01	02	03	04	05
28	06	07	08	09	10	11	12
29	13	14	15	16	17	18	19
30	20	21	22	23	24	25	26
31	27	28	29	30	31

	August
Wk	Mo	Tu	We	Th	Fr	Sa	Su
31						01	02
32	03	04	05	06	07	08	09
33	10	11	12	13	14	15	16
34	17	18	19	20	21	22	23
35	24	25	26	27	28	29	30
36	31

	September
Wk	Mo	Tu	We	Th	Fr	Sa	Su
36		01	02	03	04	05	06
37	07	08	09	10	11	12	13
38	14	15	16	17	18	19	20
39	21	22	23	24	25	26	27
40	28	29	30

	October
Wk	Mo	Tu	We	Th	Fr	Sa	Su
40				01	02	03	04
41	05	06	07	08	09	10	11
42	12	13	14	15	16	17	18
43	19	20	21	22	23	24	25
44	26	27	28	29	30	31

	November
Wk	Mo	Tu	We	Th	Fr	Sa	Su
44							01
45	02	03	04	05	06	07	08
46	09	10	11	12	13	14	15
47	16	17	18	19	20	21	22
48	23	24	25	26	27	28	29
49	30

	December
Wk	Mo	Tu	We	Th	Fr	Sa	Su
49		01	02	03	04	05	06
50	07	08	09	10	11	12	13
51	14	15	16	17	18	19	20
52	21	22	23	24	25	26	27
53	28	29	30	31

== Applicable years ==
=== Gregorian Calendar ===
In the (currently used) Gregorian calendar, alongside Tuesday, the fourteen types of year (seven common, seven leap) repeat in a 400-year cycle (20871 weeks). Forty-four common years per cycle or exactly 11% start on a Thursday. The 28-year sub-cycle only spans across century years divisible by 400, e.g. 1600, 2000, and 2400.

For this kind of year, the corresponding ISO year has 53 weeks, and the ISO week 10 (which begins March 2) and all subsequent ISO weeks occur earlier than in all other common years.

Gregorian common years starting on Thursday
Decade	1st		2nd	3rd	4th		5th	6th		7th		8th	9th		10th	
16th century	prior to first adoption (proleptic)													1587	1598	
17th century	1609		1615	1626	1637		1643	1654		1665		1671	1682		1693	1699
18th century	1705		1711	1722	1733	1739	1750	—		1761	1767	1778	1789		1795	
19th century	1801	1807	1818	1829	1835		1846	1857		1863		1874	1885		1891	
20th century	1903		1914	1925	1931		1942	1953	1959	—		1970	1981	1987	1998	
21st century	2009		2015	2026	2037		2043	2054		2065		2071	2082		2093	2099
22nd century	2105		2111	2122	2133	2139	2150	—		2161	2167	2178	2189		2195	
23rd century	2201	2207	2218	2229	2235		2246	2257		2263		2274	2285		2291	
24th century	2303		2314	2325	2331		2342	2353	2359	—		2370	2381	2387	2398	
25th century	2409		2415	2426	2437		2443	2454		2465		2471	2482		2493	2499

400-year cycle
0–99	9	15	26	37	43	54	65	71	82	93	99
100–199	105	111	122	133	139	150	161	167	178	189	195
200–299	201	207	218	229	235	246	257	263	274	285	291
300–399	303	314	325	331	342	353	359	370	381	387	398

=== Julian Calendar ===
In the now-obsolete Julian calendar, the fourteen types of year (seven common, seven leap) repeat in a 28-year cycle (1461 weeks). A leap year has two adjoining dominical letters (one for January and February and the other for March to December, as 29 February has no letter). This sequence occurs exactly once within a cycle, and every common letter thrice.

As the Julian calendar repeats after 28 years that means it will also repeat after 700 years, i.e. 25 cycles. The year's position in the cycle is given by the formula ((year + 8) mod 28) + 1). Years 3, 14 and 20 of the cycle are common years beginning on Thursday. 2017 is year 10 of the cycle. Approximately 10.71% of all years are common years beginning on Thursday.

Julian common years starting on Thursday
Decade	1st	2nd	3rd		4th		5th	6th		7th	8th	9th		10th	
15th century	1405	1411	1422		1433	1439	1450		—	1461	1467	1478		1489	1495
16th century	1506	1517	1523		1534		1545	1551		1562	1573	1579	1590		—
17th century	1601	1607	1618	1629		1635	1646	1657		1663	1674	1685		1691	
18th century	1702	1713	1719	1730		—	1741	1747	1758	1769		1775	1786		1797
19th century	1803	1814	1825		1831		1842	1853	1859	1870	—	1881	1887	1898	
20th century	1909	1915	1926		1937		1943	1954		1965	1971	1982		1993	1999
21st century	2010	—	2021	2027	2038		2049	2055		2066	2077	2083		2094	

== Holidays ==
=== International ===
- Valentine's Day falls on a Saturday
- World Day for Grandparents and the Elderly falls on July 26
- Halloween falls on a Saturday
- Christmas Day falls on a Friday

=== Roman Catholic Solemnities ===
- Epiphany falls on a Tuesday
- Candlemas falls on a Monday
- Saint Joseph's Day falls on a Thursday
- The Annunciation of Jesus falls on a Wednesday
- The Nativity of John the Baptist falls on a Wednesday
- The Solemnity of Saints Peter and Paul falls on a Monday
- The Transfiguration of Jesus falls on a Thursday
- The Assumption of Mary falls on a Saturday
- The Exaltation of the Holy Cross falls on a Monday
- All Saints' Day falls on a Sunday
- All Souls' Day falls on a Monday
- The Feast of Christ the King falls on November 22 (or on its earliest possible date of October 25 in versions of the calendar between 1925 and 1962)
- The First Sunday of Advent falls on November 29
- The Immaculate Conception falls on a Tuesday
- Gaudete Sunday falls on December 13
- Rorate Sunday falls on December 20

=== Australia and New Zealand ===
- Australia Day falls on a Monday
- Waitangi Day falls on a Friday
- Daylight saving ends on April 5
- ANZAC Day falls on a Saturday
- Mother's Day falls on May 10
- Father's Day falls on September 6
- Daylight saving begins on September 27 in New Zealand and October 4 in Australia

=== British Isles ===
- Saint David's Day falls on a Sunday
- Mother's Day falls on its earliest possible date of March 1, or on March 8, March 15, March 22 or March 29
- Saint Patrick's Day falls on a Tuesday
- Daylight saving begins on March 29
- Saint George's Day falls on a Thursday
- Father's Day falls on its latest possible date, June 21. This is only common year when Father's Day falls on ISO week 25. It falls on ISO week 24 in all of the common years.
- Orangeman's Day falls on a Sunday
- Daylight saving ends on its earliest possible date, October 25
- Guy Fawkes Night falls on a Thursday
- Saint Andrew's Day falls on a Monday

=== Canada ===
- Daylight saving begins on its earliest possible date, March 8
- Mother's Day falls on May 10
- Victoria Day falls on its earliest possible date, May 18
- Father's Day falls on its latest possible date, June 21
- Canada Day falls on a Wednesday
- Labour Day falls on its latest possible date, September 7 – this is the only common year when Victoria Day and Labour Day are sixteen weeks apart (they are fifteen weeks apart in all other common years)
- Thanksgiving Day falls on October 12
- Daylight saving ends on its earliest possible date, November 1

=== Denmark ===
- The Constitution Day falls on a Friday

=== Germany ===
- The reunification falls on a Saturday

=== United States ===
- Martin Luther King Jr. Day falls on January 19
- President's Day falls on February 16
- Daylight saving begins on its earliest possible date, March 8
- Mother's Day falls on May 10
- Memorial Day falls on its earliest possible date, May 25
- Juneteenth falls on a Friday
- Father's Day falls on its latest possible date, June 21
- Independence Day falls on a Saturday
- Labor Day falls on its latest possible date, September 7 – this is the only common year when Memorial Day and Labor Day are fifteen weeks apart (they are fourteen weeks apart in all other common years)
- Grandparents' Day falls on its latest possible date, September 13
- Columbus Day falls on October 12
- Daylight saving ends on its earliest possible date, November 1
- Thanksgiving Day falls on November 26
