= 37th Street =

37th Street may refer to:

- 37th Street (Austin), in Texas
- 37th Street (Manhattan), in New York
- 37th Street (Savannah), in Georgia

== See also ==
- 37th Street station (disambiguation)
