= Feldpost =

German military mail service

Feldpost (lit. “Field Post”) is the German military mail service. Its history dates back to the 18th century in the Kingdom of Prussia during the Seven Years' War and War of the Bavarian Succession and has existed ever since in different forms and shapes.

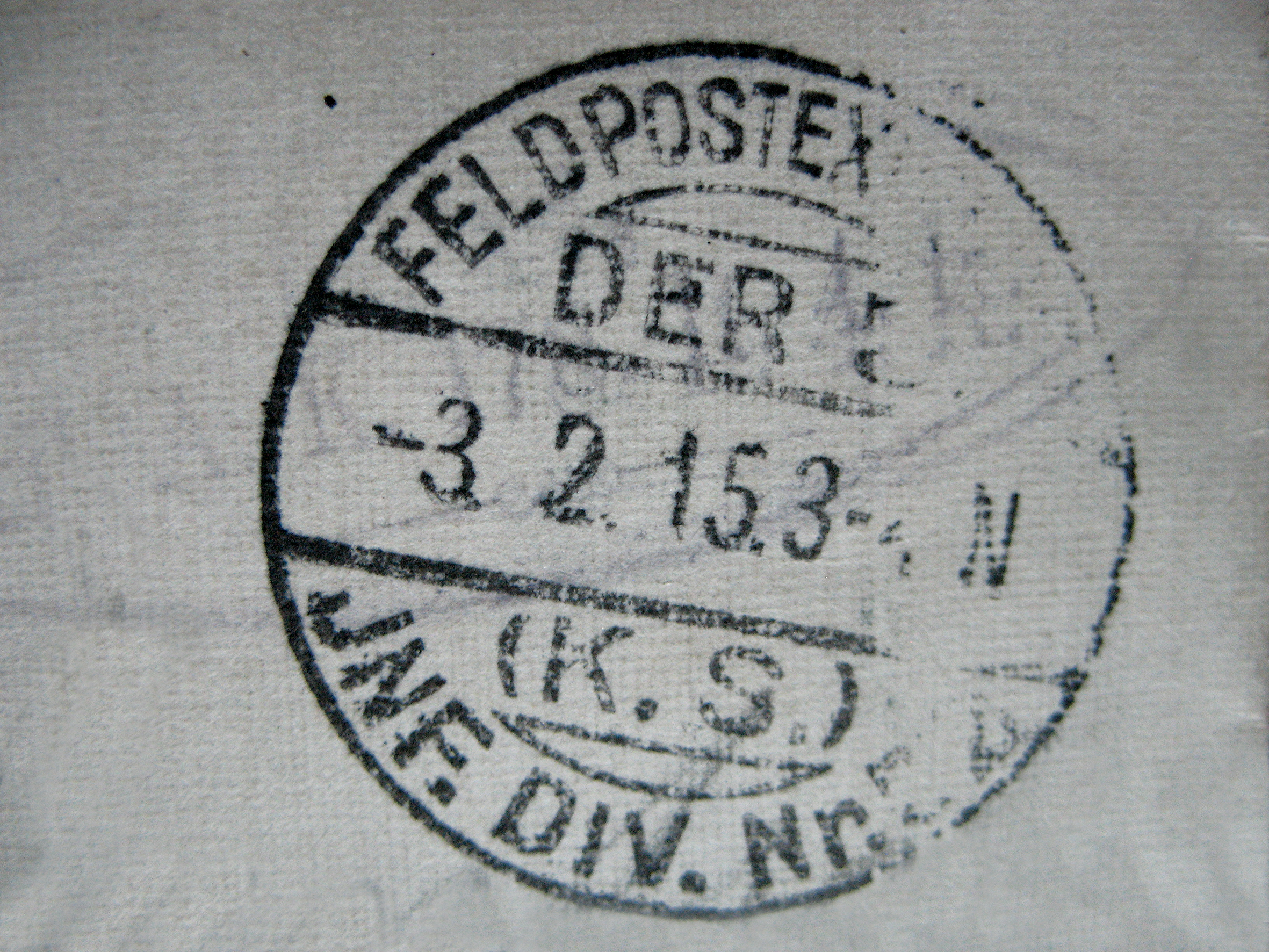
WW I - Feldpost - FELDPOSTEXPEDITION der 32 Div. 64 Inf. Brig. XII. (K. S.) - Dresden - vom 3.2.1915

== History ==
=== World War II ===
During 1937-39, the German Wehrmacht had a military mailing service that provided free postal services within Germany. On September 3, 1939, the first changes to the service occurred. Postcards and letters up to 250 g including newspapers could be mailed free of charge by the German para-military and military organizations. Later in 1939, packages weighing up to 1000 g were included at the nominal rate of 20 Reichspfennig fee. All German military branches had its own organic postal administration in charge of receiving and delivering mail. For Feldpost offices closest to the combat zone a mobile facility usually processed mail for all military branches.

In 1940 further changes were introduced followed through the rapid conquest of Europe. Eventually a series of postal agreements were set up between Germany and the occupied countries providing an extended usage of Feldpost service. Countries such as the Netherlands had close to 50,000 pro-Nazi volunteers that during the course of the war used the Feldpost service. Eventually these postal agreements were settled between Germany and other countries, including neutral countries such as Portugal, Spain, Switzerland, Sweden and Turkey, which had volunteers within the German forces.

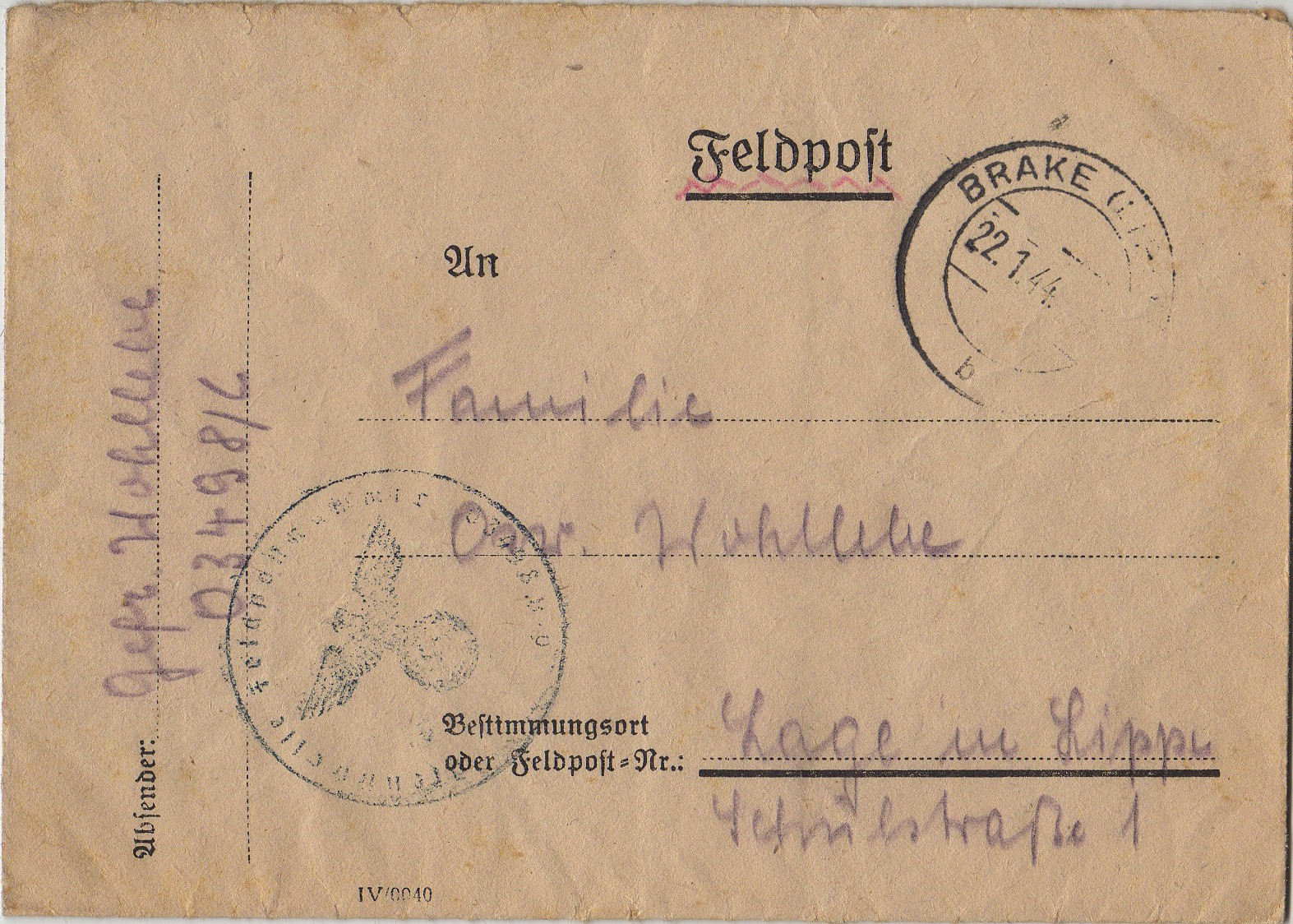
1944 German Feldpost cover with battalion code number 03498/L

To preserve the secrecy of troop movements, each battalion was assigned a five digit code number called Feldpost number (FPN). By the end of 1939, letter prefixes "L" and "M" were attached in front of each FPN to units belonging to the Luftwaffe and Kriegsmarine. A breakdown by military units was added by attaching letter prefixes "A" through "E" at the end of each FPN. The letter A generally signified headquarters company, the others stood for line companies.

The sequence of an FPN does not necessarily mean that the location of the units were at the same area. The postal cover/postcard itself was usually stamped with a military Feldpost Cancellation and Official Military Unit Seal. Feldpost numbers were sometimes reassigned to other units, particularly when a unit ceased to exist. Normally Feldpost mail could not be dispatched nor received by civil post offices. If a soldier wanted to send mail through a civil post office, full postage was collected.

== See also ==
- Field post office
- Feldpost number
