= 2037 =

Calendar year

2037 in various calendars
- Gregorian calendar: 2037; MMXXXVII
- Ab urbe condita: 2790
- Armenian calendar: 1486; ԹՎ ՌՆՁԶ
- Assyrian calendar: 6787
- Baháʼí calendar: 193–194
- Balinese saka calendar: 1958–1959
- Bengali calendar: 1443–1444
- Berber calendar: 2987
- British Regnal year: N/A
- Buddhist calendar: 2581
- Burmese calendar: 1399
- Byzantine calendar: 7545–7546
- Chinese calendar: 丙辰年 (Fire Dragon); 4734 or 4527 — to — 丁巳年 (Fire Snake); 4735 or 4528
- Coptic calendar: 1753–1754
- Discordian calendar: 3203
- Ethiopian calendar: 2029–2030
- Hebrew calendar: 5797–5798
- Hindu calendars
- Vikram Samvat: 2093–2094
- Shaka Samvat: 1958–1959
- Kali Yuga: 5137–5138
- Holocene calendar: 12037
- Igbo calendar: 1037–1038
- Iranian calendar: 1415–1416
- Islamic calendar: 1458–1459
- Japanese calendar: Reiwa 19 (令和１９年)
- Javanese calendar: 1970–1971
- Juche calendar: 126
- Julian calendar: Gregorian minus 13 days
- Korean calendar: 4370
- Minguo calendar: ROC 126 民國126年
- Nanakshahi calendar: 569
- Thai solar calendar: 2580
- Tibetan calendar: མེ་ཕོ་འབྲུག་ལོ་ (male Fire-Dragon); 2163 or 1782 or 1010 — to — མེ་མོ་སྦྲུལ་ལོ་ (female Fire-Snake); 2164 or 1783 or 1011
- Unix time: 2114380800 – 2145916799

2037 (MMXXXVII) will be a common year starting on Thursday of the Gregorian calendar, the 2037th year of the Common Era (CE) and Anno Domini (AD) designations, the 37th year of the 3rd millennium and the 21st century, and the 8th year of the 2030s decade.

== Predicted and scheduled events ==
- July 10 – The Apollo 10 lunar module, "Snoopy", will make a 4 million mile close approach to Earth.

=== Date unknown ===
- The Oxford English Dictionary is expected to publish its completed revised third edition.
