= Small nucleolar RNA Z37 =

Member of the C/D class of snoRNA

Small nucleolar RNA SNORD96 family
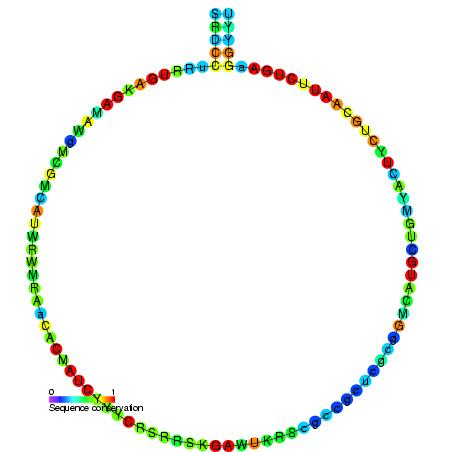
- Predicted secondary structure and sequence conservation of SNORD96

Identifiers
- Symbol: SNORD96
- Alt. Symbols: snoZ37
- Rfam: RF00055

Other data
- RNA type: Gene; snRNA; snoRNA; CD-box
- Domain: Eukaryota
- GO: GO:0006396 GO:0005730
- SO: SO:0000593
- PDB structures: PDBe

In molecular biology, snoRNA Z37 is a member of the C/D class of snoRNA which contain the C (UGAUGA) and D (CUGA) box motifs. Z37 acts as a methylation guide for 5.8S ribosomal RNA. This family contains a putative snoRNA found in the intron of the receptor for activated C kinase (RACK1) gene in mammals identified by the Rfam database. This family also includes human snoRNAs U96a and U96b and the apicomplexan snoRNA snr39b.
