= Federated portal network =

Federated portal network (FPN) is a framework for remote content sharing between enterprise portals. In a federated portal network each portal can act as a producer, exposing the content to other portals or as a consumer, using the content shared by other producer portals.

A federated portal network is used, for example, in order to distribute applications according to different service-level agreements (SLA), maintain autonomous portals that are independent of the central corporate portal or allow subsidiaries to lower total cost of ownership (TCO) by sharing applications from one producer portal.

FPN has currently two modes of operation: remote delta links (RDL) and remote role assignment (RRA).

== See also ==
- Federated content
