= Military mail =

Type of postal service

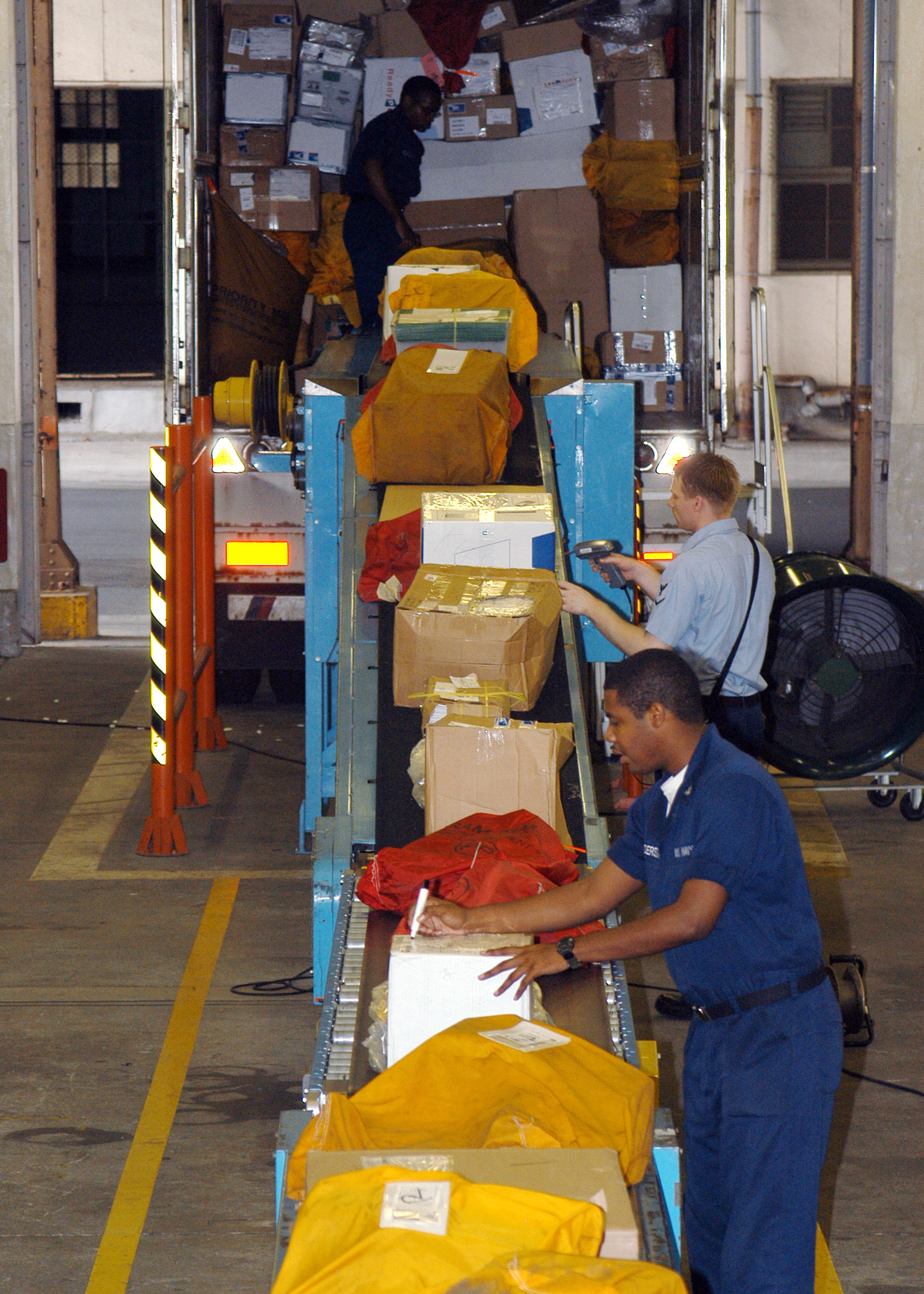
U.S. Navy sailors sorting mail at Fleet Mail Center Yokohama

Military mail, as opposed to civilian mail, refers to the postal services provided by armed forces that allow serving members to send and receive mail. Military mail systems are often subsidized to ensure that military mail does not cost the sender any more than normal domestic mail. In some cases, military personnel in a combat zone may post letters and packages to their home country free of charge. Modern military mail services are provided by most armed forces around the world. In some nations, individual service branches may run their own military mail program.

== History ==
Early forms of military mail may go back to the dawn of civilization. There is some evidence of it dating back to Ancient Egypt of the 2nd millennium BC.

The Anglo-Saxon Chronicle make mention of messengers being sent by King Edward the Elder (899–924) to recall members of the Kent fyrd, but it is generally regarded that the origins of the postal services stem from the King's Messengers (Nuncii et Cursores) of medieval times, in particular, the Royal Post established in the reign of King Edward IV (1461–83) to support his troops engaged in a war against Scotland.

=== Beginnings ===
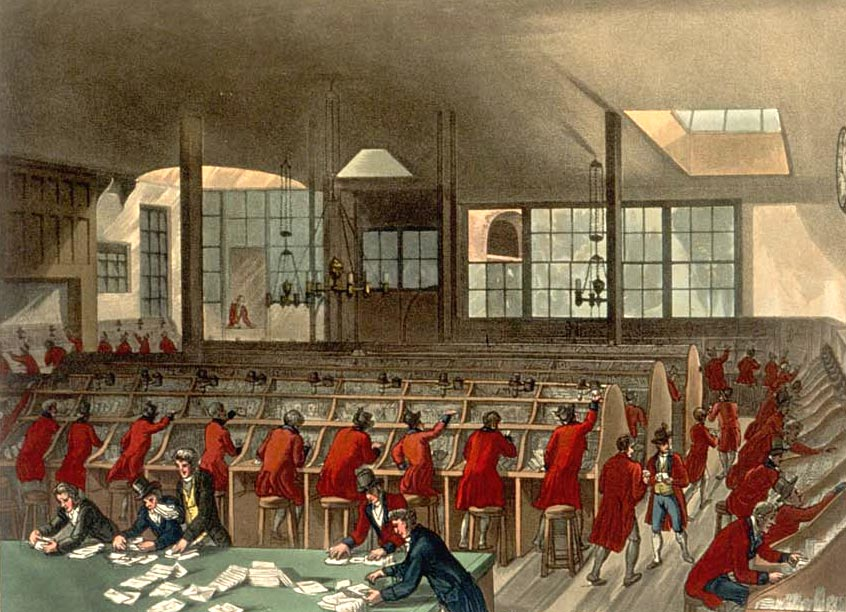
Clerks organising mail at a post office in London, circa 1808

In 1795, Parliament granted the penny postage concession to soldiers and sailors of the British Army and Royal Navy. Four years later, in 1799, the Duke of York appointed Henry Darlot, an ‘intelligent clerk’ from the General Post Office (GPO) as the Army Postmaster to accompany his expedition to Helder.

Thomas Reynolds, as the British Post Office Agent in Lisbon, Portugal was made responsible for coordinating the exchange of the British Army's mails at the port during the Peninsular War (1809–14). Two Sergeant Postmasters were appointed to work with Reynolds. The sergeants reported to the Duke of Wellington’s Superintendent of Military Communications, Major Scovell and later Lieutenant Colonel Sturgeon.

After complaints about the mail services to the British troops fighting in the Crimean War (1854–56) the Postmaster General authorised the secondment of GPO staff to organise and distribute mail in the theatre of war. A Base Army Post Office was established in Constantinople and a field post Office with the Army Headquarters at Balaklava.

A regular seaborne mail service was established between Varna and Constantinople. In response to demands made by Florence Nightingale, a method of transmitting money was devised to allow troops to transfer monies back to their families at home in the United Kingdom. This was designed to prevent drunkenness and became the world's first International Money Order Service. In its first month of operation £7,000 was remitted by the British troops.

=== Modern military mail provision ===
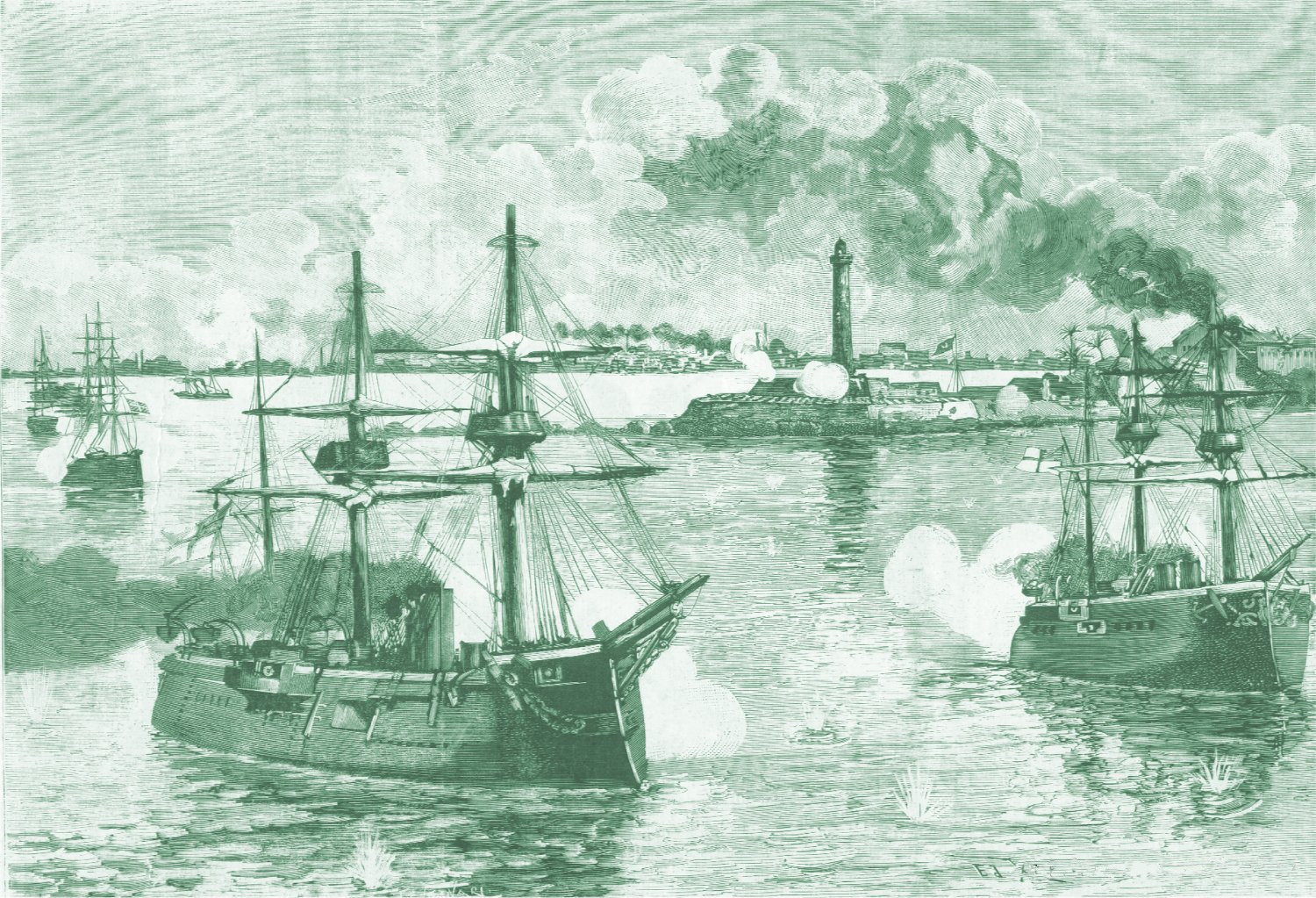
Bombardment of Alexandria, 1882. The first dedicated postal service to an army in the field was established during this campaign.

The military postal experience of the Crimea and the lessons learnt from the Indian Army encouraged the British Army to seriously review the arrangements for the provision of a postal service to the troops in the field. There were two opinions; firstly, that the Army run its own services as in the Peninsular War. Secondly, that civilians from the Post Office be responsible for the service as in the Crimean and Indian Army example.

The provision of a mail service to soldiers remained an ad hoc affair until 1882. In 1881 a rebellion broke out in Egypt which threatened Britain's passage to India through Suez. In response a British Expeditionary Force was sent to Egypt in the same year under the command of Sir Garnet Wolseley. This gave Lieutenant Colonel du Plat Taylor the opportunity to raise the matter of the postal corps again and it was agreed that an Army Post Office Corps (APOC) should be formed. Mails from Britain were despatched three times a week via the 'overland route' through France to Alexandria. The Army Post Offices offered a letter and parcel service and sold stamps and postal orders. In addition to the mail services, a free parcel service from the naval docks at Deptford was also set up. These parcels travelled by government store ships and transports. This service was the forerunner of the Military Forwarding Office (MFO) service which still exists today.

The expedition was successful and was the basis for establishing military mail in England and around the world. The unit received high praise from the commander-in-chief, who wrote:

The formation of a purely military postal department has been a tried for the first time in this war. It has been very successful.... I have much pleasure in bringing to the notice of the Secretary of State the admirable manner in which the Post Office Corps discharged its duties in Egypt ... Their services have been so valuable that I hope a similar corps may be employed on any future occasion.

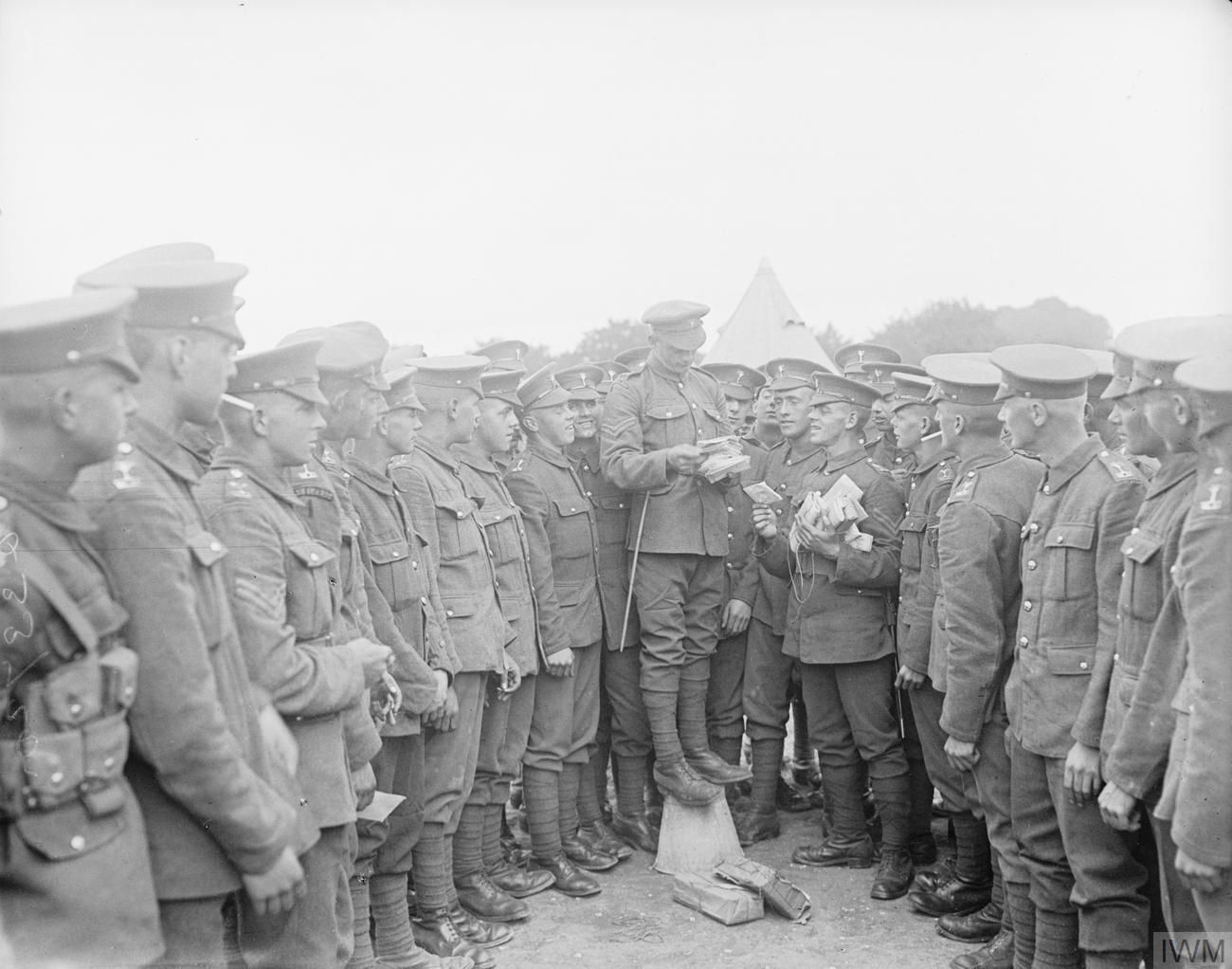
Soldiers during World War I at mail call

At the end of World War I (1914–1918), the Royal Engineers (Postal Section), along with the Royal Air Force (RAF), helped to pioneer international airmail services, by setting up airmail routes between Folkestone, England and Cologne, Germany to service the British Army of the Rhine.

== Selected modern services ==
=== British Forces Post Office (BFPO) ===
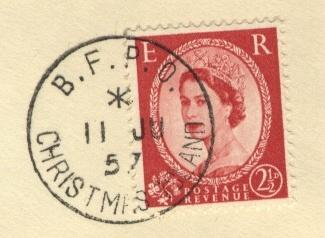
A British Wilding series postage stamp used at a BFPO on Christmas Island in 1957

The British Forces Post Office (BFPO) provides a postal service to HM Forces, separate from that provided by Royal Mail in the United Kingdom. BFPO addresses are used for the delivery of mail in the UK and around the world. BFPO is based at RAF Northolt in North West London.

The mission of BFPO is to "provide an efficient and effective Postal and Courier Service to sustain the fighting power of UK Armed Forces Worldwide." When sending mail from the UK to a member of HM Forces serving overseas, the sender must address it to the appropriate BFPO number, not to the country in which that person is based.

In 2012, in collaboration with Royal Mail, the BFPO introduced UK-style postcodes to help ordering items online because of problems with websites not recognising the BFPO addressing format. The addresses are assigned to the notional post town "BFPO", and as of 2012, all postcodes begin with "BF1".

=== German Armed Forces (Bundeswehr) ===
The Bundeswehr's military mail system is known in German as Feldpost; all mail to or from missions abroad is sent to Darmstadt (near Frankfurt am Main), where outbound mail is sent via land or air to the Bundeswehr's overseas stations, and inbound mail is dispatched to German domestic addresses, or to foreign destinations.

These include Kosovo, Bosnia, and Afghanistan. Feldpost addresses consist of the word "Feldpost" and a four-digit number beginning with "64" followed by two additional digits denoting the specific mission (e.g., 6401, etc.). Postal rates for the Feldpost are the same as domestic German postal rates. The Feldpost offers the same service to its customers as the Deutsche Post does within Germany.

=== Indian Army Postal Service Corps ===
Largely based on the system followed by the British Indian Army in the 19th century, the Indian Military provides the services of the Army Postal Service Corps which handles the mails for the three defence forces (Army, Navy, Air Force). The Corps however is part of the Indian Army, and is staffed by volunteers from the civilian Indian Postal Service.

Mail written to soldiers on field posting do not contain their regular postal address, but their number, rank, name, and Unit number ending with a suffix – "c/o xx A.P.O". Soldiers are not allowed to send mail from regular civil Post Offices even if their area of duty has such facilities.

=== U.S. Military Postal Service (MPS) ===
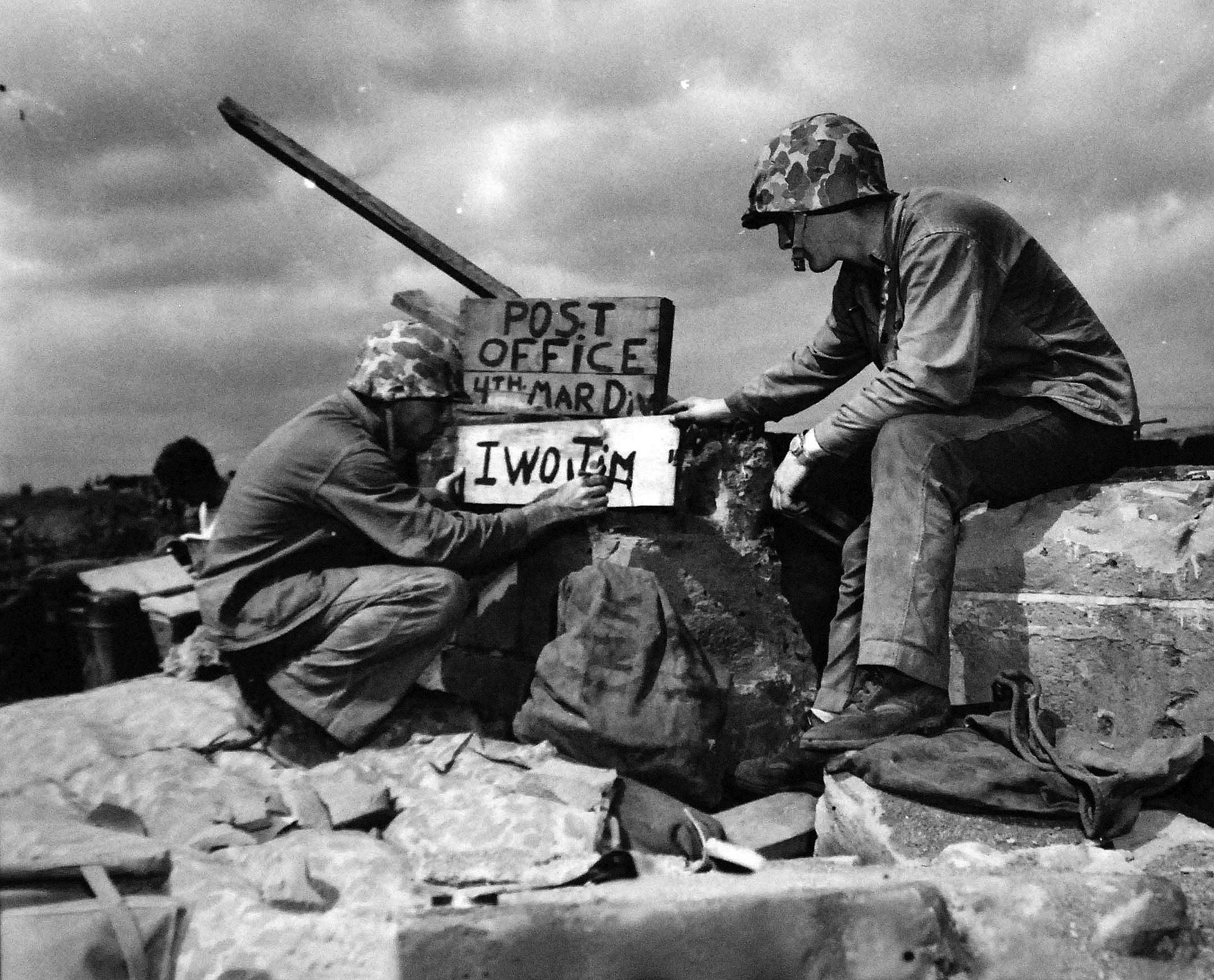
Marines from 4th Marine Division established a post office to distribute airdropped mail during the Battle of Iwo Jima.

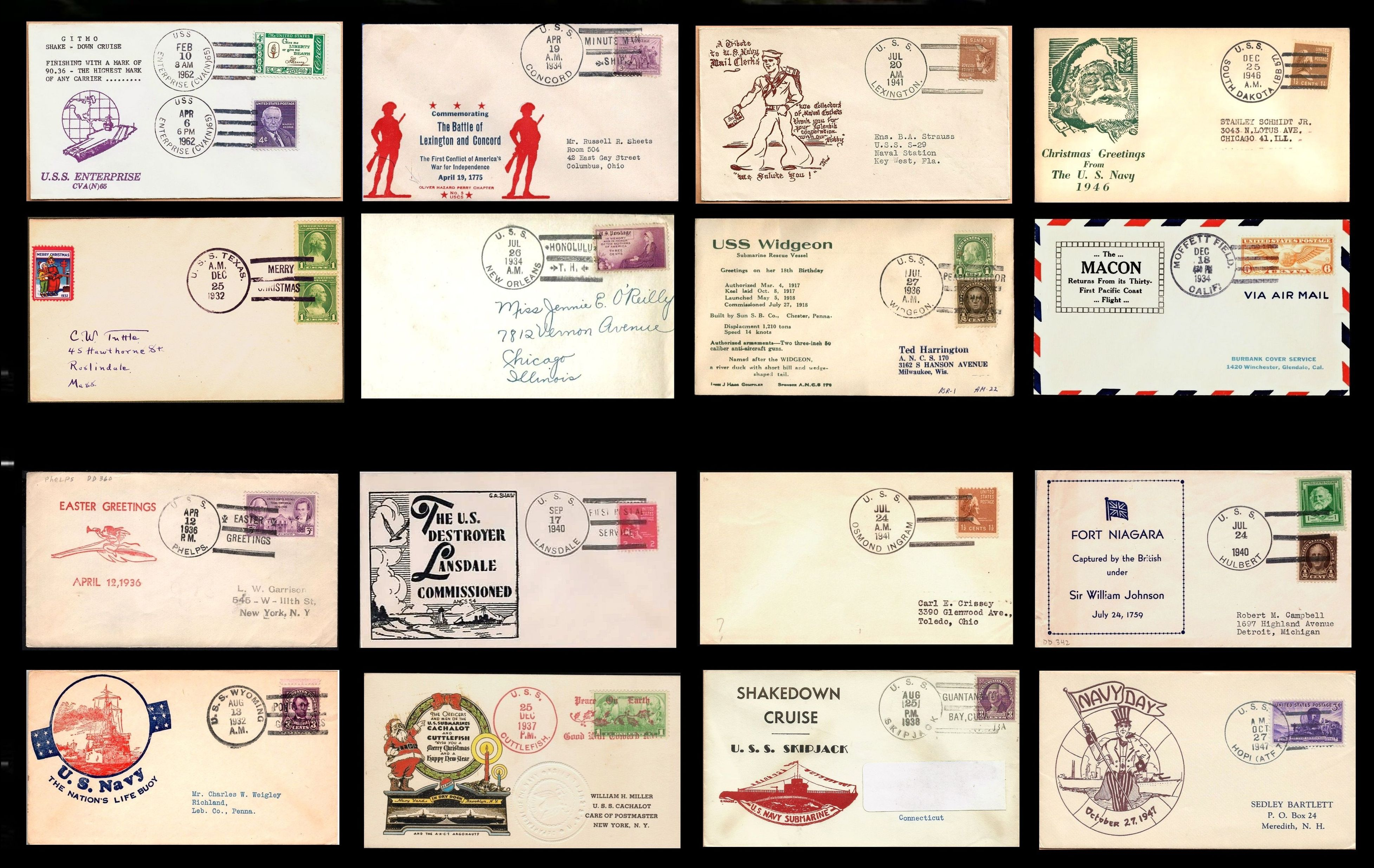
There is a U.S. naval post office aboard nearly every U.S. Navy ship, each with its own postal officer and postmark bearing the ship's name.

The MPS is required to adhere to United States Postal Service (USPS) rules, federal laws, and various international laws and agreements for movement of military mail into more than 85 countries. The individual military services (Army, Marine Corps, Navy, Air Force, Coast Guard) are each, themselves, responsible for the costs, manpower, and facilities of mail that travels through their own department. This is why the military services maintain command and control over all military postal assets, both in the United States and abroad.

The MPS also supports mail delivery for U.S. diplomatic facilities overseas and to deployed personnel in combat zones worldwide. Most USPS extra services, such as certified mail, registered mail, delivery confirmation, insured mail, certificate of mailing, return receipt, restricted delivery and return receipt for merchandise are available to the MPS. Mail sent from one military post office (MPO) to another MPO can be sent for free as inner- or intra-theater delivery service (IDS) as long as it does not transit the United States. Military postage rates are equivalent to U.S. domestic postage rates because the services pay the second destination transportation (SDT) costs to, from, and between MPOs. The postage paid on mail to and from MPOs only covers the cost of transporting the mail within the U.S. All military mail between the U.S. and overseas locations is subject to customs inspection in the country of destination, and customs declarations must normally be attached to packages and larger mail pieces.

MPOs operated or supported by the Army or Air Force use the city abbreviation APO (Army Post Office or Air Force Post Office), while Navy, Marine Corps, and Coast Guard use the city abbreviation FPO (Fleet Post Office).

USPS added Diplomatic Post Office (DPO) as a valid overseas address effective January 18, 2009. The city abbreviation is DPO. As of March 2009 there are sixteen U.S. embassy locations known as DPOs. The other approximately ninety overseas U.S. embassy post offices fall under the management oversight of the services and so are known as either APOs or FPOs.

The MPS is additionally responsible for postal services to some parts of the United States Antarctic Program, with an APO at USAP offices in Christchurch, NZ, at McMurdo Station, and at Amundsen-Scott South Pole Station.

=== World War I ===
In World War I, the United States War Department setup the Military Postal Express Service (MPES), sometimes shortened to Postal Express Service (PES), to take over military mail service during the war partly to prevent disclosure of sensitive information.

== Classified information ==
Military mail was subjected to censorship when it was the primary means for deployed servicemen to communicate with their families. The following text was printed on the message (non-address) side of standardized postcard "Subron 4 Standard Form No. F14 471-A-S/M Base. PH-7-15-41-20M." distributed to naval personnel at Pearl Harbor to communicate with their families following the Attack on Pearl Harbor:

NOTHING is to be written on this side except to fill in the data
specified. Sentences not required should be crossed out. IF ANYTHING
ELSE IS ADDED THE POSTCARD WILL BE DESTROYED.

   I am well                               (sick     -(serious
   I have been admitted to hospital as     (wounded  -(not serious
   Am getting on well. Hope to return to duty soon.

                                (Letter dated _____________________
   I have received your         (Telegram dated ___________________
                                (Parcel dated _____________________

   Letter follows at first opportunity.

   I have received no letter from you
              (for a long time.
              (lately.

Signature __________________________________________

Date _____________________

== Examples ==
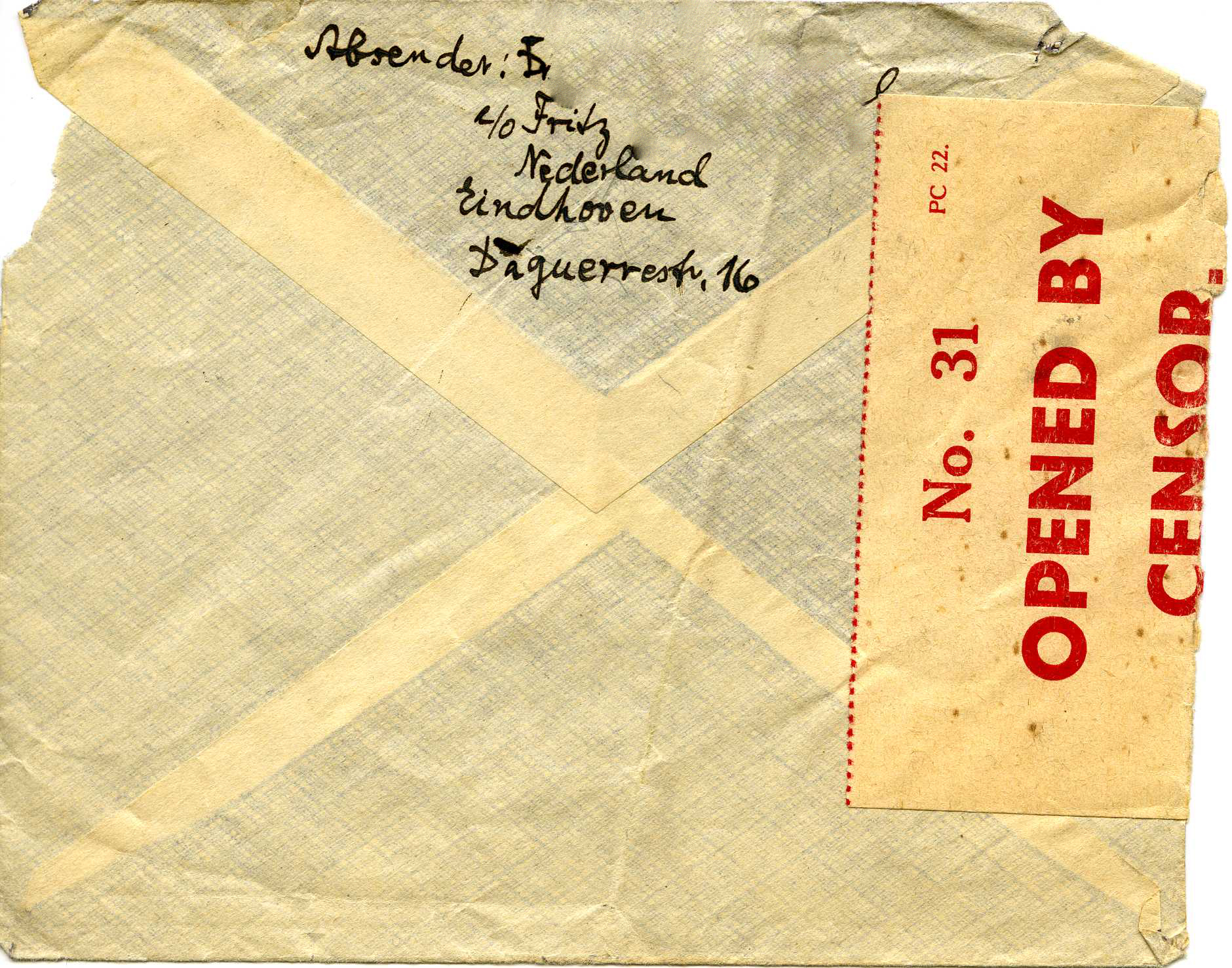
British censor sticker on a letter sent in late 1939 from The Netherlands to Palestine (then under British mandate)

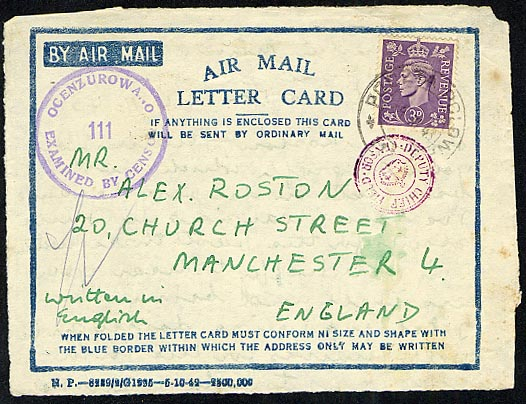
Air Mail Letter Card postmarked Poczta Polowa 111 on 4.11.1943 which at the time was located in Julis Camp near Qastina, Palestine.

- Austria
  - Feldpost
- Australia
  - Australian Defence Mail Service, considered an extension of the national postal operator, Australia Post
- Canada
  - Canadian Forces Postal Service, considered an extension of the national postal operator, Canada Post
- China
  - China Military Mail Service, considered an extension of the national postal operator, China Post
- Finland
  - Kenttäposti
- France
  - Bureau Postal Interarmées
- Germany
  - Feldpost
- India
  - Army Postal Service for Army and Airforce
  - F.M.O Fleet Mail office for Navy and Coast Guards
- Japan
  - Before end of WW2, the Imperial Japanese Army and Imperial Japanese Navy had its own military mail service (see ja:軍事郵便#日本の軍事郵便).
  - After WW2, the Japan Self-Defense Forces mail service are considered a part of the national postal operator, Japan Post
- Poland
  - Poczta Polowa
- Russia
  - GFS Russia
- Serbia
  - Vojna Pošta (VP)
- Sweden
  - Fältpost
- Switzerland
  - Feldpost
- United Kingdom
  - British Forces Post Office
- United States
  - Army/Air Force Post Office (APO) – for U.S. Army, U.S. Air Force and U.S. Space Force postal facilities
  - Fleet Post Office (FPO) – for U.S. Navy, U.S. Marine Corps and U.S. Coast Guard postal facilities
  - Diplomatic Post Office (DPO) – for U.S. embassies.

== See also ==
- List of established military terms
- 6888th Central Postal Directory Battalion – US Army all-Black women's battalion
- Diplomatic bag – Transported package of a diplomatic mission, exempt from inspection or seizure
- Field post office – Post office set up for a military unit in the field
- Postage stamps and postal history of the United States
