= 37th Regiment =

37th Regiment or 37th Infantry Regiment may refer to:

- 37 (Wessex and Welsh) Signal Regiment, a unit of the United Kingdom Army
- 37th Infantry Regiment (United States)
- 37th Armor Regiment (United States), a unit of the United States Army
- Combat Logistics Regiment 37, a unit of the United States Marine Corps

American Civil War Regiments

- 37th Illinois Volunteer Infantry Regiment
- 37th Iowa Volunteer Infantry Regiment
- 37th New Jersey Volunteer Infantry Regiment
- 37th Wisconsin Volunteer Infantry Regiment

== See also ==
- 37th Division (disambiguation)
- 37th Brigade (disambiguation)
- 37th Squadron (disambiguation)
