= 37 =

37 may refer to:

- 37 (number), the natural number following 36 and preceding 38
- 37 BC
- AD 37
- 1937
- 2037

== Media ==
- 37 (film), a 2016 film about the murder of Kitty Genovese
- 37 (album) by King Never, 2013
- Thirty Seven, a Karma to Burn song from the album Almost Heathen, 2001
- 37, a DEVO song found on Hardcore Devo: Volume Two

== Science ==
- Rubidium, an alkali metal in the periodic table
- 37 Fides, an asteroid in the asteroid belt

== Other uses ==
- Route 37 (MBTA), a bus route in Boston, Massachusetts, US
- 37 (New Jersey bus), a NJ Transit bus route in New Jersey, US

== See also ==
- 37th (disambiguation)
- List of highways numbered 37
