= Feldpost number =

Postcode for military items during WW II

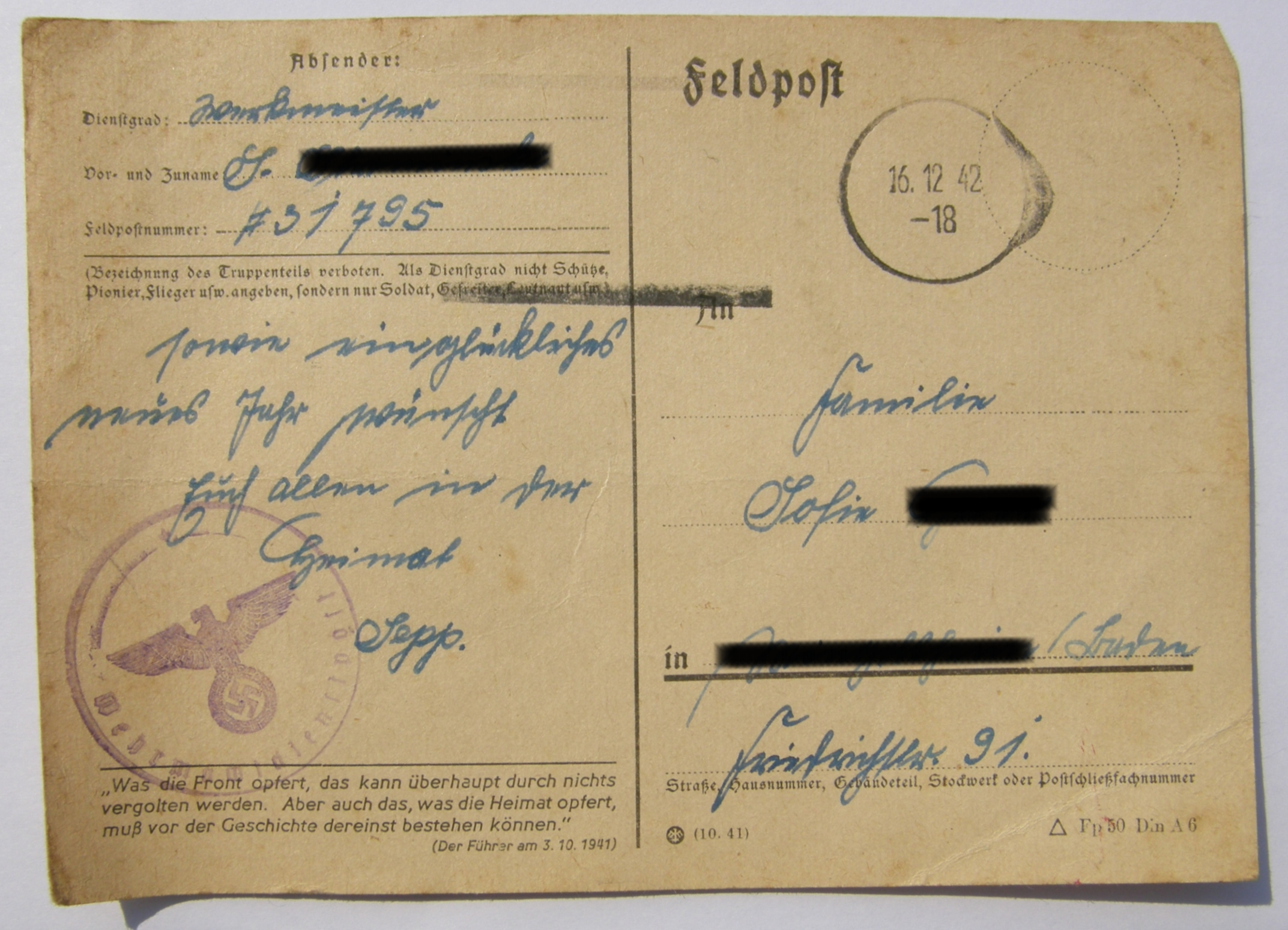
German postcard during WW II

The German Feldpost number (FPN) (German: Feldpostnummer) was a sort of postcode used for items sent by either military mail or airmail. Every unit had its own code.

== Structure ==
During World War II, the FPN usually consisted of five digits. The system began with 00 001 and ended with the 80 000 numbers. Six digit codes were used prior to the beginning of the war as exercise post numbers (German: Übungspostnummern), and during it as collective post numbers (German: Sammel-Feldpostnummern) for places with a higher concentration of troops, such as 123 321 for Festung Posen.

Letters following the digits indicated under which command the recipient was, for instance operation headquarters or companies, while letters preceding the numbers stood for the following:

- L for units of the Luftwaffe
- M for units of the navy (German: Kriegsmarine)
- SCH for units involved in the coastal protection

The letter A generally signified headquarters company, the others stood for line companies. The sequence of a Feldpost number did not necessarily mean that the location of the units were at the same area. It was not unusual for the same feldpost number to be used for different units throughout the war. As one unit would be destroyed, then the number might have been reallocated at a later date. The Feldpost number of a unit was also changed periodically for security purposes.

The reason behind the FPN was to keep the location of troops and certain divisions secret. Relatives received the respective FPN of the soldier through messaging cards (German: Benachrichtigungskarten) which allowed for their mail to reach the soldier in the reasonable time of about two weeks.

As each German U-boat had its own Feldpost number it could be used to refer to the ship in a secure way, for example in recalling the crew from public places.
