= 37 Squadron =

37 Squadron or 37th Squadron may refer to:

- No. 37 Squadron RAAF, a unit of the Royal Australian Air Force
- No. 37 Squadron RAF, a unit of the United Kingdom Royal Air Force
- No. 37 Squadron RAF Regiment, a former unit of the United Kingdom Royal Air Force
- 37th Bomb Squadron, a unit of the United States Air Force
- 37th Airlift Squadron, a unit of the United States Air Force
- VFA-37 (Strike Fighter Squadron 37, United States), a unit of the United States Navy

== See also ==
- 37th Division (disambiguation)
- 37th Brigade (disambiguation)
- 37th Regiment (disambiguation)
