= 37th Street (Austin) =

Street in Austin, Texas, U.S.

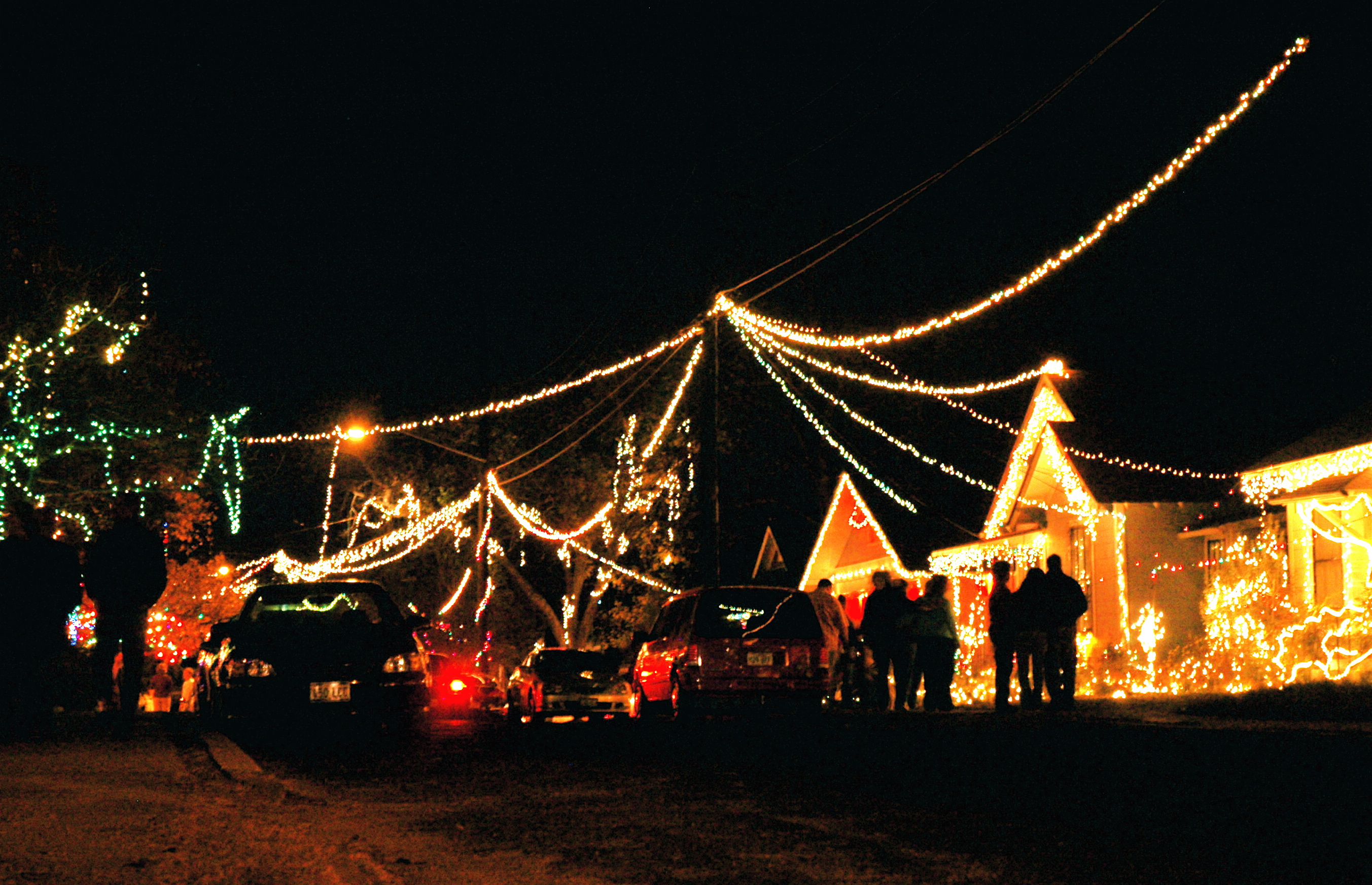
- Lights along the street in 2006
- Frequency: annually
- Locations: West 37th Street between Guadalupe Street and Home Lane; Austin, Texas
- Coordinates: 30.301431°N 97.737565°W
- Years active: mid-1980s to present
- Participants: Tens of thousands

37th Street is a street in Austin, Texas, known for its many houses that are decorated with Christmas lights. The tradition attracts tens of thousands of visitors each year, though neighbor participation has decreased the past few years due to the original residents having moved away and more students renting homes in the neighborhood.

== History ==
In the mid-1980s, a couple of neighbors began bridging the street with Christmas lights left by other neighbors and found at fraternity and sorority houses near the University of Texas. Soon, other neighbors followed suit. Early participant Bob Godbout recalled, "It didn't start out as Christmas lights. It started out as a wild art form and stayed that way."

In 1993, city workers removed lights strung from city poles due to fire hazard concerns. In response, street residents turned off all lights, resulting in numerous complaints directed at the city from visitors expecting light displays. City workers returned the following day to reinstall the lights.

== See also ==
- Christmas decoration
- Christmas lighting technology
- Christmas market
