= 37th Iowa Infantry Regiment =

- Iowa state flag
- Active: December 15, 1862, to May 24, 1865
- Country: United States
- Allegiance: Union
- Branch: Infantry

The 37th Iowa Infantry Regiment, nicknamed the "Graybeard Regiment", was an infantry regiment that served in the Union Army during the American Civil War.

== Service ==
The 37th Iowa Infantry was organized at Muscatine, Iowa, and mustered in for three years of Federal service on December 15, 1862. The regiment was unique in that it was composed entirely of men not liable for military service. All men enlisted had to be at least 45 years old. It spent most of its service guarding prisoner of war camps and supply trains.

The regiment was created for political reasons as a way of proving that men well above normal military age were willing to volunteer. While most of its members were in their 40s, 50s, and 60s, it is recorded that a few were in their 70s and at least one man claimed to be 80. It was generally understood that the regiment was to be limited to light duties like guarding supply trains, but there was nothing official about this. Most of the 37th Iowa's members had sons and/or grandsons serving in other regiments, and none could list Iowa as their birthplace since all of them had been born before it was even settled (settlement of the region had begun in 1833).

The regiment was mustered out on May 24, 1865.

== Total strength and casualties ==
A total of 1,041 men served in the 37th Iowa at one time or another during its existence. While only 3 men from the 37th Iowa died in action, over 145 succumbed to disease.

== Commanders ==
- Colonel George W. Kincaid

== See also ==
- List of Iowa Civil War Units
- Iowa in the American Civil War
