= 37th SS Volunteer Cavalry Division =

- 37. SS-Freiwilligen-Kavallerie-Division
- Insignia of the 37th SS Volunteer Cavalry Division
- Active: February – May 1945
- Country: Nazi Germany
- Branch: (Schutzstaffel) Waffen-SS
- Type: Cavalry
- Size: Division
- Motto: "Meine Ehre heißt Treue!"
- Engagements: Second World War; Eastern Front

Commanders
- Notable commanders: SS-Standartenführer Waldemar Fegelein (26 February 1945 – March 1945); SS-Standartenführer Karl Gesele (March 1945 – May 1945)

37th SS Volunteer Cavalry Division (German: 37. SS-Freiwilligen Kavallerie-Division) was a German Cavalry division of the Waffen-SS during the Second World War. It was formed in February 1945 from the personnel and equipment of the 8th SS Cavalry Division and the 22nd SS Volunteer Cavalry Division. In addition to this, many under-age German, Hungarian and 'Volksdeutsche' helped make up the division. The division was intended to have three cavalry regiments comprising two battalions each, however, due to the inadequate amount of men and equipment it could only field two understrength regiments as its main combat units. The division was initially commanded by SS-Oberführer Waldemar Fegelein until March when he was replaced by SS-Standartenführer Karl Gesele. The unit saw action against the Soviets as a part of the 6th Panzer Army during the final weeks of the war, before surrendering to Americans in Austria in May 1945. Although the division allegedly bore the name 'Lützow', the name is not found in Feldpostübersicht (field-post/unit directories), official order of battles, or other archival files.

== Organization ==
- SS Cavalry Regiment 92
- SS Cavalry Regiment 93
- SS Cavalry Regiment 94
- SS Artillery unit Battalion 37 (Two batteries with 10.5 cm leFH 18)
- SS Reconnaissance Battalion 37
- SS Panzerjäger Battalion 37 (One company equipped with a Hetzer)
- SS Pionier Battalion 37
- SS Signals Company 37
- SS Medical Battalion 37
- SS Nachschub Troop 37
- Feldersatz Battalion 37

== See also ==
- List of German divisions in World War II
- List of Waffen-SS divisions
- List of SS personnel
- 22nd SS Volunteer Cavalry Division Maria Theresia
- 8th SS Cavalry Division Florian Geyer
