= 37th Bomb Squadron =

US Air Force unit

37th Bomb Squadron

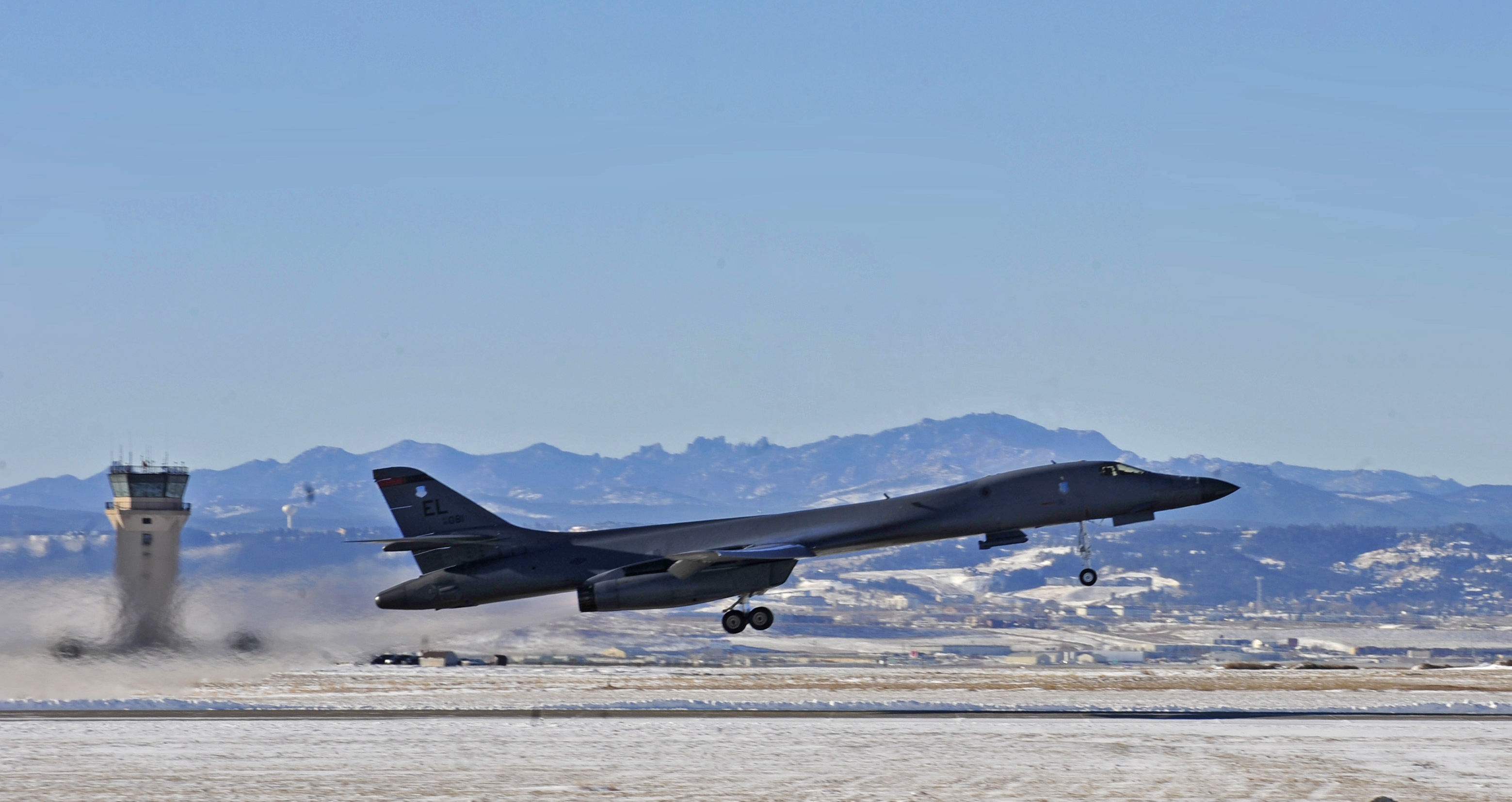
- A B-1 Lancer bomber launches from Ellsworth AFB 2 December 2015 (Note: The B-1 is one of many aircraft participating in the first large force exercise in the newly expanded Powder River Training Complex.)
- Active: 1917–1919; 1933–1938; 1940–1945; 1947–1948; 1952–1958; 1977–1982; 1987–present
- Country: United States
- Branch: United States Air Force
- Role: Heavy bomber
- Part of: Global Strike Command
- Garrison/HQ: Ellsworth Air Force Base
- Nickname: Tigers
- Motto: “Harrumph!”
- Mascot: Billy the tiger
- Engagements: American Theater (World War II) Mediterranean Theater of Operations; European Theater of Operations; Korean War; Operation Desert Fox; Operation Allied Force; Operation Enduring Freedom; Operation Iraqi Freedom; Operation Odyssey Dawn; Operation Freedom's Sentinel; Operation Inherent Resolve
- Decorations: Distinguished Unit Citation Air Force Meritorious Unit Award Air Force Outstanding Unit Award with "V" Device French Croix de Guerre with Palm Republic of Korea Presidential Unit Citation

Insignia
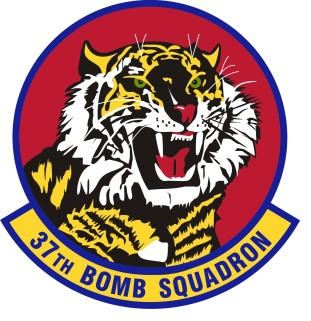
- 37th Bombardment Squadron emblem (Note: Approved 27 December 1956. Description: On a shield red, edged black, a growling royal Bengal tiger in his natural colors, black, white, light tan: eyeballs light green tongue red. When approved in 1956, the emblem was on a shield, not a disc. Maurer, Combat Squadrons, p. 175. Robertson does not give a date for the change to a disc.)

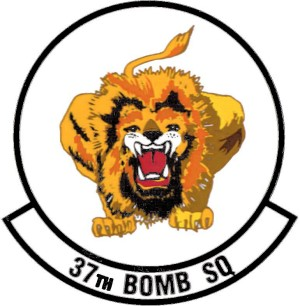
- 37th Bomb Squadron emblem (Note: Modified and restored c. February 1994. Endicott says the 1934 emblem was restored (on a disc) during the CSAF emblem review. Robertson indicates the 1956 emblem is current, but does not give a date for its reinstatement.)

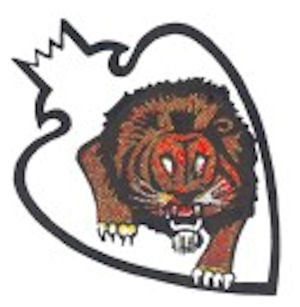
- 37th Pursuit Squadron emblem (Note: Approved 25 July 1934.)

The 37th Bomb Squadron is part of the 28th Bomb Wing at Ellsworth Air Force Base, South Dakota. It operates Rockwell B-1 Lancer aircraft providing strategic bombing capability.

The squadron is one of the oldest in the United States Air Force, its origins dating to 13 June 1917, when the 37th Aero Squadron was organized at Kelly Field, Texas. The squadron deployed to France as part of the American Expeditionary Force during World War I and served as a training unit until returning to the US for demobilization. It was active in the interwar years at Langley Field, Virginia as a pursuit and attack squadron.

The squadron saw combat as the 37th Bombardment Squadron, a Martin B-26 Marauder unit in the Mediterranean Theater of Operations during World War II, earning two Distinguished Unit Citations (DUC) for its performance. It was inactivated after the war's end, although it was briefly active as a paper unit in 1947–1948.

The squadron was again activated during the Korean War, when it replaced a reserve unit that was being returned to reserve duty. Flying night intruder missions with Douglas B-26 Invaders, the squadron earned another DUC before the truce in July 1953. In 1955 it returned to the United States and became one of the first jet tactical bomber units, flying Martin B-57 Canberras and Douglas B-66 Destroyers. After a brief deployment to England, the squadron once again inactivated.

In 1977, the 37th became part of the Strategic Air Command, flying Boeing B-52 Stratofortresses until 1982. It assumed its present role in 1987.

The squadron is an honorary member of the NATO Tiger Association

== History ==
=== World War I ===
Established on 13 June 1917 at Kelly Field in Texas, the 37th Aero Squadron moved to France in early September. After a short spell at Étampes (18–23 September), it settled at the Issoudun Aerodrome, participating at the installation of the Third Aviation Instruction Center. Once declared operational, it started flight training for newly arrived American pilots and crew members.

Reaching Bordeaux c. 6 January 1919, the squadron stayed there until 18 March, when it board a transport to bring it back to the United States where it was demobilized.

=== Inter-war years ===
Reactivated at Langley Field, Virginia in September 1933 at as the 37th Pursuit Squadron, the squadron was attached to the 8th Pursuit Group and equipped with Curtiss P-6 Hawks, in March 1935 it became the 37th Attack Squadron with Curtiss A-8 Shrike and Northrop A-17 Nomad attack aircraft. In January 1938, the squadron was inactivated.

=== World War II ===
==== Early operations and training ====
The squadron was redesignated the 37th Bombardment Squadron and activated at Barksdale Field, Louisiana on 1 February 1940 with Douglas B-18 Bolo bombers as one of the original squadrons of the 28th Composite Group, which was training for deployment to Alaska. However, when the 28th Group moved to Alaska in February 1941, the squadron remained in the United States, at Lowry Field, Colorado. In its place, the 73d Bombardment Squadron of the 17th Bombardment Group moved to Alaska in March. The exchange of squadrons was completed in April and May 1941, when the 37th was reassigned to the 17th Group and the 73d to the 28th Group. In June, the squadron moved to Pendleton Field, Oregon and was collocated with its parent group for the first time since the squadron's 1940 activation.

At Pendleton, the squadron transitioned into the North American B-25 Mitchell medium bomber, when the 17th Group became the first Air Corps unit to receive the new bomber. In August, it received the updated B-25B, that had a much heavier defensive armament, dictated by the results of combat reports coming in from Europe. Following the attack on Pearl Harbor, the 37th flew antisubmarine patrols off the Pacific coast until about March 1942. It moved to Lexington County Airport, South Carolina, on 9 February 1942 in order to meet the greater threat from German submarines operating off the East Coast.

==== Doolittle raid ====
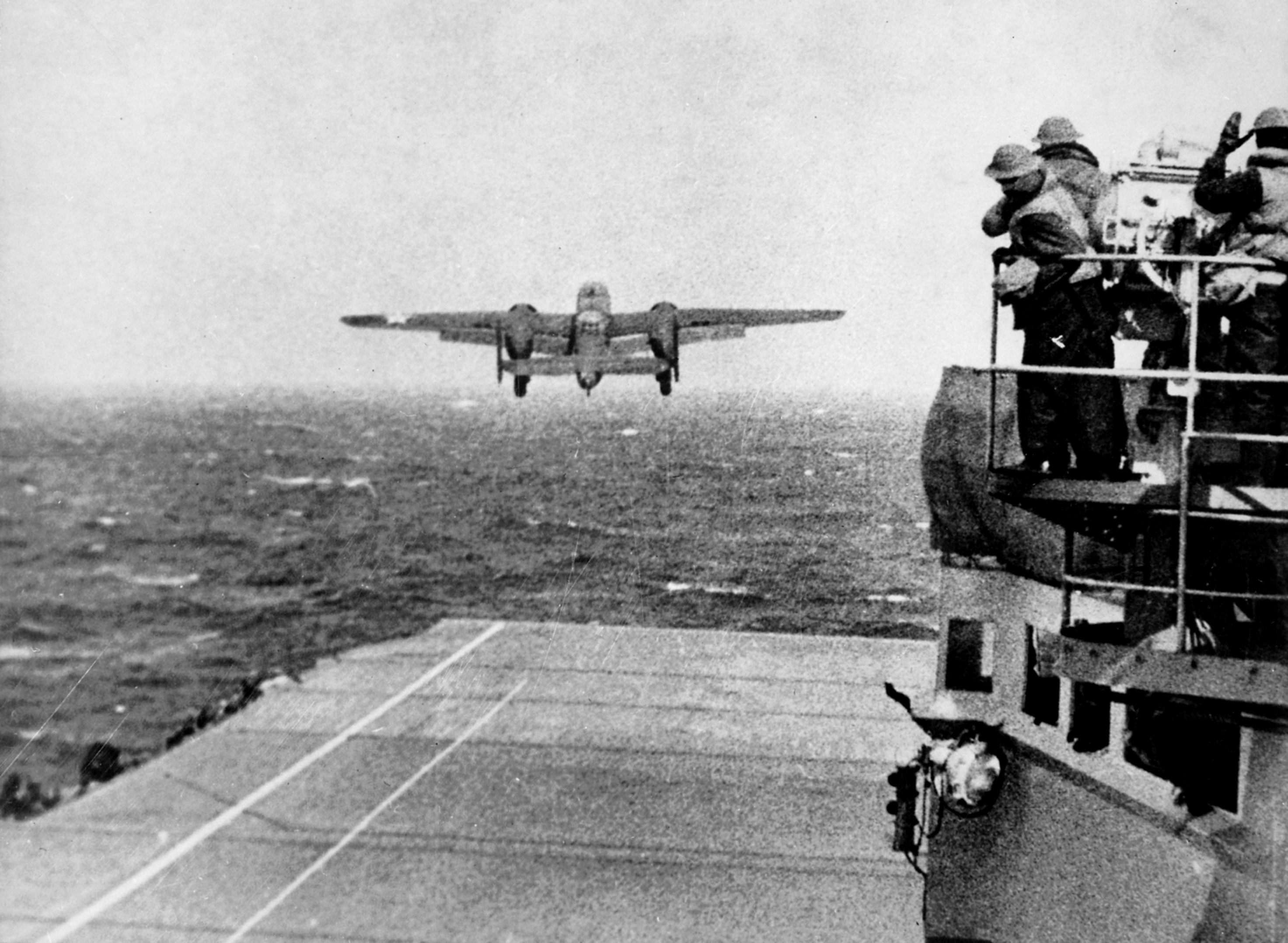
B-25 taking off for the Doolittle Raid

Planning for a retaliatory bombing raid on Japan began in December 1941, and twenty-four B-25Bs were diverted from the 17th Bombardment Group, which was the only B-25 unit in the Air Corps, and volunteers from its four squadrons, including the 37th, were recruited, the crews being told only that this was a secret and dangerous mission. The volunteers trained at Eglin Field, Florida. Upon completion of training, they left Eglin for McClellan Field, California for final modifications to the B-25s before moving to Naval Air Station Alameda, where the bombers were loaded on the USS Hornet (CV-8) for the raid.

==== Combat operations in the Mediterranean ====
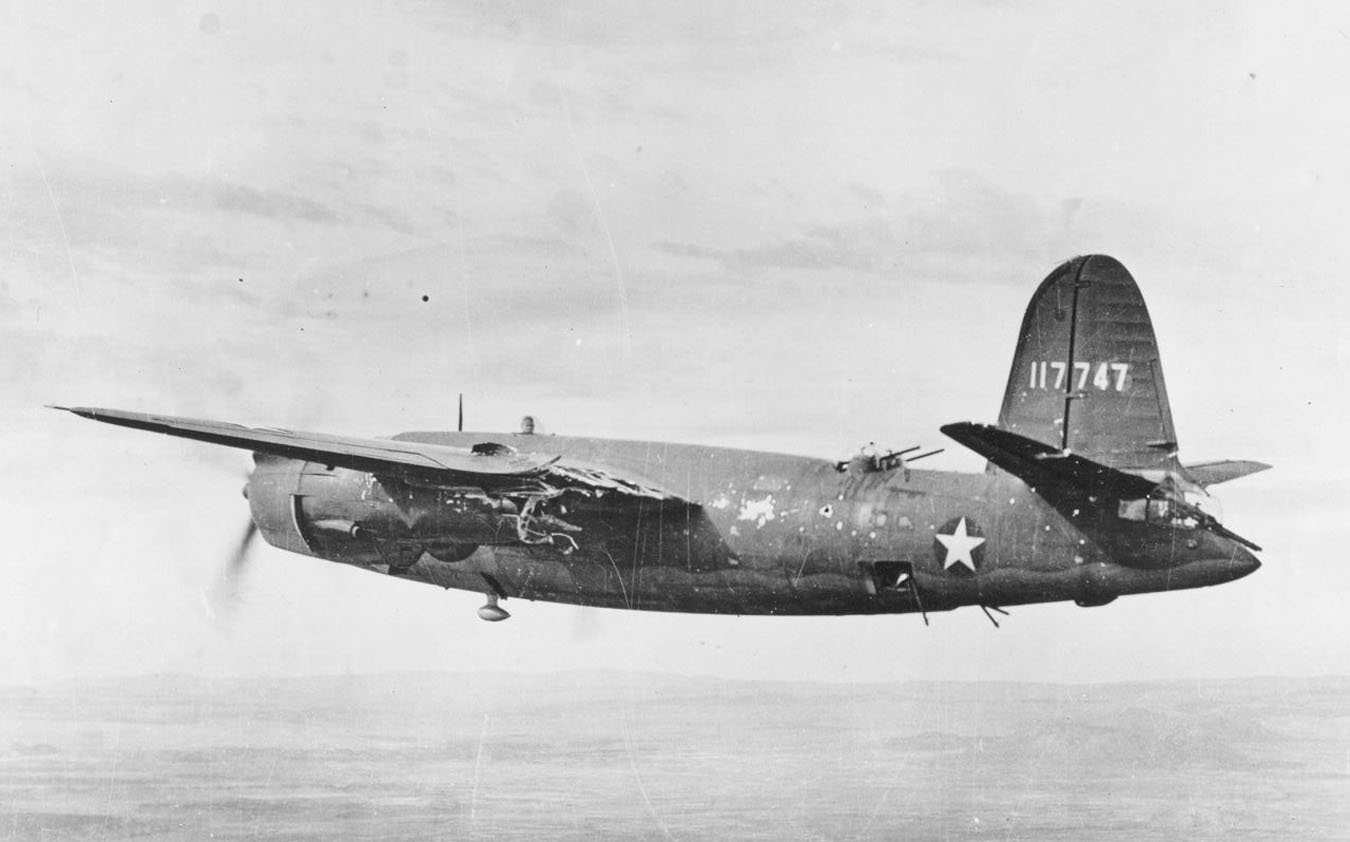
Squadron B-26B Marauder with extensive flak damage over Europe. (Note: Aircraft is Martin B-26B-1-MA Marauder, serial 41-17747 Earthquake McGoon. It has flak damage to the left engine nacelle, left wing and wheel well. Note the missing landing gear doors.)

The remainder of the squadron remained in Columbia, flying antisubmarine patrols until 23 June when it moved to Barksdale Field, where it began transitioning into the Martin B-26 Marauder.

In November 1942, the squadron deployed to North Africa, arriving at Telergma Airport, Algeria in December 1942 following Operation Torch's initial landings, becoming part of XII Bomber Command. The squadron flew interdiction and close air support, missions, bombing bridges, rail lines, marshalling yards, harbors, shipping, gun emplacements, troop concentrations and other enemy targets in Algeria and later Tunisia supporting American and later Allied ground forces as they moved east, contributing to the defeat of Axis forces in Africa by May 1943.

During 1943, the 37th participated in Operation Corkscrew, the reduction of Pantelleria. It supported Operation Husky, the Allied invasion of Sicily and Operation Avalanche, the invasion of Italy. During the drive toward Rome, the squadron was awarded a Distinguished Unit Citation for its attacks on airfields near Rome on 13 January 1944. It was also awarded the French Croix de Guerre with Palm for its operations in Italy between April and June.

The unit provided tactical air support in the liberation of Sardinia and Corsica. From airfields in Corsica, the 432d supported Allied ground forces during Operation Dragoon, the invasion of southern France in August 1944. It moved to Southern France and bombed enemy targets during the Allied drive northward. It earned a second Distinguished Unit Citation for bombing attacks on enemy defenses near Schweinfurt, Germany just before the end of the war on 10 April 1945.

The squadron remained in Europe after V-E Day. It became part of the occupation forces, and participated in the disarmament of Germany. It moved to the American Occupation Zone in Austria. The squadron returned to France to stage for its return to the United States, where it was inactivated in late November 1945.

=== Korean War ===
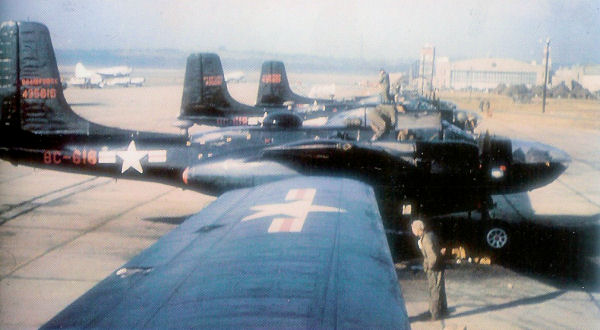
Glass nosed Douglas B-26 Invaders in Korea

The squadron was reactivated in May 1947 by Tactical Air Command but it was not manned or equipped. It was inactivated in September 1948.

The squadron was activated at Pusan East Air Base, Korea on 10 May 1952, when it assumed the mission, personnel and Douglas B-26 Invaders of the 729th Bombardment Squadron. The 729th was a reserve unit that had been called to active duty for the Korean War and was being returned to reserve status. The squadron continued the night bombing operations of the 729th, concentrating on attacks on enemy lines of communication and troop concentrations. In 1953, the squadron focused on attacking rail rolling stock, facilities and supplies. Using Invaders with glass noses, (Note: Some of the unit's B-26s had solid noses with machine guns mounted in them.) the squadron developed techniques for conducting armed reconnaissance missions against locomotives and freight cars and began flying missions employing these tactics in February 1953. It participated in Operation Spring Thaw and starting in March, attacked southbound routes along the East Coast of North Korea. It continued operations until the July 1953 truce, and was awarded its third DUC for its operations.

The 37th remained in Korea as a precaution against the resumption of hostilities. In September 1954, it relocated to Miho Air Base, Japan, It remained in Japan until the spring of 1955, when it returned to the United States for conversion to jet bombers.

=== Tactical jet bomber operations ===
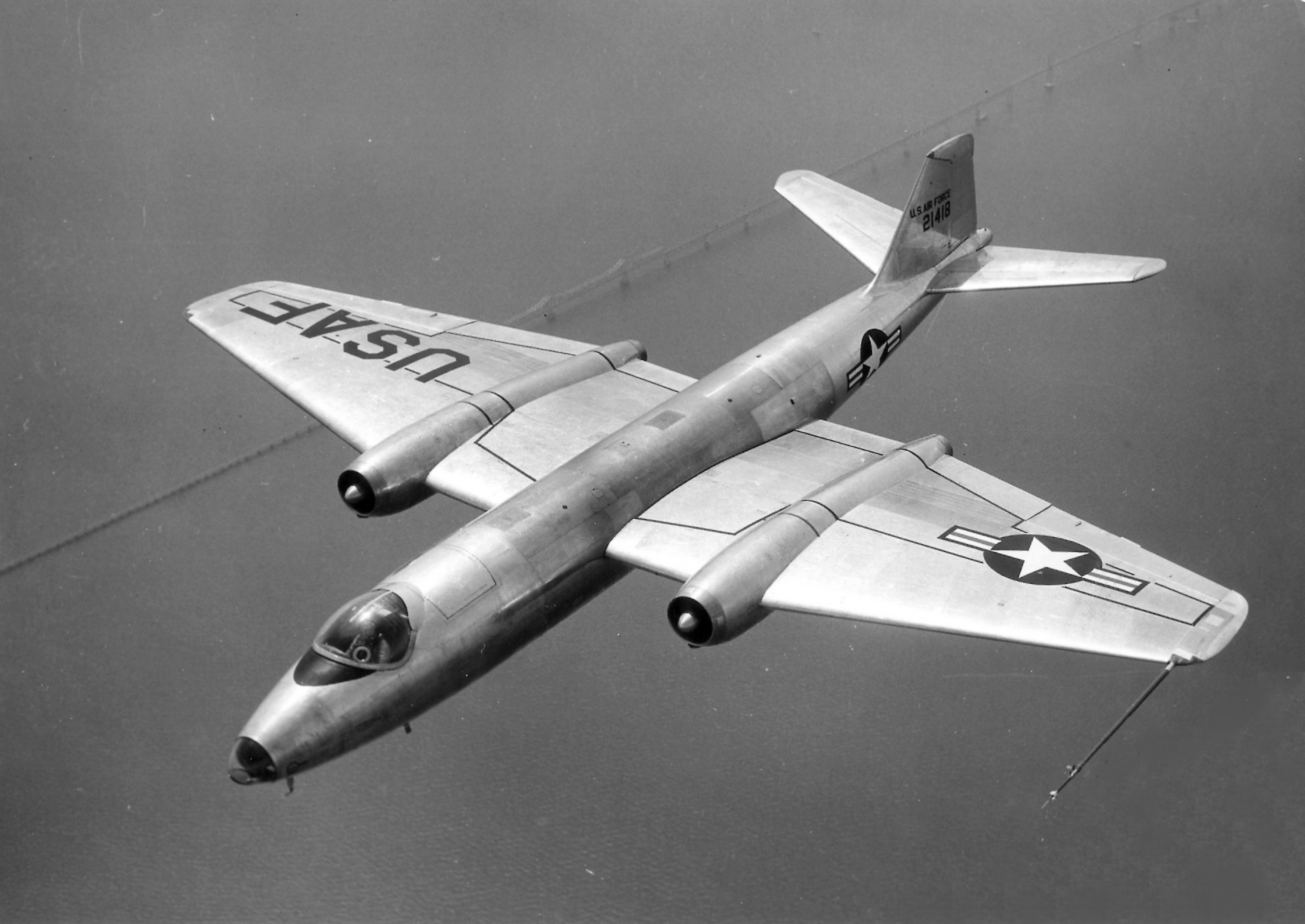
Martin B-57A

Re-equipped with Martin B-57 Canberra jet bombers and conducted evaluation testing of the aircraft at Eglin Air Force Auxiliary Field No. 9; transitioned to Douglas B-66B Destroyers in 1956, the first squadron to receive the new tactical bomber. Deployed to RAF Sculthorpe, England briefly in 1958 before returning to Eglin and performing more testing on B-66s with Jet Assisted Take Off (JATO) and until being inactivated later in the year.

=== Strategic bombardment operations ===
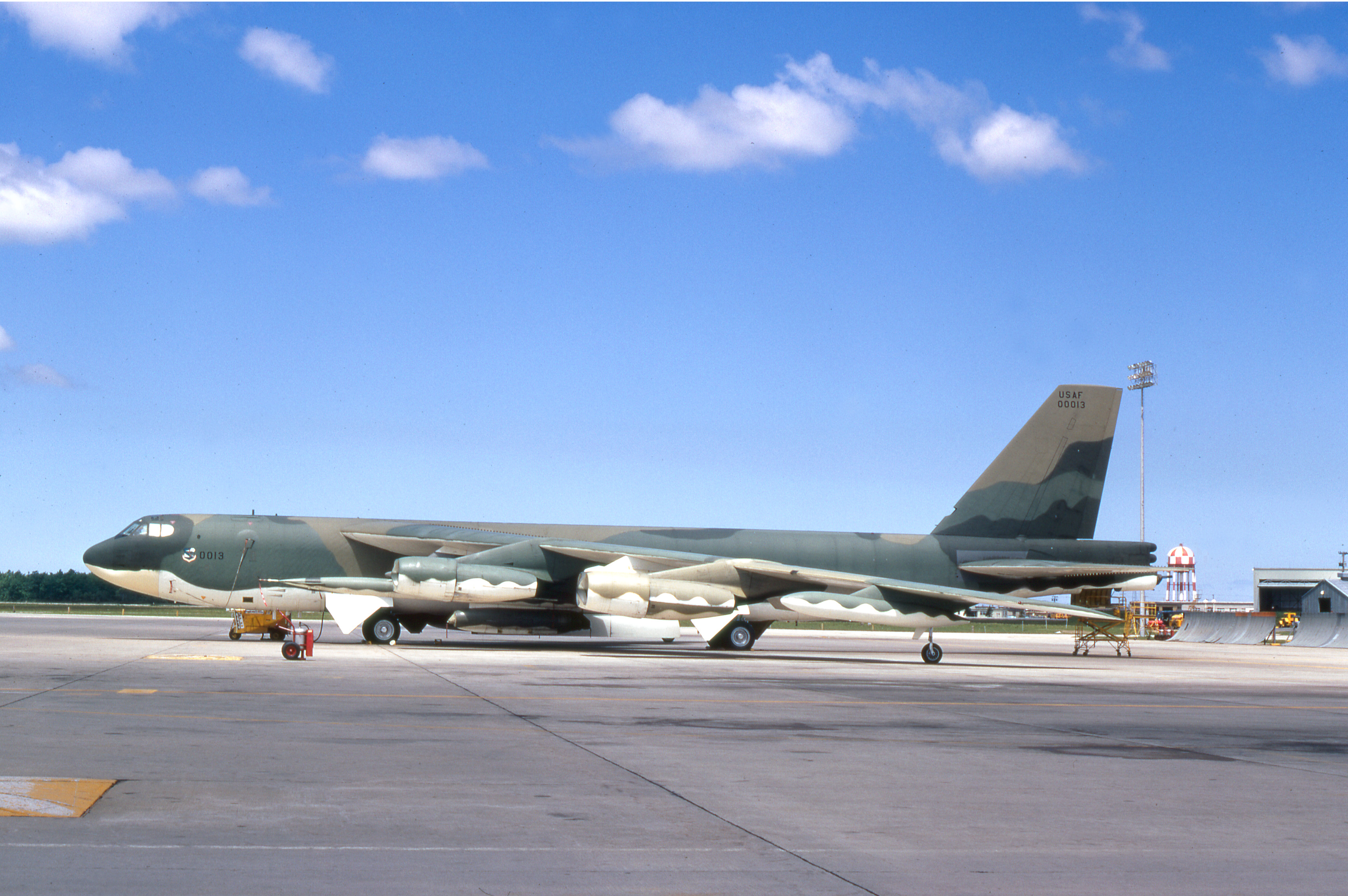
Boeing B-52H

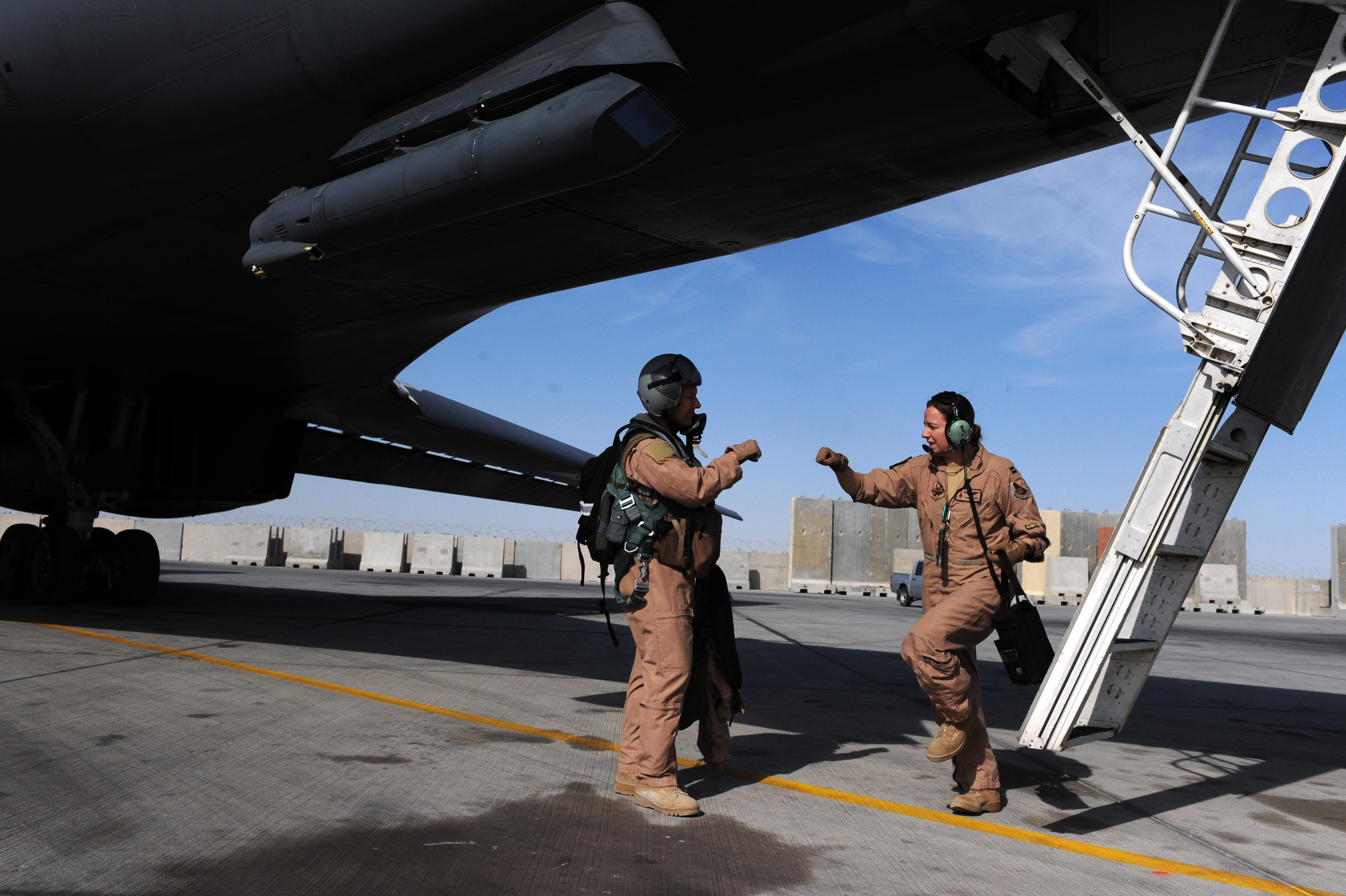
Last mission 23 January 2010

The squadron joined the 28th Bombardment Wing at Ellsworth Air Force Base, becoming the wing's second Boeing B-52H Stratofortress squadron on 1 January 1977. The squadron continued to fly the "Buff" until October 1982, when it was inactivated.

On 1 January 1987, the squadron activated and transitioned to its current aircraft, the Rockwell B-1B Lancer. Along with all other active bomber units in the air force it changed its name and became the 37th Bomb Squadron on 1 September 1991. In December 1998, it became the first unit to employ the B-1 in combat in support of Operation Desert Fox in Iraq. One year later, crews from the squadron supported Operation Allied Force and flew combat operations in Kosovo and Serbia.

Since the 9/11 attacks, the 37th and its sister squadron at Ellsworth, the 34th Bomb Squadron have joined to provide aircraft and crews to form expeditionary units. These expeditionary units have flown missions contributing to the effort to drive the Taliban from Afghanistan. During this time, the combined squadrons flew 5 percent of the strike missions but released nearly 40 percent of the total bomb tonnage—more than 1,730 tons. Its personnel have also employed the B-1 during Operation Iraqi Freedom, including a strike against high priority leadership targets in Baghdad.

In 2007, the 37th began regular deployments to the Middle East, rotating with other B-1 units, with one year at home station followed by six months deployed. On average squadron members fly over 6,000 combat hours and more than 500 combat sorties per deployment. Squadron personnel supported Libya strike missions during Operation Odyssey Dawn, the first B-1 combat mission launched from the United States to strike overseas targets.

== Lineage ==
- Organized as the 37th Aero Squadron on 13 June 1917

Demobilized on 15 April 1919

- Reconstituted and redesignated 37th Pursuit Squadron on 24 March 1923

Activated on 1 September 1933
Redesignated 37th Attack Squadron on 1 March 1935
Inactivated on 31 January 1938

- Redesignated 37th Bombardment Squadron (Medium) on 6 December 1939

Activated on 1 February 1940
Redesignated 37th Bombardment Squadron, Medium on 9 October 1944
Inactivated on 26 November 1945

- Redesignated 37th Bombardment Squadron, Light on 29 April 1947

Activated on 19 May 1947
Inactivated on 10 September 1948

- Redesignated 37th Bombardment Squadron, Light, Night Intruder on 8 May 1952

Activated on 10 May 1952
Redesignated 37th Bombardment Squadron, Tactical on 1 October 1955
Inactivated on 25 June 1958

- Redesignated 37th Bombardment Squadron, Heavy on 16 June 1977

Activated on 1 July 1977
Inactivated on 1 October 1982

- Activated on 1 January 1987

Redesignated 37th Bomb Squadron on 1 September 1991

=== Assignments ===
- Unknown, 13 June 1917
- Third Aviation Instruction Center, September 1917
- Commanding General, Services of Supply, January – 15 April 1919
- 18th Pursuit Group (attached to 8th Pursuit Group), 1 September 1933
- 2d Wing (remained attached to 8th Pursuit Group), 1 March 1935 – 31 January 1938
- 28th Composite Group, 1 February 1940
- 17th Bombardment Group, 23 April 1941 – 26 November 1945
- 17th Bombardment Group, 19 May 1947 – 10 September 1948
- 17th Bombardment Group, 10 May 1952 – 25 June 1958 (attached to 17th Bombardment Wing after 8 June 1957)
- 28th Bombardment Wing, 1 July 1977 – 1 October 1982
- 28th Bombardment Wing, 1 January 1987
- 28th Operations Group, 1 September 1991

=== Stations ===
- Camp Kelly (later Kelly Field), Texas, 13 June–11 August 1917
- Étampes, France, 18 September 1917
- Issoudun Aerodrome, France, 23 September 1917
- Bordeaux, France, c. 6 January–c. 18 March 1919
- Mitchel Field, New York, c. 5–15 April 1919
- Langley Field, Virginia, 1 September 1933 – 31 January 1938
- Barksdale Field, Louisiana, 1 February 1940
- Lowry Field, Colorado, 10 July 1940
- Pendleton Field, Oregon, 29 June 1941
- Lexington County Airport (later Columbia Army Air Base), South Carolina, 16 February 1942
- Barksdale Field, Louisiana, 24 June–18 November 1942
- Telergma Airfield, Algeria, 21 December 1942
- Sedrata Airfield, Algeria, c. 13 May 1943
- Djedeida Airfield, Tunisia, c. 25 June 1943
- Villacidro Airfield, Sardinia, Italy, c. 5 December 1943
- Poretta Airfield, Corsica, France, 21 September 1944
- Dijon Airfield (Y-9), France, 20 November 1944
- Linz Airport, Austria, c. 16 June 1945
- Horsching, Austria, (Ground echelon), 6 July 1945
- Clastres Airfield (A-71), France, c. 3 October–c. 17 November 1945
- Camp Myles Standish, Massachusetts, 25–26 November 1945
- Langley Field (later Langley Air Force Base), Virginia, 19 May 1947 – 10 September 1948
- Pusan East Air Base (K-9), South Korea, 10 May 1952
- Miho Air Base, Japan, c. 9 October 1954 – c. 19 March 1955
- Eglin Air Force Auxiliary Field No. 9 (Hurlburt Field), Florida, 1 April 1955
- RAF Alconbury, England, 11 May 1958
- Hurlburt Field, Florida, 12 May–25 June 1958
- Ellsworth Air Force Base, South Dakota, 1 July 1977 – 1 October 1982
- Ellsworth Air Force Base, South Dakota, 1 January 1987 – present

=== Aircraft ===
- Avro 504 (1918)
- Sopwith Camel (1918)
- DH-4 (1918)
- Nieuport 27 (1918)
- Curtiss P-6 Hawk (1933–1935)
- Curtiss A-8 Shrike (1935–1936)
- Northrop A-17 Nomad (1936–1938)
- Douglas B-18 Bolo (1940–1941)
- North American B-25 Mitchell (1941–1942)
- Martin B-26 Marauder (1942–1945)
- Douglas B-26 Invader (1952–1956)
- Martin B-57A Canberra (1955–1956)
- Douglas B-66B Destroyer (1956–1958)
- Boeing B-52H Stratofortress (1977–1982)
- Rockwell B-1 Lancer (1987–present)

== See also ==
- War against the Islamic State
- List of American aero squadrons
- List of B-1 units of the United States Air Force
- List of B-52 Units of the United States Air Force
- List of B-57 units of the United States Air Force
- List of Douglas A-26 Invader operators
- List of United States Air Force squadrons
- War on terror
