= 37th New Jersey Infantry Regiment =

Union Army infantry regiment in the American Civil War

- Active: June 23, 1864, to October 1, 1864
- Country: United States
- Allegiance: Union
- Branch: Infantry
- Equipment: Smoothbore muskets and Enfield rifles
- Engagements: Petersburg Campaign

The 37th New Jersey Infantry Regiment was an infantry regiment in the Union Army during the American Civil War. It was one of scores of temporary regiments that originally signed up for rear echelon duty as Hundred Days Men in an effort to free up veteran troops for front-line combat.

== Service ==
The 37th New Jersey Infantry Regiment was organized at Camp Delaware in Trenton, New Jersey, and mustered into service on June 23, 1864, for a term of one hundred days. The regiment was commanded by a veteran of the Army of the Potomac, Col. E. Burd Grubb. The ranks contained more than 700 men, many of whom had previous military experience. Before leaving camp on June 28, the new soldiers were issued one hundred smoothbore muskets altered to percussion caps and five-hundred and thirty-eight Enfield rifles.

Once the 37th New Jersey arrived in City Point, Virginia, they were put to work at depots near the Appomattox River unloading supply trains, relieving the veterans who had been doing this routine work. The 37th was assigned to the X Corps of the Army of the James, serving under Maj. Gen. David B. Birney.

On August 27, with more manpower needed in the front-lines, the regiment was ordered to man the trenches in front of Petersburg, and the next day, they arrived to support the Hare House Battery. During the Siege of Petersburg, the 37th suffered 34 men killed and wounded. On September 26, they were relieved by another regiment and transported back to Trenton.

The 37th New Jersey was mustered out of the army on October 1, 1864.

== Regimental statistics ==
Killed or died of wounds
2 Officers
6 Enlisted men

Wounded and recovered
0 Officers
29 Enlisted men

Died of disease or accidents

2 Officers
Colonel Grubb's younger brother Parker Grubb, the regimental adjutant
Lt. Col. John S. Barlow, died 9/12/1864

13 Enlisted men

== Battle deaths ==
Private Theodore H. Gardner of Company G, killed at Petersburg on September 5, 1864
Private Joseph Bryer of Company D, killed at Petersburg on September 15, 1864
Corporal George Garwine of Company D, wounded at Petersburg on September 15, 1864, died of wounds on September 25, 1864
Private Alexander Carpenter of Company I, killed at Petersburg on September 20, 1864
Private Philip Williamson of Company E, killed at Petersburg on September 24, 1864
Private William Morehouse of Company B, killed at Petersburg on September 25, 1864

== See also ==
- List of New Jersey Civil War Units
