= 37th Brigade =

37th Brigade or 37th Infantry Brigade may refer to:

== Belarus ==
- 37th Guards Separate Mechanized Brigade

== Germany ==
- 37th Panzergrenadier Brigade (Bundeswehr)

== India ==
- 37th Indian Brigade of the British Indian Army in the First World War
- 37th Indian Infantry Brigade of the British Indian Army in the Second World War

== Russia ==
- 37th Separate Airborne Brigade of the Soviet/Russian Airborne Troops
- 37th Separate Guards Motor Rifle Brigade of the Russian Armed Forces

== Ukraine ==
- 37th Marine Brigade (Ukraine)
- 37th Public Order Brigade (Ukraine)

== United Kingdom ==
- 37th Anti-Aircraft Brigade (United Kingdom)
- 37th Brigade (United Kingdom)
- 37th (Howitzer) Brigade Royal Field Artillery

== United States ==
- 37th Infantry Brigade Combat Team (United States)

== See also ==
- 37th Division (disambiguation)
- 37th Regiment (disambiguation)
- 37th Squadron (disambiguation)
