= 37th Battalion =

37th Battalion may refer to:

- 37th Battalion (Australia)
- 37th Battalion (New Zealand)
- 37th Battalion (Northern Ontario), CEF
