= Feiler =

Feiler is a surname. Notable people with the surname include:

- Bruce Feiler (born 1964), American author
- Dror Feiler (born 1951), Israeli-born Swedish musician
- Gunilla Sköld-Feiler (born 1953), Swedish artist
- Hertha Feiler (1916–1970), Austrian actress
- Jo Feiler (born 1951), American artist
- Manfred Feiler (1925–2020), German artist
- Matt Feiler (born 1992), American football player
- Paul Feiler (1918–2013), German-born British artist
- Uwe Feiler (born 1965), German politician

== See also ==
- Feiler Faster Thesis
