= Council of Dads =

Council of Dads may refer to:

- The Council of Dads (book), 2010 book by Bruce Feiler
- Council of Dads (TV pilot), a 2011 TV series pilot based on the book and developed by Peter Tolan for Fox
- Council of Dads (TV series), a 2020 TV series based on the book on NBC
