= 24-hour news cycle =

Investigation and reporting of news, concomitant with fast-paced lifestyles

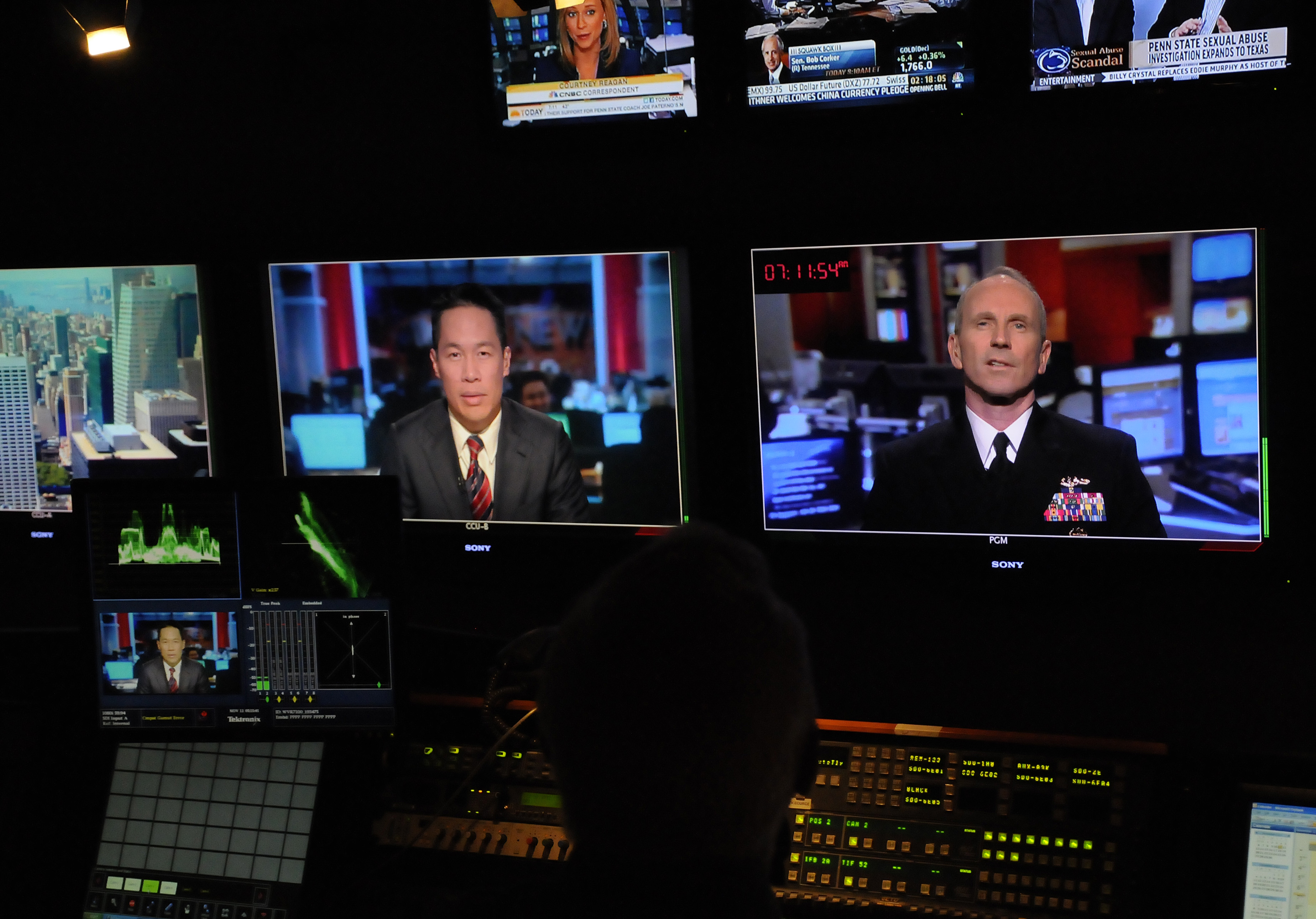
Several simultaneous NBC News broadcasts (including MSNBC, NBC's Today and CNBC's Squawk Box) displayed on monitors

The 24-hour news cycle (or 24/7 news cycle) is the 24-hour investigation and reporting of news or informational content, typically by for-profit media agencies engaged in mass communications, but encompassing both traditional and non-traditional forms of reporting. The proliferation of mass media and the growth of the cable television market in recent decades has increased competition for audience and advertiser attention, prompting agencies to seek to deliver the latest news in the most compelling manner possible in order to remain ahead of competitors. The television, radio, print, online and mobile app news media industries have many suppliers, all of whom seek to maintain relevancy, principally by delivering the news first.

Beginning with the invention of the telegraph in the mid 19th-century, societal expectations for news availability expanded rapidly. The acceptable length of time after which reporting was expected to be made available on a newsworthy event contracted considerably as the travel time for official correspondences across borders shrunk from days or weeks to minutes. Although all-news radio stations had operated for decades prior, 24-hour news culture truly arrived in the 1980s with the advent of cable television channels dedicated exclusively to round-the-clock news coverage. This shift brought about a much faster pace of news production, and an increased demand for continuous reporting with real-time updates. This reporting structure stood in marked contrast to the slower pacing of the news cycle seen previously in printed dailies. The high premium on immediate coverage would further increase with the advent of online news.

A complete news cycle consists of the media reporting on an event, followed by it reporting on public and organizational reactions to previous reports. The advent of 24-hour cable and satellite television news channels and, in more recent times, of news sources on the World Wide Web (including blogs), has considerably shortened the timeframe within which this process occurs.

== History ==
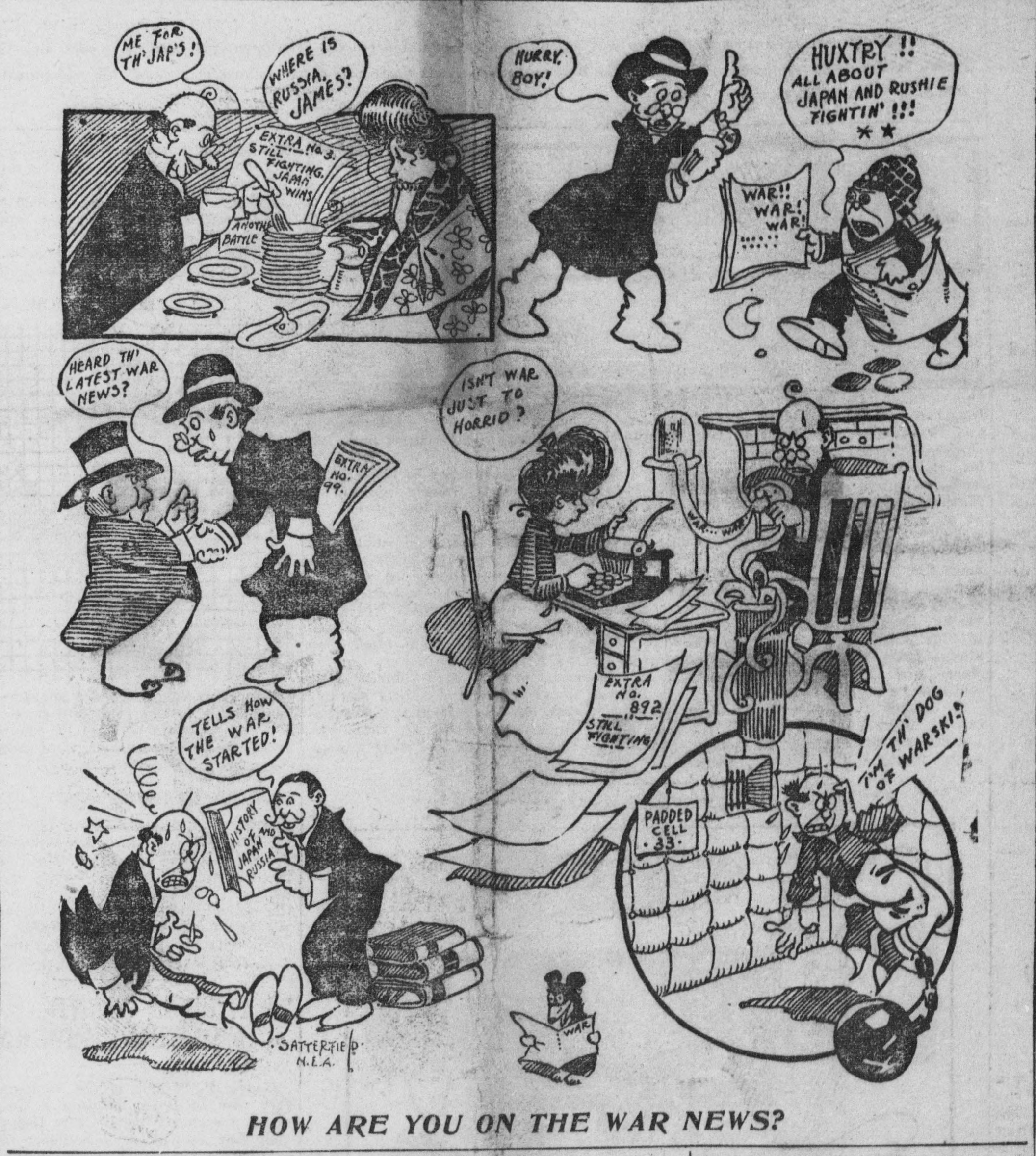
1904 political cartoon by Bob Satterfield satirizing the glut of news on the Russo-Japanese War.

=== Cultural origins ===
The 24-hour news cycle ultimately traces its origins to the technological transformations witnessed amid the Industrial Revolution in the mid-19th century: the development of telegraphic communication systems in 1858—along with improved freight and passenger transport by means of steam and rail travel—allowed rapid communication and travel across long distances and into once deeply isolated communities. These advancements created some of the earliest shifts in norms surrounding communication, information, and the speed at which the latter was expected and able to be made available to the general viewing public. From then on, consumer expectations for the availability of press coverage would be markedly increased across the industrialized world.

Starting with the invention of the paper machine by the Didot family in 1799, new techniques developed over the course of the 19th century exponentially reduced the cost of, and exponentially enhanced the speed at which paper and printed materials could be produced. Early advances drove the development of a new information economy, creating a market for books and other press materials directed toward a general audience, which massively reduced barriers to entry for printers, publishers, and readers (via improved access to resources for the attainment of literacy), allowing demand to increase with supply, and vice versa.

Evidently, norm shifts occurred almost instantaneous to the developments that allowed for them. Supposedly, the second message ever transmitted by telegraph (sent by Samuel Morse from Washington to Baltimore in 1844)–immediately following the first, "what hath God wrought?"–was "have you any news?". Following the shooting of President James Garfield in 1881, public fervor erupted at newsrooms across the United States. Mass bulletins were established in some localities to satisfy demand, offering what might be considered one of the earliest examples of a modern media frenzy. In the years that followed, the urgency with which news was received and sought after increased proportionately to improvements in the speed and quality of communications systems.

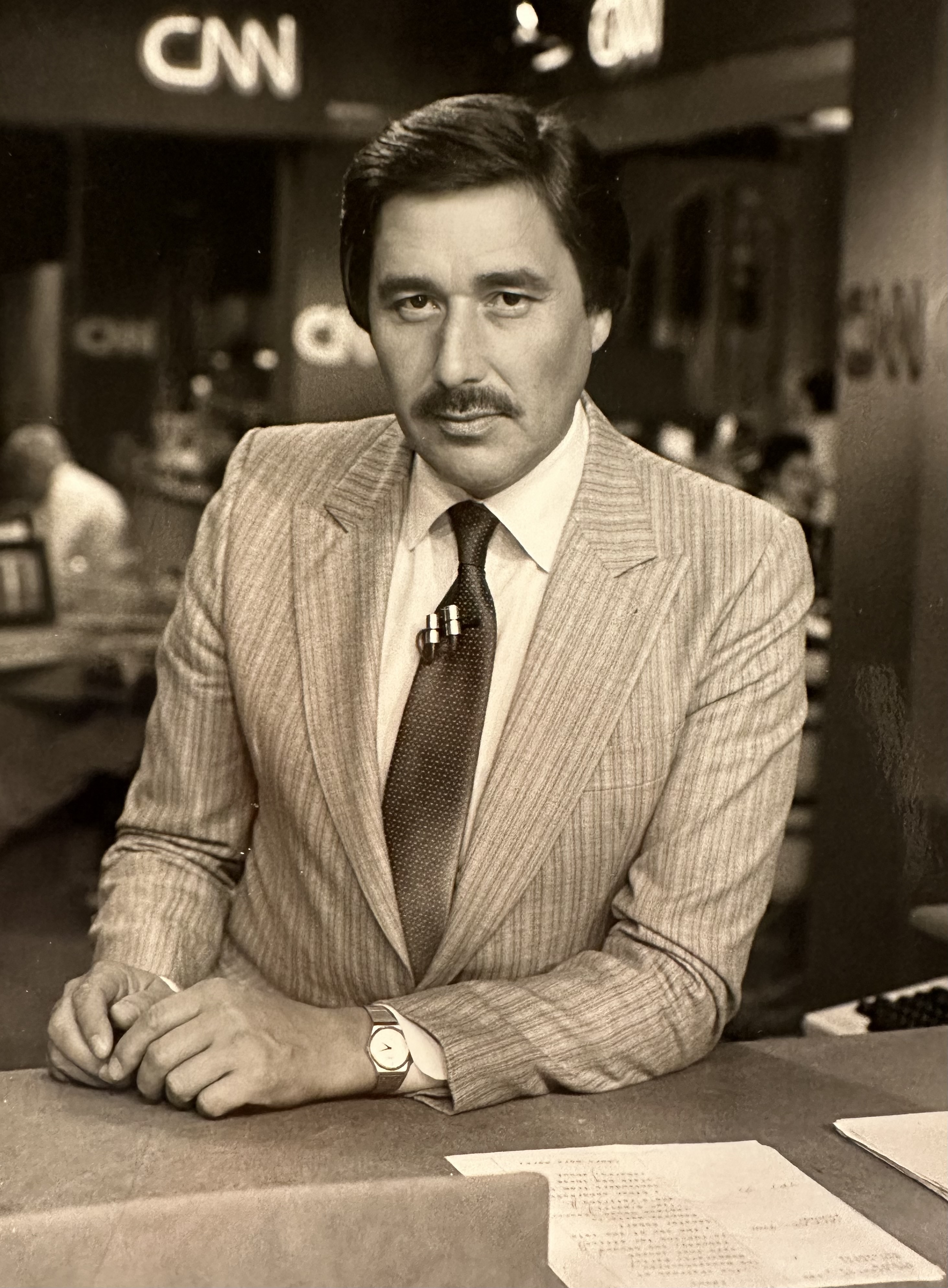
1985 photograph of Don Miller, one of the original anchors of CNN.

=== CNN and the advent of cable television ===
Ted Turner and Reese Schonfeld pioneered the concept of 24-hour network news with their founding of Cable News Network (CNN) in 1979. Though encouraged by his estimation that the network would prove lucrative (on account of the newfound ease with which audiences could access live coverage of major world events "from the comfort...of their own homes"), Turner appeared driven at least in part by the notion that a news culture of the sort he envisioned might "promote global understanding and foster peace". First airing in 1980, the network struggled initially, and was widely viewed within the industry as a hopeless enterprise; by the end of the decade, though, it had stabilized, and eventually became a model for other networks as cable television proliferated, competition for viewership among a larger cohort of networks increased, and shifting strategies to sustain viewership substantively and qualitatively changed the nature of media.

Beginning in 1982, following the example set by CNN, C-SPAN extended its broadcast schedule from 8 to 16, then ultimately 24-hour daily coverage; the network states that this extension "enabl[ed] it to add a wider variety of public affairs programming to [sic.] viewers while maintaining its commitment to carry the proceedings of the U.S. House". CNN's success led to the proliferation of round-the-clock cable news stations beginning in the late 1980s, seeking to compete with CNNs model. Among the most successful of these were Fox News, established in 1986, and MSNBC, formed a decade later as a joint venture between NBCUniversal and Microsoft.

In 2015, Time magazine noted that the 1995 O. J. Simpson murder case was a significant early example of 24-hour press coverage.

Manu Raju reporting from the nosebleeds at the 2016 Democratic National Convention

=== The rise of online media ===
The public launch of the World Wide Web in 1993, and subsequent widespread adoption of various Internet tools and services by the public in the late 1990s catalyzed what was an already near-instantaneous news consumption culture. News content became vastly more accessible across a far greater range with the rise of the open internet, yet the explosion in the depth and diversity of the informational ecosystem broadly prompted outlets to operate under lower journalistic standards to maintain relevancy in an increasingly niche and fractious media environment. The mass interweaving of global communications channels, alongside the proliferation of online forums and open source digital resources virtually erased barriers to entry for citizen journalism, accelerating both demand for and production of reporting on real-time events worldwide.

The culture of citizen journalism that arose with the launch of early social media platforms, and the condensed attention economy which developed in their wake broadly led to expectations among audiences that some measure of reporting on a newsworthy event be made available almost simultaneous to its occurrence.

== Critical assessment ==
It would be reasonable to assume that the competition spurred by the expansion and diversification of media would result in a greater diversity of viewpoints reflected and reporting strategies employed by networks to attract audiences, thus driving improved journalism and journalistic standards; however, the advent of cable television instead drove the hyper-personalization of news feeds and the outlets that supplied them, as the industry increasingly lost market share to other forms of media, and thus pursued more extreme strategies to attract the attention of audiences and readers.

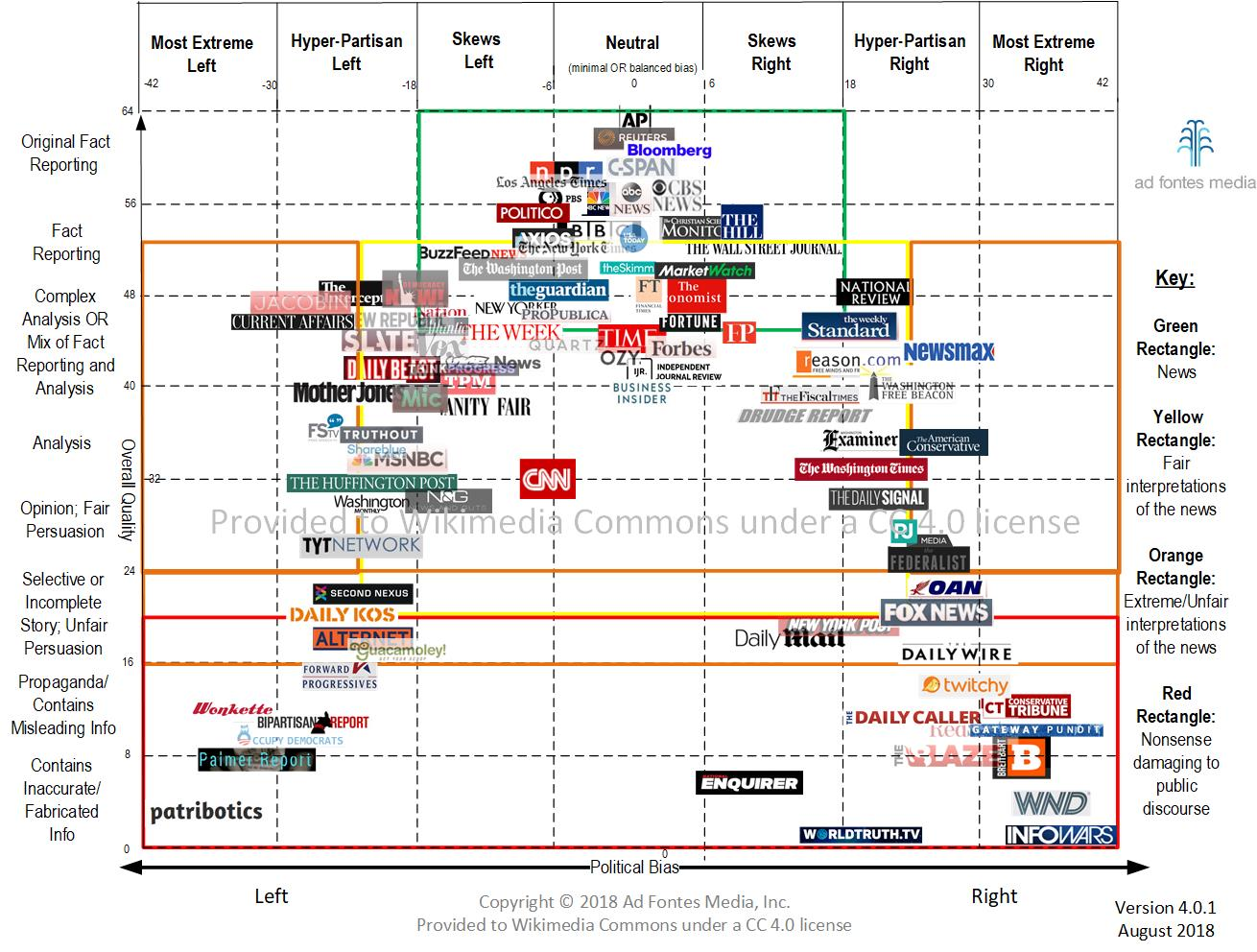
A political alignment chart of major 21st century English-language news media platforms and publications

The same forces that helped to propel forward a 24-hour news culture in the 21st century are thought to have massively transformed the global cultural landscape and the determinant factors for its evolution in digitally equipped societies. This was first suggested by Canadian philosopher Marshall McLuhan, who coined the term "global village" in the early 1960s to describe his theory of a rapid evolution in societal norms and values as consequence of the equally rapid shifts and advancements in the communications systems being developed and employed amidst the Cold War. He contended that "electronic technology would decentralize power and information, allowing people to live in smaller clusters far from major urban centers while having the same access to information...break[ing] the tyranny of print culture -- with its emphasis on rational, linear thinking...restor[ing] a richer, sensory balance".

Though many of McLuhan's ideas were considered to be underdeveloped or over interpretive in the following decades, with the persistence of a fixed print, radio, and television media ecosystem, the broad strokes of his philosophy are widely considered in the 21st century to have been predictive of the cultural transformations that would emerge with the advent of the modern Internet. Previous tastemakers no longer achieved the viewership necessary to broadly determine and/or enforce societal norms, and the weight and credibility granted to major media networks diminished greatly with the entrance of a diverse range of news and culture platforms catered to the hyper-individualized interests of viewers who had, up to that point, largely been a captive audience. Turner himself had asserted the inherent biases of traditional network media in a 1984 congressional committee hearing, contending that the "[Big Three] networks remain insensitive to the public interest and [other] social interests in their uncontrollable desire for ratings and revenue", though ultimately feeling it best remedied by increased competition through expansion of the marketplace.

Acting Secretary of the Navy Hung Cao (center) seated with the hosts of Fox News at the 2026 Great American State Fair in Washington, D.C.

=== Sensationalism and infotainment ===
Many scholars have argued that the presentational style of 24-hour news verges on or explicitly operates as infotainment. According to former journalists Bill Kovach and Tom Rosenstiel, 24-hour news creates wild competition among media organizations for audience share. This, coupled with the profit demand of their corporate ownership, has led to a decline in journalistic standards. They state in their book Warp Speed: America in the Age of Mixed Media that "the press has moved toward sensationalism, entertainment, and opinion" and away from traditional values of verification, proportion, relevance, depth, and quality of interpretation. They feared these values would be replaced by a "journalism of assertion" which de-emphasizes whether a claim is valid in favor of placing it into the arena of public discussion as quickly as possible.

Some researchers believe that the proliferation of individualized news programming in the United States helped to fuel the creation of a hyper-partisan media environment inclined towards antagonism of the ideological opponents of a network's viewership, who ultimately adopt a more extreme interpretation of the values those networks promote, driving the process forward in a reinforcing feedback loop.

== Psychological and societal effects ==
The psychological effect of constant and overbearing exposure to news on regional global events is pronounced. A Civil War era account by Oliver Wendell Holmes Sr., detailing the "war fever" afflicting men of the time, serves as one of the earliest observations on the psychological effects of relatively instantaneous communication. Holmes spoke of a "nervous restlessness" within which "men [could] not think, or [sic.] write, or attend to their ordinary business".

In the modern era, overexposure to media has been shown to exacerbate the negative effects of pre-existing mental health conditions, notwithstanding "significant associations between media consumption and post-traumatic stress disorder, post-traumatic stress, stress reactions, anger, dreams, alcohol drinking, negative emotions, and complicated grief above and beyond other sources", particularly as pertains to coverage of war, disasters, terror attacks, and other tragic / mass casualty events. Psychological effects on the subjects of media exposure are equally pronounced. As early as 1982, with the introduction of round-the-clock coverage on C-SPAN, Washington Post reporter Kathryn Buxton noted that "the influence of the camera's eye" [on members of the House] was evident".

== See also ==
- CNN effect
- Feiler faster thesis
- Information overload
- Information pollution
- Infotainment

== Works cited ==
- Brownell, Katheryn (2023). "Shifting Television News Values in Cable America". Political Rhetoric and the Media: The Year in C-SPAN Research. 8 1. 1-16 – via JSTOR.
- Mass Communication, Media, and Culture - An Introduction to Mass Communication. University of Minnesota Libraries. 2016. ISBN 9781946135261.
- Bowman, Shayne; Willis, Chris (2003). "WeMedia: How audiences are shaping the future of news and information" (PDF). The Media Center at the American Press Institute.
