= Rosemary Daniell =

American poet and writer (born 1935)

- Born: Rosemary Hughes; November 29, 1935 (age 90); Atlanta, Georgia, U.S.
- Occupations: Poet, author, teacher
- Writing career
- Language: English
- Period: 1975–present
- Genres: Poetry, non-fiction, fiction
- Notable works: A Sexual Tour of the Deep South, Fatal Flowers, Sleeping with Soldiers

Rosemary Daniell (born November 29, 1935) is an American second-wave feminist poet and author. She is known for her poetry collection, "A Sexual Tour of the Deep South," that focused on anger and sexuality, as well as her memoirs "Fatal Flowers: On Sin, Sex, and Suicide in the Deep South" and "Sleeping with Soldiers: In Search of the Macho Man."

== Early life and education ==
Rosemary Daniell was born Rosemary Hughes in Atlanta, Georgia, on November 29, 1935. Following her family's move to Tucker, Georgia, when she was 16 years old, Daniell dropped out of Tucker High School to marry her first husband, Laurens Ramos.

== Career ==
Daniell has authored ten books of poetry, creative nonfiction, and fiction; appeared on various national television and radio shows; and lectured at numerous literary venues. In 1981, Daniell founded a series of creative writing workshops for women in Savannah, Georgia. Speaking of her importance in the Savannah literary scene, New York Times bestselling author Bruce Feiler wrote: "Rosemary Daniell belongs in the Mount Rushmore of Savannah literary figures. And by that, I mean, Flannery O’Connor, Conrad Aiken, Johnny Mercer," said Feiler, ticking off a list of marquee names to which she will belong one day. "She is right up there in the Top 10 literary figures that have ever come out of Savannah."

=== Formative experiences and early career ===
In 1975, Daniell's mother died by suicide and her father died of cancer. That same year, she published her first book of poetry, A Sexual Tour of the Deep South. The book stirred controversy in the Bible Belt but was hailed by Rolling Stone magazine as one of the best works of feminist literature of the era. Her second poetry collection The Feathered Trees, published the following year, focused mostly on nature, while her third poetry collection Fort Bragg & Other Points South (1988) saw her return to writing about women's sexual experiences.

Her first memoir, Fatal Flowers: On Sin, Sex, and Suicide in the Deep South (1980), was partially inspired by her mother's unrealised talents as a writer and her subsequent suicide.

Daniell's second memoir, Sleeping with Soldiers (1985), draws from her experience as one of the first women to work on an oil rig. She describes the men she's attracted to as "macho men": physically strong and courageous risk-takers "who communicate viscerally and emotionally rather than intellectually."

Daniell's contributions to second-wave feminism are profiled in the book Feminists Who Changed America,1963–1975 by Barbara J. Love, editor and foreword by Nancy F. Cott.

Daniell's first book about her workshops, The Woman Who Spilled Words All Over Herself: Writing and the Zona Rosa Way, was published by Faber and Faber in 1997; her second book about the writing workshops, Secrets of the Zona Rosa: How Writing (and Sisterhood) Can Change Women's Lives, was published by Henry Holt in 2006.

Daniell was awarded the Governor's Award in the Humanities in 2008 for her contributions to Georgia's literary heritage.

== Teaching and the Zona Rosa writing group ==
In the 1970s, Daniell became involved in activities that encouraged the appreciation of writers and writing. During 1971–72, she served as Director of Poetry in the Schools, a joint program of the National Endowment for the Arts and the Georgia State Council for the Arts, a national program that allowed students to work with published poets. During that time, she initiated and led a number of writing workshops in various locations, including the Georgia Correctional Institute for Women, and the Wyoming Women's Centre in Lusk, Wyoming.

In 1981, Daniell founded a creative writing workshop for women in Savannah. Two years later she named the workshop Zona Rosa. She led groups all over the country and in France, Italy and Ireland, and to date, over 300 Zona Rosans have become published authors.The workshops, which she still teaches, have been a critical part of her writing career. This series of life-changing workshops have been People and Southern Living and have been attended by thousands of women, and some men, including Pat Conroy, a frequent visitor, and John Berendt would drop by for feedback on the latest chapter of what became Midnight in the Garden of Good and Evil, his record-breaking bestseller about a notorious murder. Daniell's book Secrets of the Zona Rosa: How Writing (and Sisterhood) Can Change Women's Lives, was published by Henry Holt and Company in 2006.

== Publications ==
=== Poetry ===
- A Sexual Tour of the Deep South (Push Button Publishing, 1994; Holt, Rinehart and Winston, 1975).
- The Feathered Trees (a chapbook; Sweetwater Press; 1976).
- Fort Bragg & Other Points South (Henry Holt and Company, 1988).
- The Murderous Sky: Poems of Madness & Mercy, (Lavender Ink Press, 2021).

=== Nonfiction ===
- Fatal Flowers: On Sin, Sex & Suicide in the Deep South (memoir; Hill Street Press, 1999; Henry Holt and Company, 1989; Avon Books, 1981; Holt, Rinehart, and Winston, 1980).
- Sleeping with Soldiers (memoir; Hill Street Press, Warner Books, 1986; Granada, England, 1986; Edizioni Frassinelli, Italy, 1986; Holt, Rinehart and Winston, 1985). It was also a part of the Book of the Month Club Collection of Erotic Classics.
- The Woman Who Spilled Words All Over Herself: Writing & Living the Zona Rosa Way, (Faber & Faber, 1997; paper, 1998).
- Confessions of a (Female) Chauvinist (essays; Hill Street Press, 2001).
- Secrets of the Zona Rosa: How Writing (and Sisterhood) Can Change Women's Lives, (Henry Holt and Company, 2006).

=== Fiction ===
- The Hurricane Season, (William Morrow & Company, 1992).

=== Literary and small press – Poetry ===
- The Atlantic Monthly: "Bridal Luncheon;" Volume 214, No. 2; August 1964.
- Poetry Northwest: "Black Animals," "Green Frogs," and "Ducks;" Volume V, Number 5; Spring, 1964.
- Shenandoah: The Washington and Lee University Review:" "The Mountain Was My Father;" Summer, 1965.
- Poem: "The Feathered Trees," "The Birthday," "In the Waiting Room of a Mental Hospital," and "The Wild Birds;" No. 3-4, November 1968. "The Brown Slopes of Innocence," No. 1, November 1967.
- The Virginia Quarterly Review: "The Creek;" Volume 43, Number l; Winter, 1967.
- The Great Speckled Bird: "The Doll;" October 11, 1970. Also, "The Distant War" and "How to Make Your Own Napalm;" May 5, 1969. Also, "A French Kiss for Inez Garcia."
- South and West: "Garden Club Meeting;" Volume 9, No. l; Summer, 1970. "Coffee Break" and "Tea Party;" Volume 7, No. 4; Spring, 1969.
- TriQuarterly: "Tiger Lilies;" Number Fifteen; Spring, 1969.
- Descant: "Roman Forms in America" and "The Swimmer;" Volume Thirteen, Number Four; Summer, 1969.
- The Literary Review: "Facing Eros" and "Jack and I in Georgia: 1945;" Summer, 1969.
- The Dekalb Literary Arts Journal: "April in Georgia, 1971;"1972. "Georgia Road" and "The Quickening;" Volume 1, Number l; Fall, 1966.
- Archon: Literary Art Magazine of Emory University:" "Tulips;" Spring, 1971.
- The New Orleans Review: "A Week in February," "Shiksa," and "Declaration Day;" Volume 4, No. 4, 1975. "The State of Georgia" and "Talking of Stars;" Volume 4, No. 3; 1974. "The Angel Stud." Volume 3, No. 2; 1973. "Over Chattanooga," Volume 3, No. 4; 1973. "The Bible Salesman;" Volume 3, No. 1; 1972.
- The New York Quarterly: "I Want;" Number 16, 1974. "What's Happening;" Number 13, Winter, 1973.
- The Drunken Boat: "Oh, Men!" Number 1, 1973.
- The Georgia State University Review, 1977–78: "Blood Brother."
- Negative Capability: "Valentine's Day, 1982;" Volume VII, Numbers I & II, 1987. "Sewing;" Volume II, Number IV, Fall, 1982.
- Paintbrush: "The Color of Halcyon Days" and "Yellow Birds;" Volume X, Nos. 19 & 20, Spring & Autumn, 1983.
- The Chattahoochee Review: "The Power of Love" and "Accommodations;" Volume XVII – Number 3, Spring, 1997. "Sex in Savannah" and "A Lisp for Myth Amerika;" Volume V – Number 4, Summer, 1985. "A Pile of Chopped Pine Logs" and "Of Money and Class, and the Plight of the Working Man;" Volume V – Number 3, Spring, 1985.
- The American Voice: "Values, or the Christ of the White Shag Carpet," No. 40, Summer, 1996; "Chocolate Eclairs," No. 33, Summer, 1994; "Fort Bragg," No. 5, Winter, 1986. "Loss of the Soul & Other Sicknesses;" No. 3, Summer, 1986.
- Arrival: "Craving Hollywood;" Summer, 1987.
- Explicit Lyrics: "Portrait: Boy with Dog;" Number One, 1999.
- Caprice: "The Cowgirl Tells Her Daughter about Life," "The Elephant Maiden," Fall, 1996; "The Chef;" March 1990.
- Kalliope: "Southern Suttee, or What Grandmother Knew," Winter, 2001; "Death of the Drum Fish," "Intimate Terrorists" (nominated for Pushcart Prize); Fall, 1996.
- Arts & Letters: "What Keith the Hunter Says About the Deer in the Hills" and "For Jesus, Eyes Blazing;" Spring, 2002.
- Web Del Sol, an online chapbook of selected poems, 2002
- The Copenhagen Review: "Rooms, or the Comfort of Enclosed Spaces," "One-Eyed Jack," "Miracles Are Like That;" No. Three, 2008.
- The Double Dealer: "Sacred Things," 2009.
- Minerva Rising: "When I Had Balls for a Day," 2016.

=== Literary and small press – prose ===
- Teachers & Writers Collaborative: "My High School English Teacher," January–February, 1986.
- Helicon Nine: "A Piece of White Satin" (short story); Number 17/18, 1987.
- Habersham Review: "Of Cudden Lily Rising" (short story); Volume I, Number 2; Spring, 1992.

=== Literary and small press publications – other ===
- Editor: Dracula and Other Poems, An Anthology of Poems by Students in Georgia Schools. Also: Joy to the Word!, a pamphlet describing her experiences as poet in residence in Georgia schools; printed by the Georgia Council for the Arts; 1973.
- Paintbrush: Interview with Rosemary Daniell; Volume III, Number 5; Spring 1976.
- Negative Capability: Interview with Rosemary Daniell, Volume III, Number IV; Fall 1983.
- Habersham Review: Interview with Rosemary Daniell, Volume I, Number 2; Spring, 1992.
- Kalliope: Interview with Rosemary Daniell; Fall, Number 3, 1996.
- The Chattahoochee Review: Interview with Rosemary Daniell; Volume XVII – Number 3, Spring, 1997.

=== Anthologies ===
- We Become New: Poems by Contemporary American Women: "Girl Friends," "Before the Fall," "To a Family Man in His Family Room," and "I Want"(poems); Bantam Press, 1976.
- Sojourner: "Girl Friends" (a poem); Interart Center, New York City; 1976.
- Cafe at Saint Marks: The Apalachee Poets: "Liturgy" (a poem); The Apalachee Poetry Center, Tallahassee, Florida; 1976.
- White Trash: "The Operation" and "A Week in February" (poems); The New South Company, 1976.
- The Callanwolde Poets: "The Brown Slopes of Innocence" The Tinhorn Press; 1976.
- Southern Poetry: The Seventies: "Of Jayne Mansfield, Flannery O'Connor, My Mother & Me;" University of North Carolina Press, 1977.
- Finished Product: An Anthology of Atlanta Poets: "Of Jayne Mansfield, Flannery O'Connor, My Mother & Me;" The Poetry Factory, 1978.
- Contemporary Southern Poetry: "Of Jayne Mansfield, Flannery O'Connor, My Mother & Me" (a poem); University of Louisiana Press, 1980.
- Woman Poet: The South: "A Kiss for Inez Garcia" (a poem); Women-in-Literature, Inc., 1989.
- Lips Unsealed: Confidences from Contemporary Women Writers: "Stains on a Piece of White Satin" (fiction) and "In Search of the Macho Man" (memoir); Capra Press, 1990.
- Touching Fire: A Collection of Erotic Writing by Women: "Talking of Stars" (a poem); Crossing Press, 1990.
- Georgia Voices: Fiction Edited by Hugh Ruppersburge; University of Georgia Press, 1992.
- The Time of Our Lives: "Sleeping With Soldiers" (an excerpt); The Crossing Press, 1993.
- Literary Savannah, edited by Patrick Allen and published by Hill Street Press, 1998.
- Georgia Voices: Poetry Edited by Hugh Ruppersburge; University of Georgia Press, 2000.
- How I Learned to Cook: Edited by Margot Perin; Jeremy P. Tarcher, 2004.
- Stirring Up a Storm; Edited by Marilyn Jaye Lewis; Thunder's Mouth Press, 2005.
- Desire: Women Write About Wanting; Edited by Lisa Solod Warren. Seal, Press, 2007.
- Sugar in My Bowl: Real Women Write About Real Sex; Edited by Erica Jong. Ecco/ HarperCollins, 2011.

=== Trade/other publications ===
- Atlanta Gazette: Mesas to Magnolias: A Southern Woman in the West;" August 1977.
- Playgirl: "In Search of the Macho Man," December 1982.
- Harper's Bazaar: "The Lure of the Hard Hat," November 1984.
- Mademoiselle: "Sinfully Sexy: 14 Red-Hot Men," March 1986.
- Atlanta Journal-Constitution: "A Family Christmas in the West," December 25, 1986. "Growing up Southern: Of Dirt and Flowers of All Kinds;" July 22, 1984.
- Us: "She's in the Army Now," January 1987. "Down South: The Jim Williams Murder Trials," May 1986. "Suicide in Coral Springs: The Tina Mancini Story," June 1987.
- "The Drinking Season," January 1987; "The Southern Body," October 1986.
- Mother Jones: "Cora Lee Johnson: Heroes for Hard Times," January 1988. Excerpt, Sleeping With Soldiers; January 1985. "Secrets, Shackles and Shame: The Ginny Foat Trial:" July 1984. "Southern Discomfort: Slipping Down the Economic Slopes in Savannah;" November 1984.
- Southern: "Blood, Heat, Mayhem: A Memoir;" September 1988.
- Self: "The Right Guy;" September 1988."
- Diversion: "City Diary, Savannah;" October 1988. "Mexico's Spicy Colonial Trail," October 1989.
- Physicians Lifestyle: "An Insider's Guide to Savannah," April 1990.
- Geo (German Edition): "Blood, Heat, Mayhem: a Memoir;" December 1991.
- Changes: "In the Heart of the Heart of Darkness: When Suicide Runs in the Family;" April 1992. "Codependency: When Loves Goes Haywire;" February 1992.
- The Chicago Tribune: "The Tailhook Incident;" September 1992.
- Golden Isles Magazine: The Hurricane Season (an excerpt); October 1992.
- Travel and Leisure: "Savannah: City of Secrets and Seduction;" April 1993.
- Men's Fitness: "Why I Like Tough Guys (the Real Kind);" 1996.
- Southern Living: "Georgia, My State of Everything;" 1998.
- Atlanta: "Before and After: The Pill and Me," June 2000; "The Gifts the Poet Gave Me (a memoir of James Dickey)," January 1998; "Bad Girls & Artists: The Price Southern Women Pay for Breaking the Rules," October 1997. "In Search of the New Southern Belle," January 1985."Living the Fairy Tale by the Sea," July 1984. "Travel Reachable Beaches," June 1984; "Women's Liberation: The Feminine Frustration," June 1970. Also, "Culture: The Georgia Arts Council;" "James Dickey: A Strong, Clean Wind;" Human Dynamics: Enhancing the Inner Man; "The Yerkes Primate Center: Vanguard in the Human Jungle;" 1966–76.
- Atlanta Woman: "The Only Risk in Life Is Not Taking One;" premiere issue, 2002.

=== Book reviews ===
- New York Native: Women Folks: Growing up Down South, by Shirley Abbott; May 20, 1984.
- Atlanta: Beyond Power: On Women, Men, Morals, by Marilyn French; January 1986. An Indian Attachment, by Sarah Lloyd; April 1985.
- The Atlanta Journal-Constitution: Shooting Rats at the Bibb County Dump (poems) by David Bottoms; June 8, 1980. Meditations in an Emergency (poems) by Frank O'Hara. Also, over twenty reviews of other books of contemporary poetry by such poets as Diane Wakoski, Erica Jong, and Robert Duncan; 1966–72.
- The Philadelphia Inquirer: Collected Stories by Carson McCullers; September 20, 1987. The Myth of Women's Masochism by Paula Caplan, November 3, 1985.
- New York Woman: Self-Consciousness by John Updike, This Boy's Life by Tobias Wolff: April 1989. Wordstruck by Robert MacNeil. Loving Rachel by Jane Bernsteln; November, 1988. Grown Up Fast: A True Story of Teenage Life in Suburban American by Betsy Israel; September, 1988.
- Newsday: Any Woman's Blues by Erica Jong; January 21, 1990.
- New York Times Book Review: "Rootie Kazootie" by Lawrence Naumoff; March 11, 1990. Heart of the Country by Fay Weldon; December 11, 1988. Zami: A New Spelling of My Name and Chosen Poems Old and New by Audre Lorde; December 19, 1982. Miss Undine's Living Room by James Wilcox; October 18, 1988. Among Birches by Rebecca Hill, April 27, 1986.
- Los Angeles Times Book Review: Southern Daughter: The Life of Margaret Mitchell by Darden Asbury Pyron; September 1992.

=== Grants and awards ===
- Harcourt, Brace & World Fellowship in Poetry; Writers' Conference of the University of Colorado; summer, 1969.
- National Endowment for the Arts grant for poetry 1974–75.
- The New Orleans Review: Annual Poetry Award, 1975.
- The Ossabaw Foundation; residency; spring, 1979.
- National Endowment for the Arts grant for fiction; 1981–82.
- Georgia Council for the Arts and Humanities: Artist-Initiated Grant in Fiction; 1987.
- The Ucross Foundation; residency; August 1998; September 1993.
- The Corporation of Yaddo; residency; August 1994.
- The Palimpsest Prize: Hill Street Press for a most-requested out-of-print book: Fatal Flowers: On Sin, Sex, and Suicide in the Deep South; Fall, 1999.
- The Writers' Colony at Dairy Hollow; residencies; August 2001, 2002, 2003, 2004, 2005, 2006, 2007, 2008.
- Governor's Award for the Arts and Humanities for her contributions to Georgia's literary heritage, 2008.
- William Faulkner-William Wisdom competition, Gold Medal, Poetry; 2009.
- Hambidge Center for the Arts; residency; August 2016, 2015, 2013.
- William Faulkner-William Wisdom, Gold Medal, Poetry Collection: The Murderous Sky; 2019.
- William Faulkner-William Wisdom competition; Gold Medal, Non-fiction Book: My Beautiful Tigers: Forty Years as The Mother of an Opioid Addicted Daughter and a Schizophrenic Son, 2020.

=== Theatre ===
- Native Voices: Rosemary Daniell's voice and work produced in Monologue, along with that of Conrad Aiken and Flannery O'Connor: City Lights Theater, Savannah, Georgia, 1996.
- "A tribute to Rosemary Daniell and her impact on Writing and Writers," was moderated by New York Times Best Selling Author, Bruce Feiler; the Tybee Post Theater on Tybee Island, Georgia. August 11, 2024.

=== Television and Movies ===
- Sleeping with Soldiers :optioned to producer Anath White, 1990–1993.
- In Search of the Macho Man: My Short Life as a Woman Aboard an Offshore Oil Rig: Feature film rights purchased by CBS; 1980.

=== Mixed media ===
- To the Machine I Love: Writer-director-actor; film, slides, electronic sound, poetry, and dance; produced with funds granted through the Georgia Council for the Arts; presented in the Studio Theater of the Atlanta Cultural Center, 1969.
- Photolithography, with photographer Jim Holmes; Savannah Fine Arts Center; Savannah, Georgia; 1993.
- Southern Icons: Photographs by Southern photographers with text by Southern authors, 2016.
