= Steven Silver (actor) =

American actor (born 1989)

- Born: February 1, 1989 (age 37)
- Occupation: Actor
- Years active: 2011–present

Steven Silver (born February 1, 1989) is an American actor, known for his roles in 13 Reasons Why and Council of Dads.

== Career ==
A native of Houston, Texas, Silver made his acting debut in The Problem with Mr. Withers, a short film. He was then cast as Marcus Cole in 13 Reasons Why, appearing as a reoccurring character in the first two seasons. Silver appeared as a minor character in All the Little Things We Kill, which starred RJ Mitte, Elizabeth Marvel, and Scott Cohen. In 2019, Silver starred in The Obituary of Tunde Johnson, an independent drama directed by Ali LeRoi. Silver appeared in the NBC television series Council of Dads.

== Filmography ==
Year	Title	Role	Notes
2011	The Problem with Mr. Withers	Edge	Short
2017–2018	13 Reasons Why	Marcus Cole	18 episodes
2019	All the Little Things We Kill	Mack	
2019	The Obituary of Tunde Johnson	Tunde Johnson	
2020	Council of Dads	Evan Norris	Main role
