= The Obituary of Tunde Johnson =

2019 film directed by Ali LeRoi

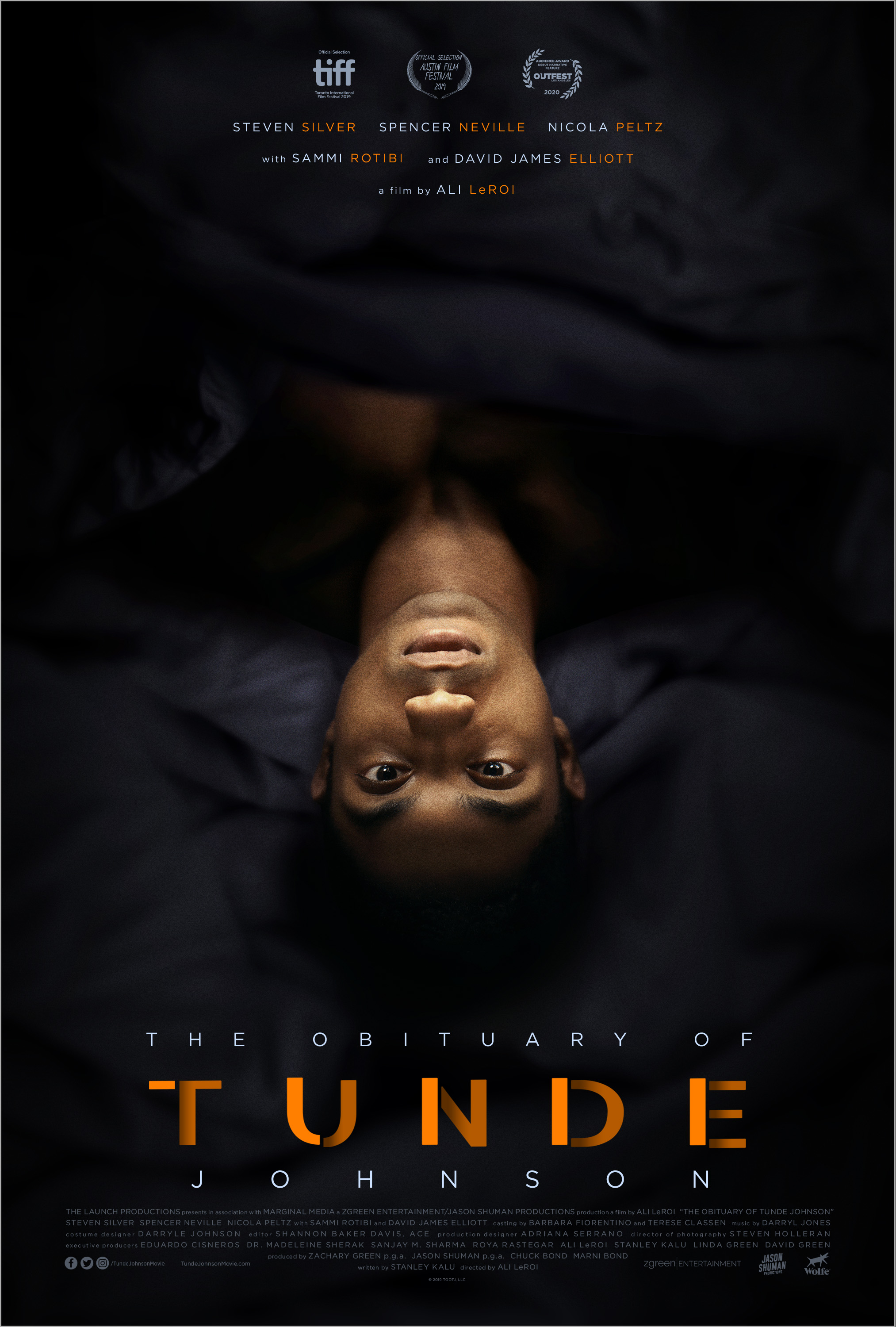
- Film poster
- Directed by: Ali LeRoi
- Written by: Stanley Kalu
- Produced by: Zachary Green; Jason Shuman; Chuck Bond; Marni Bond
- Starring: Steven Silver; Spencer Neville; Nicola Peltz; Sammi Rotibi; David James Elliott
- Distributed by: Wolfe Releasing
- Release date: September 8, 2019 (TIFF)

The Obituary of Tunde Johnson is a 2019 American drama film, directed by Ali LeRoi.

== Premise ==
Tunde Johnson is a gay Nigerian-American teenager who is in a secret relationship with his school's white lacrosse champion Soren. Soren is closeted and officially dating popular girl Marley, Tunde's best friend since childhood. The day of Soren's birthday, when the two boys have planned to come out to their families, Tunde is stopped and fatally shot by a police officer. Following his death, he wakes up the previous morning and becomes trapped in a time loop, forced to relive the day of his murder, which keeps happening in different ways no matter how hard he tries to change it.

== Cast ==
- Steven Silver as Tunde Johnson, a gay African-American teenager who is trapped in a time loop that forces him to repeatedly relive the day of his fatal, racially motivated shooting by a police officer
- Nicola Peltz as Marley Meyers, Tunde's longtime friend
- Spencer Neville as Soren O'Connor, a closeted classmate who is secretly dating both Tunde and Marley in a love triangle
- David James Elliott as Soren's conservative father Alfred, who hosts a talk show about current affairs
- Alessandra Rosaldo as Dr. Martínez, Tunde's therapist
- Sammi Rotibi as Tunde's father Ade
- Tembi Locke as Tunde's mother Yomi

== Production ==
The screenplay was written by Stanley Kalu, a film student at the University of Southern California. It was the first-ever winner of The Launch, a screenwriting competition to find and develop screenplays by promising new writers on which LeRoi was a judge; the competition's prize included the screenplay being produced as a feature film, and LeRoi signed on to direct it as his own feature film debut.

== Release ==
The film premiered at the 2019 Toronto International Film Festival.

== Reception ==
=== Accolades ===
Year	Award	Category	Recipient(s)	Result	Ref.
2022	GLAAD Media Awards	GLAAD Media Award for Outstanding Film – Limited Release	The Obituary of Tunde Johnson	Nominated	

== See also ==
- List of films featuring time loops
