= Bruce Feiler =

American writer and television personality

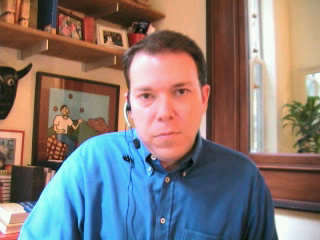
- Born: October 25, 1964 (age 61); Savannah, Georgia, U.S.
- Education: Savannah Country Day School; Yale University B.A. 1987; Cambridge University MPhil International Relations 1991
- Occupations: Writer, journalist, television host
- Notable credit(s): Author of fifteen books; writer-presenter of the PBS miniseries Walking the Bible and Sacred Journeys with Bruce Feiler; creator of Council of Dads; credited with formulating the Feiler faster thesis
- Spouse: Linda Rottenberg
- Children: 2
- Website: www.brucefeiler.com

Bruce Feiler (born October 25, 1964) is an American writer and television personality. He is the author of 15 books, including The Council of Dads, a book that describes how he responded to a diagnosis of a rare cancer by asking a group of men to be present in the lives of his young daughters. The book was the subject of a TED Talk and inspired NBC drama series Council of Dads. His latest work explores the power of life stories. Drawing on interviews with Americans in all 50 states, he offers strategies for coping with life's unsettling times in his new book, Life Is In The Transitions. Bruce writes the "This Life" column in the Sunday New York Times and is also the writer/presenter of the PBS miniseries Walking the Bible and Sacred Journeys with Bruce Feiler (2014).

== Career ==
Feiler is credited with formulating the Feiler faster thesis: the increasing pace of society and journalists' ability to report it is matched by the public's desire for more information.

Publications he has written for include The New Yorker, The New York Times Magazine, and Gourmet, where he won three James Beard Awards. He is also a contributor to National Public Radio, CNN, and Fox News.

A native of Savannah, Georgia, where he attended the Savannah Country Day School and studied with feminist author Rosemary Daniell, Feiler lives in Brooklyn with his wife, Linda Rottenberg, and their twin daughters.

Feiler completed his undergraduate degree at Yale University where he was a member of Ezra Stiles College, before spending time teaching English in Japan as part of the JET Program. This experience led to his first book, Learning to Bow: Inside the Heart of Japan, a portrait of life in a small Japanese town. Upon his return he earned a master's degree in international relations from the University of Cambridge in the United Kingdom, which he chronicled in his book Looking for Class.

== Works ==
Feiler is the author of Life Is In The Transitions, a book that suggests strategies for transforming life's turbulent moments into periods of creativity and growth. Informed by the sifting and coding of life story interviews across America, Feiler examines what gives our lives meaning. Adam Grant called the book, published in May 2020, one of "The 20 New Leadership Books for 2020".

In The Secrets of Happy Families: Improve Your Mornings, Rethink Family Dinner, Fight Smarter, Go Out and Play, and Much More Feiler drew up a blueprint for modern families — a new approach to family dynamics, inspired by techniques gathered from experts in the disciplines of science, business, sports, and the military.

A story he wrote about the book for the New York Times, called The Stories that Bind Us discussed how the more children know about their family history, the higher their well-being and resilience. The piece was on the most-emailed list for a month. Feiler also did a TED talk about the book.

Walking the Bible describes his 10,000-mile journey retracing the Five Books of Moses through the desert. The book was hailed as an "instant classic" by The Washington Post and "thoughtful, informed, and perceptive" by The New York Times. It spent more than a year and a half on The New York Times best-seller list, has been translated into fifteen languages, and is the subject of a children's book and a photography book.

In The Council of Dads: A Story of Family, Friendship & Learning How to Live, Feiler describes how, after learning he had a seven-inch osteosarcoma in his left femur, he asked six men from all passages of his life to be present through the passages of his young daughters' lives. "I believe my daughters will have plenty of opportunities in their lives", he wrote these men. "They'll have loving families. They'll have each other. But they may not have me. They may not have their dad. Will you help be their dad?"

The book was featured on the cover of USA Weekend, on The Today Show, and in People. Dr. Sanjay Gupta made a documentary about the story on CNN. Feiler began an initiative with 23andMe to decode the genome of patients with primary bone cancers. His story inspired the NBC drama series Council of Dads.

Abraham recounts Feiler's search for the shared ancestor of Jews, Christians, and Muslims. The book was featured on the cover of Time magazine, was a New York Times best-seller.

Where God Was Born describes Feiler's year-long trek retracing the Bible through Israel, Iraq, and Iran. America's Prophet: Moses and the American Story discusses the significance of Moses as a symbolic prophet throughout four-hundred years of American history. Both books were New York Times best-sellers. He also wrote about the role of Moses as a defining influence in American life, including the presidency of Barack Obama, in Time magazine.

== Bibliography ==
- The Search: Finding Meaningful Work in a Post-Career World (2023) (ISBN 978-0593298916)
- Life Is In The Transitions: Mastering Change in A Nonlinear Age (2020) (ISBN 1-594-20682-1)
- The First Love Story: Adam, Eve, and Us (2017) (ISBN 978-1-59-420681-8)
- The Secrets of Happy Families: Improve Your Mornings, Rethink Family Dinner, Fight Smarter, Go Out and Play, and Much More (ISBN 978-0-06-177873-5)
- Generation Freedom: The Middle East Uprisings and the Remaking of the Modern World (ISBN 978-0-06-210498-4)
- The Council of Dads: A Story of Family, Friendship & Learning How to Live (2010) (ISBN 0-06-177876-1)
- America's Prophet: Moses and the American Story (2009) (ISBN 0-06-057488-7)
- Walking the Bible: A Photographic Journey (2005) (ISBN 0-06-079904-8)
- Where God Was Born : A Journey by Land to the Roots of Religion (2005) (ISBN 0-06-057487-9)
- Walking the Bible (Children's Edition) : An Illustrated Journey for Kids Through the Greatest Stories Ever Told (2004) (ISBN 0-06-051119-2)
- Abraham : A Journey to the Heart of Three Faiths (2002) (ISBN 0-06-052509-6)
- Walking the Bible: A Journey on Land Through the Five Books of Moses (2001) (ISBN 0-380-80731-9)
- Dreaming Out Loud: Garth Brooks, Wynonna Judd, Wade Hayes, and the Changing Face of Nashville (1998) (ISBN 0-380-79470-5)
- Under the Big Top: A Season with the Circus (1995) (ISBN 0-06-052702-1)
- Looking for Class: Days and Nights at Oxford and Cambridge (1993) (ISBN 0-06-052703-X)
- Learning to Bow: An American Teacher in a Japanese School (1991) (Republished as Learning to Bow: Inside the Heart of Japan) (ISBN 0-06-057720-7)
- Introduction to the 2002 re-launch of H. V. Morton's classic 1936 travelog, In the Steps of St. Paul (ISBN 0-306-81112-X)
