= The Council of Dads (book) =

Book by Bruce Feiler

- Author: Bruce Feiler
- Language: English
- Publisher: William Morrow and Company
- English publication date: April 27, 2010
- ISBN: 978-0-06-177876-6

The Council of Dads: My Daughters, My Illness, and the Men Who Could Be Me was written by Bruce Feiler and published on 27 April 2010 by William Morrow and Company. Written in Feiler's perspective, The Council of Dads is classified as a memoir and biography, focusing on the author's real-life journey grappling with an unexpected osteogenic sarcoma diagnosis in his left femur. The book explores the impact of this life-threatening medical diagnosis on his family, and the importance of rallying friendships and support systems, which Feiler would then refer to as his 'council of dads'.

The success of the memoir gathered interest from production companies and was later considered for TV series adaptations. Whilst generally received in a positive light, the Council of Dads (TV series) was cancelled after its first season with NBC in 2020.

== Synopsis ==
When author Bruce Feiler discovered he had cancer he was worried about his daughters growing up without him by their sides to advise them. He decided to create a "Council of Dads", and wrote a letter which he then read to six of his friends asking them to be father figures to his children.

== Reception ==
Sherryl Connelly writing for the New York Daily News said, "Bruce Feiler's twin daughters, Eden and Tybee, were three when he was diagnosed with a rare form of bone cancer in 2008. Just days afterward, the best-selling Brooklyn author came up with the idea of asking six friends to look out for his daughters should he not survive. Feiler's moving new book, "The Council of Dads", tells their story".

Christine Seib writing for The Times said, "What caused the "tsunami of emotion, horror, fear and sleeplessness" that forced him out of bed that morning was the prospect of leaving the dark-haired toddlers who loved to do a dance that was a mix of ballet, ring-a-roses and the hokey pokey. "I kept coming back to the girls—would they wonder who I was, would they yearn for my voice, my approval, my love?"

Nancy Gibbs writing for Time magazine said, "Bruce Feiler is a writer with diverse interests and an adventurous spirit. His best seller Walking the Bible, about his 10,000-mile trek through the Holy Lands, became a hit PBS series; he wrote a book about his year as a circus clown and one on Abraham—nine books total, but none like his latest, The Council of Dads".

Dennis McCafferty writing for USA Today said, "After author Bruce Feiler was diagnosed with cancer in July 2008, he concluded that he needed to write a letter. Yet, he never put it in the mail. It was written to six of his closest friends, asking them to be there for his then-three-year-old twin daughters, Eden and Tybee, in the event of his passing. Each man represented a different era of Feiler's life and a different aspect of Feiler's personality that he wanted passed on to his girls. In the letter, Feiler asked them to join what he described as 'The Council of Dads' that would live on well after he was gone".

Steve Myall writing in The Daily Mirror said, "Dying young and leaving your children to grow up without your love and guidance is a nightmare most parents dare not even contemplate. But that was the chilling prospect facing devoted 45-year-old father of two Bruce Feiler when he was told a seven-inch cancerous tumor was growing in his thigh. At the time his twin daughters Eden and Tybee were just three years old and the terror of facing his own death was overshadowed by his fears for his girls' futures".

Bella DePaulo writing in Psychology Today said, "Have you heard of "The Council of Dads"? It is a concept, a set of friends, and the title of a new book by Bruce Feiler. The author, at age 43, was diagnosed with a rare and potentially deadly form of cancer. Wracked with worry that his twin daughters, then three years old, might grow up without him, Feiler decided to assemble what he called a council of dads for his girls. The council was actually a group of six of his friends, who would go on to become his daughters' friends as well".

== Adaptations ==
=== Fox TV pilot ===
In 2011, Fox picked up a single camera, half-hour comedy Council of Dads pilot from Peter Tolan and Sony Pictures Television. It was directed by Anthony and Joe Russo and starred Diane Farr, Ken Howard, Rick Gomez, Patrick Breen, Kyle Bornheimer, and Richard T. Jones. The pilot was not ordered to series.

=== NBC TV series ===
In October 2018, NBC announced that Joan Rater and Tony Phelan were developing a new Council of Dads series inspired by the book. This story is about Scott, a loving father of four, has his entire life's plan thrown into upheaval by a cancer diagnosis, he calls on a few of his closest allies to step in as back-up dads for every stage of his growing family's life. Scott assembles a trusted group of role models that includes Anthony, his oldest friend; Larry, his AA sponsor; and Oliver, his surgeon and best friend to his wife, Robin. These men agree to devote themselves to supporting and guiding Scott's amazing family through all the triumphs and challenges life has to offer – just in case he ever can't be there to do so himself. Sarah Wayne Callies was cast as Robin and Clive Standen as Anthony Lavelle. The series premiered on March 24, 2020.
