= Jo Feiler =

American photographer (born 1951)

- Born: 1951 (age 74–75)
- Occupation: Photographer

Jo Alison Feiler (born 1951) is an American photographer.

Her work is included in the collections of the Getty Museum, Los Angeles, the Tate Museum, London, the National Portrait Gallery, London the Brooklyn Museum, New York, and the Metropolitan Museum of Art, New York. 47 of her photographs are included in the Los Angeles County Museum of Art collection.
