= Council of Dads (TV series) =

2020 American drama television series

- Genre: Drama
- Created by: Joan Rater & Tony Phelan
- Inspired by: The Council of Dads by Bruce Feiler
- Starring: Sarah Wayne Callies; Clive Standen; J. August Richards; Michele Weaver; Emjay Anthony; Thalia Tran; Blue Chapman; Steven Silver; Michael O'Neill
- Music by: Fil Eisler
- Country of origin: United States
- Original language: English
- No. of seasons: 1
- No. of episodes: 10

Production
- Executive producers: James Strong; KristieAnne Reed; Jonathan Littman; Joan Rater; Tony Phelan; Jerry Bruckheimer
- Producers: Bruce Feiler; James Oh; Michael Pendell
- Cinematography: Jonathan Brown; Todd A. Dos Reis
- Editors: Philip Fowler; Nicole Artzer; Farrel Jane Levy; Jamin Bricker
- Camera setup: Single-camera
- Running time: 43 minutes
- Production companies: Jerry Bruckheimer Television; Midwest Livestock Productions; Universal Television

Original release
- Network: NBC
- Release: March 24 – July 2, 2020

Council of Dads is an American drama television series inspired by the book The Council of Dads by Bruce Feiler, developed by Joan Rater and Tony Phelan, that premiered on NBC as part of the 2019–20 television season, on March 24, 2020. In June 2020, the series was canceled after one season.

== Premise ==
Cancer patient Scott Perry worries about his five children growing up without his help and advice. He and his wife Robin recruit three friends to act as a "council of dads" to be father figures to his children. Scott dies and his loved ones form an expanded chosen family.

== Cast ==
=== Main ===
- Sarah Wayne Callies as Dr. Robin Perry, Scott's widow

Her children

- Michele Weaver as Luly Perry, Anthony's biracial daughter, whom Scott raised as a single father for eight years (thinking she was his daughter) before meeting Robin
- Emjay Anthony as Theo Perry, Scott and Robin's temperamental teenage son
- Thalia Tran as Charlotte Perry, Scott and Robin's adopted daughter, who is of Chinese ancestry
- Blue Chapman as JJ Perry, Scott and Robin's seven-year-old transgender son, who was assigned female at birth

The Council of Dads

- Michael O'Neill as Larry Mills, Scott's Alcoholics Anonymous sponsee
- Clive Standen as Anthony Lavelle, Scott's best friend, as well as Luly's biological father, unknown to Luly or the rest of the family
- J. August Richards as Dr. Oliver Post, Robin's best friend since medical school

- Steven Silver as Evan Norris, Luly's husband

=== Special guest stars ===
- Tom Everett Scott as Scott Perry

=== Recurring ===
- Lindsey Blackwell as Tess, Oliver and Peter's daughter
- Kevin Daniels as Peter Richards, Oliver's husband and Tess' other father
- Hilarie Burton as Margot

== Episodes ==
No.	Title	Directed by	Written by	Original release date	U.S viewers (millions)
1	"Pilot"	James Strong	Joan Rater & Tony Phelan	March 24, 2020	3.75
Scott Perry discovers he has terminal cancer and decides to try to secure a future for his children. He asks three of his closest friends to form a "council of dads" that will look after his family and be father figures for his children in the event of his passing. The council of dads consists of Anthony Lavelle, Scott's best friend; Oliver Post, his wife Robin's best friend; and Larry Mills, Scott's AA sponsor.
2	"I'm Not Fine"	James Strong	Joan Rater & Tony Phelan	April 30, 2020	2.01
3	"Who Do You Wanna Be?"	Jonathan Brown	Tia Napolitano	May 7, 2020	2.98
4	"The Sixth Stage"	Christopher Misiano	Bert V. Royal	May 14, 2020	2.78
5	"Tradition!"	Lily Mariye	Imogen Binnie	May 28, 2020	2.74
6	"Heart Medicine"	Geary McLeod	Pamela Garcia Rooney	June 4, 2020	2.78
7	"The Best-Laid Plans"	Nicole Rubio	Jason Wilborn	June 11, 2020	2.75
8	"Dear Dad"	Benny Boom	David Gould	June 18, 2020	2.73
9	"Stormy Weather"	Jonathan Brown	Heather Robb	June 25, 2020	2.94
10	"Fight or Flight"	Tony Phelan	Joan Rater & Tony Phelan	July 2, 2020	2.75

== Production ==
=== Development ===
On January 14, 2019, it was announced that NBC had given the production a pilot order under the name Council of Dads. The pilot was written by Joan Rater and Tony Phelan who executive produces alongside Jerry Bruckheimer, Jonathan Littman, KristieAnne Reed and producers are James Oh, Bruce Feiler. Production companies involved with the pilot include Jerry Bruckheimer Television, Midwest Livestock Productions and Universal Television. On May 7, 2019, it was announced that the production had been given a series order. A few days later, it was announced that the series would premiere as a mid-season replacement in the spring of 2020. On January 11, 2020, it was announced that the series would premiere on March 10, 2020. On February 26, 2020, the premiere date was moved to March 24, 2020. On June 25, 2020, NBC canceled the series after one season.

=== Casting ===
In February 2019, it was announced that Sarah Wayne Callies and Clive Standen had been cast in the pilot's lead roles. Alongside the pilot's order announcement, in March 2019 it was reported that Michael O'Neill, Steven Silver, and Emjay Anthony had joined the cast.

=== Filming ===
The series was filmed in Savannah, Georgia.

== Reception ==
=== Critical response ===
On Rotten Tomatoes, the series has an approval rating of 50% based on 10 reviews, with an average rating of 5.8/10. The website's critical consensus reads, "Council of Dads's talented cast tries its best, but its first season is too superficial to make the emotional moves necessary to really connect." On Metacritic, it has a weighted average score of 53 out of 100 based on 5 reviews, indicating "mixed or average reviews".

=== Ratings ===
Viewership and ratings per episode of Council of Dads
No.	Title	Air date	Rating/share (18–49)	Viewers (millions)	DVR (18–49)	DVR viewers (millions)	Total (18–49)	Total viewers (millions)
1	"Pilot"	March 24, 2020	0.7/2	3.75	0.2	1.16	0.9	4.91
2	"I'm Not Fine"	April 30, 2020	0.3/1	2.01	0.2	1.22	0.5	3.23
3	"Who Do You Wanna Be?"	May 7, 2020	0.4/1	2.98	0.1	0.72	0.5	3.70
4	"The Sixth Stage"	May 14, 2020	0.4/1	2.78	0.2	0.83	0.5	3.59
5	"Tradition!"	May 28, 2020	0.4/2	2.74	0.1	0.95	0.6	3.69
6	"Heart Medicine"	June 4, 2020	0.4/2	2.78	0.2	0.93	0.5	3.66
7	"The Best-Laid Plans"	June 11, 2020	0.3/2	2.75	0.2	0.92	0.4	3.67
8	"Dear Dad"	June 18, 2020	0.3/2	2.73	0.2	0.87	0.5	3.60
9	"Stormy Weather"	June 25, 2020	0.4/2	2.94	0.1	0.69	0.5	3.63
10	"Fight or Flight"	July 2, 2020	0.3/2	2.75	0.1	0.68	0.5	3.42
