= Feiler faster thesis =

Idea linking faster news cycles and society

The Feiler faster thesis (FFT) is a thesis, or supported argument, in modern journalism that suggests that the increasing pace of society is matched by (and perhaps driven by) journalists' ability to report events and the public's desire for more information.

== Origin ==
The idea is credited to Bruce Feiler and first defined by Mickey Kaus in a February 24, 2000 Kausfiles blog post and Slate online magazine article, "Faster Politics: 'Momentum' ain't what it used to be". In an article published two weeks later, on March 9, 2000, Kaus gave the theory the name "Feiler faster thesis".

In the original article, Kaus describes two trends: the speeding up of the news cycle and the compression of the schedule of primaries for the 2000 U.S. general election. Kaus wrote: "Feiler's point is that we should put these two trends together--and that when we do, Trend 1 considerably softens the impact of Trend 2." Kaus uses the observation to reassess the concept of momentum in politics, suggesting that there are now simply more opportunities for turns of fortune and that voters are able, for the most part, to keep up.

== Definition refined ==
Kaus's second interpretation in a later article is broader and more succinct:

The news cycle is much faster these days, thanks to 24-hour cable, the Web, a metastasized pundit caste constantly searching for new angles, etc. As a result, politics is able to move much faster, too, as our democracy learns to process more information in a shorter period and to process it comfortably at this faster pace.

== Application ==
The idea is based on James Gleick's 1999 book Faster, which makes the argument that the pace of Western society in general, and American society in particular, has increased and that "a compression of time characterizes the life of the century now closing". Gleick documents the ways technology speeds up work and the time people spend doing various tasks, including sleeping. He points out that "we have learned to keep efficiency in mind as a goal, which means that we drive ourselves hard." Gleick's key observation is that "some of us say we want to save time when really we just want to do more".

The thesis is sometimes misinterpreted as merely describing the shortening of the news cycle, which is actually covered as part of Gleick's original observations. Kaus recognized the difference in a 2005 posting: "The FFT, remember, doesn't say that information moves with breathtaking speed these days. (Everyone knows that!) The FFT says that people are comfortable processing that information with what seems like breathtaking speed." [emphasis in the original]
