= La Bougie du Sapeur =

French satirical newspaper published only on Leap Day

- sans reproche ("without reproach")
- Type: Quadrennial newspaper
- Founder(s): Jacques Debuisson, Christian Bailly
- Editor: Jean d'Indy
- Founded: 29 February 1980
- Language: French
- Headquarters: 17, rue Saint-Paul; Paris 75004; France
- City: Paris
- Country: France
- Circulation: 200,000
- ISSN: 0761-6147
- OCLC number: 474123818

La Bougie du Sapeur (French: [la bu.ʒi dy sa.pœʁ]) is a French satirical newspaper launched in 1980 that is published only on Leap Day, making it the world's least frequently published newspaper. The editor-in-chief is Jean d'Indy, who works for France Galop and has been involved in producing the paper since 1992.

== History ==
La Bougie du Sapeur was created in 1980 by Jacques Debuisson and Christian Bailly, as a joke between friends. The newspaper's name, which translates as 'The Sapper's Candle', refers to Camember, a sapper in a comic created by Georges Colomb in 1896. The fictional Camember was born on 29 February and joined the army when he had celebrated his birthday only four times.

== Availability ==
The paper is published every four years on 29 February; as of 2024, 200,000 copies are printed and sold at newsagents and newsstands. The price was €4.70 in 2016, €4.90 in 2024. Subscriptions are available – €100 per century – and back issues are €15. The paper is not published online. The 2016 edition was the first to be sold in Belgium, Switzerland, Luxembourg, and Canada as well as France.

The first edition of La Bougie du Sapeur – Dimanche, a special Sunday supplement, was published in 2004; the next edition will not be published until 2032.

Profits from the 2008 and 2012 editions went to charity.

== Contents ==
The paper is humorous, self-described as "anti-politically correct". A 2012 story on the end of the Euro led readers to believe that the paper supported the politics of the far‑right Front National, but the editor‑in‑chief maintained that the paper is apolitical. The lead story in the 2024 edition was a commentary on artificial intelligence titled "We will all be intelligent"; the second lead was on problems of gender transitioning, titled "What men need to know before becoming women".

In addition to articles, La Bougie du Sapeur includes a serialised story, "The Drowning in the Pool".
