= Bob Satterfield (cartoonist) =

American cartoonist (1875–1958)

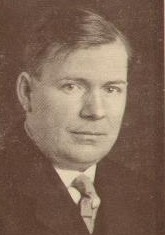
- Born: Robert William Satterfield; October 18, 1875 Sharon, Pennsylvania, US
- Died: February 17, 1958 (aged 82) Glendale, California, US
- Area: Cartoonist
- Pseudonym: Sat
- Spouse: Alma Cryder (d. 1905)

Robert William Satterfield (October 18, 1875 in Sharon, Pennsylvania– February 17, 1958 in Glendale, California), also known as "Sat", was an American cartoonist known for his editorial cartoons; he also created the comic strips The Family Next Door, Oh Thunder, and The Bicker Family; as well as the daily panels Sat's Bear and Days We'll Never Forget, as well as Bizzy Bear.

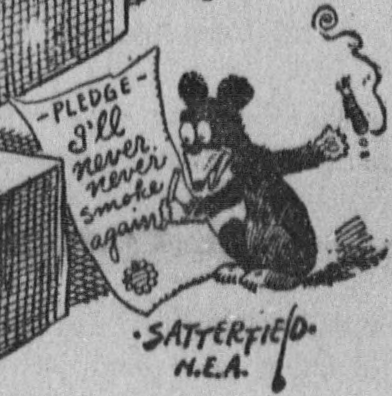
"Sat's Bear" in 1903 cartoon. This bear often appeared within Satterfield's cartoons — often with commentary

Satterfield's career began in 1896 when, after having studied art as a part-time student in Pittsburgh, he moved to Youngstown, Ohio for work and began sending unsolicited cartoons (most of which were based on the William Jennings Bryan presidential campaign) to the Cleveland Press; the Press's editor eventually bought one, and hired Satterfield as a regular artist. In 1898, Satterfield was transferred to the Kansas City World, where he functioned as that paper's entire art department for four years until 1902, when Mark Hanna hired him to be a full-time cartoonist for the Cleveland News. By 1917, Editor and Publisher said that his work had "the largest circulation of any syndicated cartoons" in the United States.

In 1924, Satterfield signed an exclusive contract with Publishers Autocaster Service; later, he worked for the Newspaper Enterprise Association. In 1928, he produced Picture Life of a Great American: Pictorial Life of Herbert Hoover, a prototype of a comic book, in association with the Herbert Hoover presidential campaign. In 1934, he left the Cleveland News and joined the Green Bay Press-Gazette.
