= Gibson's Bakery v. Oberlin College =

Ohio court case on libel and tortious interference

Gibsons Bros., Inc. v. Oberlin College
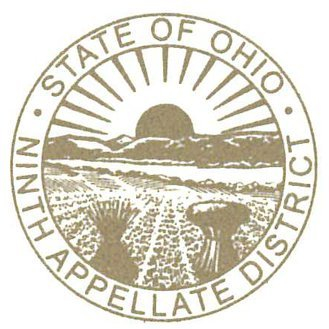
- Court: Ohio District Courts of Appeals, Ninth Judicial District
- Full case name: Gibson Bros., Inc. v. Oberlin College
- Decided: March 31, 2022
- Citation: 2022 Ohio 1079, 187 N.E.3d 629 (Ohio Ct. App. 2022)

Case history
- Appealed from: Court of Common Pleas, County of Lorain, Ohio; Case No. 17CV193761
- Appealed to: Supreme Court of Ohio: Jurisdiction declined, August 30, 2022

Court membership
- Judges sitting: Donna Carr, Jennifer L. Hensal, and Betty Sutton

Case opinions
- Decision by: Carr, J.
- Concurrence: Hensal and Sutton JJ.

Keywords
- Libel, Slander, Tortious interference

Gibson's Bakery v. Oberlin College was an Ohio legal case concerning libel, tortious interference, and infliction of distress. The case ultimately involved questions about the responsibilities of universities during student protests.

The case began in 2016 with an incident of shoplifting by a black Oberlin College student at Gibson's Bakery and subsequent arrest of three black students for assaulting a staff member of Gibson's Bakery. Students, faculty members, and employees of the college protested against the bakery, alleging racism. The owners of the bakery sued the college, and Dean Meredith Raimondo in her individual capacity, for directly and indirectly supporting the protests, engaging in tortious interference of business, and for defaming the owners and employees. In 2019, a jury found in favor of Gibson's and awarded $44 million in compensatory and punitive damages (capped to $25 million due to state law), plus $6.5 million in legal fees.

Upon appeal, in 2022 the Ninth District Court of Appeals upheld the verdict 3–0. The college sought review by the Supreme Court of Ohio; the court declined jurisdiction of the appeal. The college then agreed to pay the judgment and interest, now totaling $36.59 million. In December 2022, Gibson's confirmed it had received the payment in full.

== Background ==
Gibson's Bakery is a fifth-generation family business established in Oberlin, Ohio, in 1885. Half of the city's 8,000 residents are students or employees—3,000 and 1,000 respectively—of Oberlin College. Local merchants are reportedly frequent targets of shoplifting by students of the school. According to police records, there were four robberies at Gibson's Bakery and 40 adults were arrested for shoplifting between 2011 and 2016, 33 of whom were college students. According to Gibson's, the bakery loses thousands of dollars to shoplifters every year. The owner of a nearby Ben Franklin store reported losing more than $10,000 a year to shoplifters. A college publication described shoplifting as a rite of passage.

=== 2016 shoplifting incident ===
On November 9, 2016, underage black Oberlin College student Jonathan Aladin attempted to purchase a bottle of wine using a fake identification card. Store clerk Allyn D. Gibson, a son and grandson of the owners, noticed that the student was concealing two other bottles of wine inside his jacket. According to the police report, Gibson told Aladin that he was contacting the police and pulled out his phone to take a photo of the student, which Aladin slapped away, striking Gibson's face in the process.

Aladin ran out of the store, and Gibson followed him across the street onto campus property where a scuffle broke out. When police arrived, Gibson was lying on the ground being punched and kicked by Aladin and two other female Oberlin students, friends of Aladin. The police report stated that Gibson sustained a swollen lip, several cuts, and other minor injuries. The police arrested the students, charging all three with assault and Aladin with robbery as well.

In August 2017, the three students pleaded guilty, stating that they believed that Gibson's actions were justified and were not racially motivated. Their plea deals carried no jail time in exchange for restitution, the public statement, and a promise of future good behavior.

=== Student protest and boycott ===
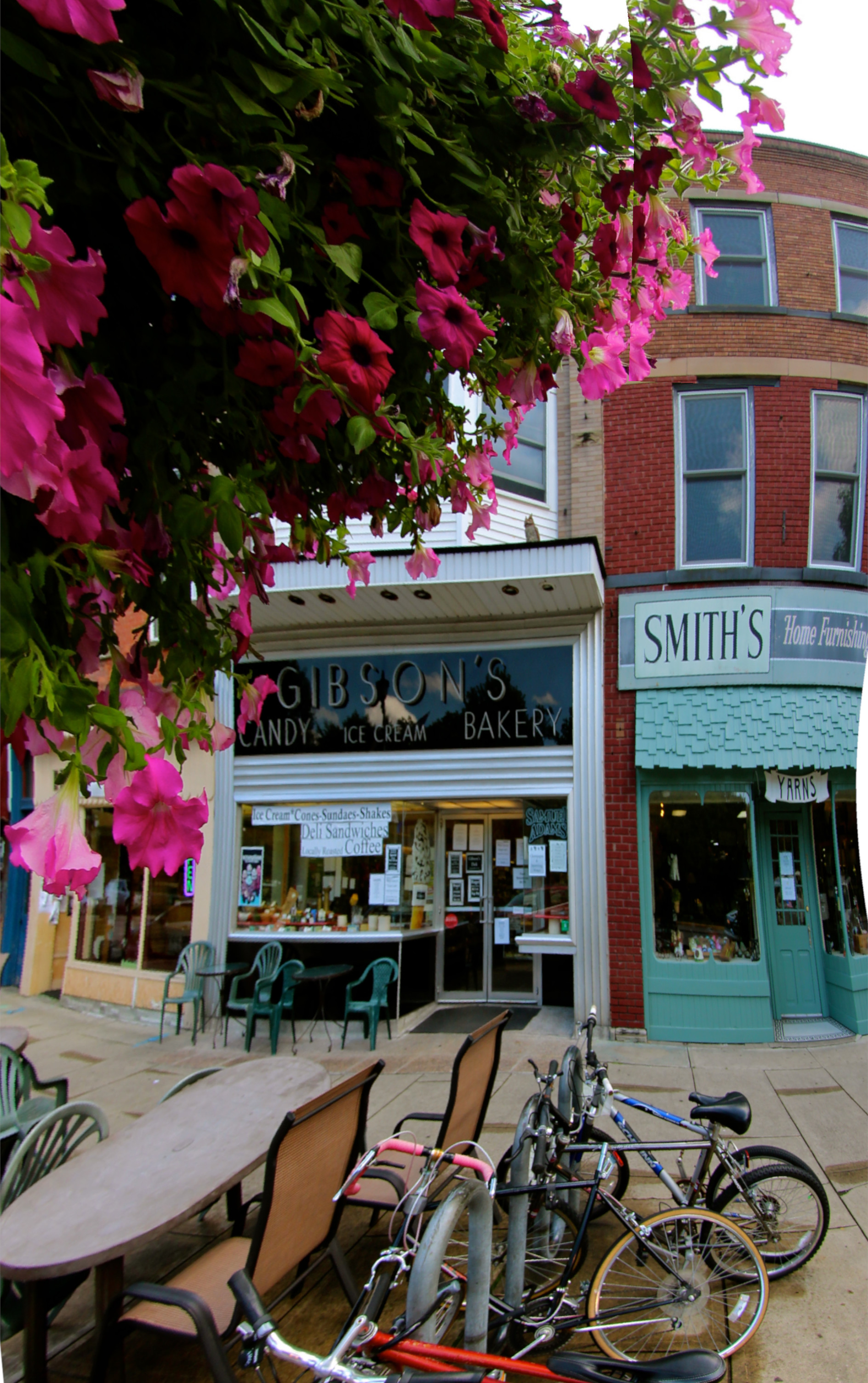
Gibson's Bakery storefront, where the protests occurred

The day after the incident, faculty and hundreds of students gathered in a park across the street from Gibson's Bakery protesting what they saw as racial profiling and excessive use of force by Gibson toward Aladin. Jason Hawk, a reporter and editor with the Oberlin News-Tribune, testified that dean of students Meredith Raimondo was at the protest using a megaphone to speak to the gathering and discouraging photographers from taking photos of the crowd. He testified that she used her body to attempt to block him from taking photos, and handed him a flyer. The flyer read, "Don't Buy. This is a RACIST establishment with a LONG ACCOUNT of RACIAL PROFILING and DISCRIMINATION." Counter protestors also gathered, calling the students "snowflakes".

The Oberlin Student Senate immediately passed a resolution saying that the bakery "has a history of racial profiling and discriminatory treatment of students and residents alike", calling for all students to "immediately cease all support, financial and otherwise, of Gibson's" and calling upon Oberlin College President Marvin Krislov to publicly condemn the bakery. The Student Senate resolution was emailed to all Oberlin students and was publicly mounted in a display case at the school's student center, where it remained for a year.

=== Oberlin response ===
On November 11, 2016, the day after the initial student protest, Oberlin College released a joint statement by President Marvin Krislov and Dean of Students Meredith Raimondo, saying they were "deeply troubled" by the events and would investigate "whether this is a pattern and not an isolated incident" of discrimination. The statement was emailed to all students and posted in The Oberlin Review, the school's newspaper.

Raimondo ordered its campus food provider to suspend its purchasing agreement with the bakery, with ratification by Krislov. The agreement was suspended for about two months, which the school said was an attempt to de-escalate the protests. During a meeting with Gibson's, Oberlin stated that it would consider reinstating the business relationship if the bakery agreed to not bring criminal charges against first-time shoplifters. According to the civil complaint filed by the bakery, Gibson's was worried that such a policy would cause an increase in future shoplifting.

At trial, lawyers for the Gibsons introduced emails and text messages showing that some senior Oberlin administrative staff were angry about the conviction of the three students and did not want the college to resolve the situation with Gibson's. One assistant dean in attendance of the students' trial texted Raimondo from the courthouse "I hope we rain fire and brimstone on that store." In an email, Oberlin's Vice President of Communications pushed back against claims that the college was hurting a "small business", calling the Gibson family a "massive (relative to the town) conglomerate" engaged in "predatory behavior toward most other local business. Fuck 'em." Oberlin's Special Assistant to the President responded, "100%!!!!!!!"

Retired Oberlin professor Roger Copeland was critical of the protests, writing a year after the protests began, "The time has come for the Dean of Students Meredith Raimondo, on behalf of the College, to apologize to the Gibson family." Raimondo reacted to Copeland's statement in a private text message: "Fuck him. I'd say unleash the students if I wasn't convinced this needs to be put behind us."

An employee in the college's communications department sent an email to her supervisor saying that she found the protests "very disturbing", and that according to non-white friends she had spoken to, "this is not a race issue at all". This email was forwarded around by senior administrators, and one responded, "Doesn't change a damn thing for me." Another responded, "Gibson's is not clean on this ... The police report is bullshit, so obviously biased toward the Gibson's."

A former administrator said that Oberlin's recent drop in enrollment caused the school to be wary of disagreeing with its students. "A freshman from an East Coast big city might come to Oberlin and find there is little for a social justice warrior to do in a small town like this, so they get frustrated and make issues like this shoplifting thing bigger than it should be, and the school follows along."

== Lawsuit and trial ==
=== Civil complaint ===
In November 2017, Gibson's Bakery filed a civil complaint against Oberlin and Raimondo for libel, slander, interference with business relationships, and interference with contracts in the Lorain County Court of Common Pleas. Gibson's argued that the college supported the protests that damaged its reputation and that the college unlawfully broke its contract with the bakery. In the complaint, the Gibson family alleged that some Oberlin College professors attended the demonstrations, joined in the chants with a bullhorn, and gave course credit to students who skipped class to attend the demonstrations. It also claimed Oberlin employees distributed boycott flyers and allowed them to be photocopied for free on school machines. Gibson's claimed that Oberlin faculty and representatives directly contributed to defaming the bakery; for example, prospective students were told during college tours that Gibson's was a "racist establishment" that "assaults students", and the Department of Africana Studies posted on Facebook that "their dislike of Black people is palpable" and "they profile Black students".

Oberlin responded to the complaint, saying Gibson committed "violent physical assault" against Aladin, and that the bakery was "attempting to profit from a divisive and polarizing event".

=== Trial ===
The six-week jury trial began after more than a year of pre-trial proceedings since the original complaint. Three central issues were addressed at trial: whether the flyers distributed during the protests were defamatory; whether the Senate Resolution was defamatory; and whether Oberlin College bore responsibility for those defamatory statements. Statements made by students during the protests were not part of the trial.

After the shoplifting incident, local police investigated whether Gibson's had a history of racially motivated shoplifting reports. According to the probe, in a five year period, only six of the forty adults arrested for shoplifting at Gibson's were black. Both college and police records showed no previous accusations of racial profiling by Gibson's Bakery. A black former employee of the bakery testified that the racist allegations were not true. "In my life, I have been a marginalized person, so I know what it feels like to be called something that you know you're not. I could feel his pain. I knew where he was coming from." Clarence "Trey" James, a Black employee at Gibson's since 2013, testified that he had observed no racist treatment of customers or employees. James told The Oberlin Review, "When you steal from the store, it doesn't matter what color you are. You can be purple, blue, green; if you steal, you get caught, you get arrested."

Much of the trial was focused on the flyers distributed at the protests. Jason Hawk testified that Raimondo directly handed him a flyer at the protest. Evidence was shown that Oberlin's director of media relations emailed him to retract it, and after Hawk insisted it was Raimondo, she emailed back, "He is a liar." During trial, Raimondo admitted she gave him the flyer. Arguments were also made that Oberlin had at least indirectly assisted in the distribution of flyers. During the protest, Oberlin officials bought the protesting students pizza, and authorized the use of student funds for the purchase of winter gloves for students protesting in cold weather. Some professors gave credit to students who skipped class to attend the protests. Oberlin argued that this was not an endorsement of the protests; Gibson's argued that this sent a signal to the students that the college had picked a side.

For the Senate Resolution, the jury heard arguments that Oberlin had assisted its distribution, because it had given the student senate the ability to email the resolution to the entire student body, along with permanently displaying it in a display case within the student center. In the same building that Raimondo worked from, it could be seen by students and visitors for nearly a year, but Raimondo did not request it be removed until shortly after the lawsuit was filed.

Oberlin argued that it had no responsibility for the protests and that Gibson's "archaic chase-and-detain policy" was to blame. Raimondo repeatedly insisted that she did not have control over students and could not have stopped the protests. Gibson's disagreed, pointing to the fact that students removed the Senate Resolution from display at Raimondo's request. Conor Friedersdorf, a writer for The Atlantic, argued that when Raimondo said she wanted to "unleash the students" at Roger Copeland, it indicated that college administrators at Oberlin "calculatingly wield some control" over protests.

Oberlin argued that if there were written statements made that said Gibson's was racist, they could not be defamatory as they were opinions.

The Gibson family hired an accountant to review tax documents and financial records to determine financial damages. He determined that the family suffered from a reduction in store revenue and rental income from their rental properties, and that the reduced cash flow delayed their plans to build additional rental properties near campus. He determined this would continue to have an effect for thirty years and predicted the total losses to be $5.8 million. Oberlin hired an economist to provide expert testimony that the thirty year figure was too long and the calculated damages were too high; in his testimony, the economist determined that the bakery was worth only $35,000 and therefore that figure would limit the maximum damages possible.

Gibson's tried to introduce expert witness testimony from accountant Richard Maggiore that it would cost the family $13 million to restore its reputation. However, Judge Miraldi excluded this testimony as unreliable and "more akin to an advertising or marketing proposal".

During the trial, Oberlin filed a motion for a new trial because it claimed that the jury instructions gave an incorrect definition of "negligence". However, the trial court denied the motion because Oberlin did not provide citations to support its claim. Oberlin also argued for a new trial due to prejudicial exclusion of evidence. For example, Gibson's was able to present evidence and testimony that it did not have a history of racial discrimination, but Oberlin was not able to present contrary evidence. The trial court denied this motion because Oberlin's excluded evidence was hearsay, a point that Oberlin did not argue against.

=== Verdict ===
In June 2019, the jury found in favor of the Gibson family, awarding $11 million in compensatory damages, before further hearings on punitive damages and legal fees. In a statement a few days later, President Carmen Twillie Ambar vowed to continue fighting, saying, "This is not the final outcome."

The jury later awarded the plaintiffs $33 million in punitive damages, for a total award of $44 million. At the end of the month, Judge John Miraldi reduced the total award to $25 million because state law limits punitive damages. In July 2019, the court ordered Oberlin to pay an additional $6.5 million as reimbursement for Gibson's attorney fees and other legal expenses.

Oberlin released a statement disagreeing with the outcome, asserting that not only did the school not defame the bakery, but it also attempted to repair the damage caused by the protests. "Colleges cannot be held liable for the independent actions of their students." In an interview with NPR, President Ambar said Oberlin was considering appeal. "This is a first amendment case about whether an institution can be held liable for the speech of its students and the actions of its students." Ambar told CBSN, "There may have been some professors who were there operating in their own individual capacity, but they weren't representing the institution." Attorney Lee Plakas, representing the Gibson family in the trial, responded, "The recent efforts of Oberlin College and President Ambar to reframe this as a First Amendment issue, while undermining the jury's decision, should be incredibly concerning to us all. Oberlin College was never on trial for the free speech of its students. Instead, the jury unanimously determined that Oberlin College libeled the Gibsons."

Local television station WEWS-TV petitioned Judge Miraldi for more than two years to unseal evidence heard at trial. In September 2021, the judge unsealed remarks Allyn D. Gibson made on his Facebook account from 2012 to 2017 in which he expressed resentment for being accused of racism and made disparaging remarks about a large portion of the local Black community. These posts were not offered or allowed as evidence at trial. The Gibsons' attorneys argued that since Oberlin College attorneys did not attempt to introduce the Facebook posts as evidence, they "waived any argument that these materials were admissible".

=== Appeals ===
On October 8, 2019, the college appealed the case to the Ohio Ninth District Court. In its appeal, Oberlin argued that the court had erred in four ways: first, that the court should have entered a judgment notwithstanding verdict (JNOV) in favor of Oberlin; second, that the court should have granted Oberlin's earlier motion for a new trial; third, that the damages awarded to Gibson's were exorbitant even after caps were applied; and fourth, that Oberlin disagreed with the lodestar method used to calculate Gibson's attorney fees.

Gibson's Bakery filed its own appeal days later asking for review of Ohio's statutory caps on monetary damages. Gibson's argued that statutory limits on monetary damages were unconstitutional for libel and slander cases. It also appealed the trial court's decision to exclude Maggiore's expert testimony.

Oberlin College filed its principal appeals brief June 5, 2020. Oral arguments by the parties were made in the Ohio Ninth District Court of Appeals on November 11, 2020, and made public on YouTube.

On March 31, 2022, the Ninth Ohio District Court of Appeals dismissed both appeals. In a 3–0 decision, the court upheld the jury verdict against Oberlin and the cap in damages awarded to Gibson's. The court ruled that a reasonable jury would have concluded the Senate Resolution could not have had the effect it did without the assistance from Oberlin, and therefore the college was not entitled to a JNOV. It also argued that the damages awarded to Gibson's were not exorbitant and that the trial court did not err in its denied motion for a new trial or in its calculation of Gibson's attorney fees. Oberlin was ordered to pay the original decision's damages and attorney's fees.

Oberlin sought review by the Supreme Court of Ohio on May 13, 2022, and later moved to stay enforcement of the $31.3 million award and fees. The Court granted Oberlin College's motion for stay while it considered the parties' briefs but declined to accept jurisdiction on August 30, 2022, on a 4–3 ruling: Chief Justice O'Connor and Justices Kennedy, Fischer and DeWine declined jurisdiction, while Justices Donnelly, Stewart, and Brunner JJ. dissented.

Oberlin published a statement expressing disappointment in the Supreme Court's decision. "The issues raised by this case have been challenging, not only for the parties involved but for the entire Oberlin community." Attorneys for Gibson's said in a statement that the school "tried to frame this case with claims and issues that weren't on trial ... This has never been a case about a student's first amendment rights. Individuals' reputations should never be sacrificed at a false altar of free speech."

=== Payment and further litigation ===
On September 8, 2022, Oberlin College announced that the Trustees had determined the college "would not pursue the matter further" and had agreed to pay Gibson's Bakery the sum of $36.59 million representing the judgment with interest. In December 2022, Gibson's Bakery confirmed it had received the full amount. The college stated, "This matter has been painful for everyone. We hope that the end of the litigation will begin the healing of our entire community."

On April 17, 2023, Oberlin College filed suit against its own insurance companies for refusing to cover the judgment paid to Gibson's Bakery. The suit was filed in the Lorain County Court of Common Pleas. According to the filing, Oberlin performed mock jury exercises in April 2019 and determined it was likely it would lose the Gibson's lawsuit; however, its insurance companies refused to fund a settlement even after Oberlin negotiated an offer to avoid trial for less than $10 million. In September 2023, two of the insurance companies filed defenses to the Oberlin lawsuit, denying that they were in breach of the insurance policies.

In April and May, 2024, Oberlin College settled the cases with the four insurance companies. The terms of the settlements were confidential, but a spokesperson for the college stated that the settlements were substantial.

== Reactions ==
The National Coalition Against Censorship, Defending Rights & Dissent, and more than 12 other first amendment scholars filed amicus briefs arguing that the verdict was unconstitutional and would have a negative effect on first amendment protections. "While many disagree with the substance and manner of how the students chose to express their sincerely held opinions, the First Amendment does not permit the government to enforce content-based restrictions on others opinion."

According to Daniel McGraw, a reporter who covered the trial for the Washington Examiner, the largest contributing factor to the protests was the election of Donald Trump as President the day before. In the opinion of attorney and Cornell law professor William A. Jacobson, "On a different campus on a different day, it is unlikely a simple shoplifting case would have gained much attention." In his November 2016 letter to faculty and students, Oberlin President Krislov acknowledged the relationship between the protests and the "fears and concerns that many are feeling in response to the outcome of the presidential election".
