= Osca =

Osca or OSCA may refer to:

- O.S.C.A., a brand of Italian racing cars and sports cars
- Oberlin Student Cooperative Association, a non-profit student cooperative at Oberlin College
- Huesca or Osca, a city in Spain
- Huéscar, Granada or Osca, a municipality in Spain
- Osca (fly), a genus of horse-fly
- "OSCA" (song), by Japanese band Tokyo Jihen, from the album Variety (2007)
- Office of Strategic Crime Assessments, former Australian government agency, precursor to Australian Criminal Intelligence Commission

== See also ==
- Oscan language
