= Hartman v. Albright et al =

Class action lawsuit

- Court: United States District Court for the District of Columbia
- Full case name: HARTMAN, et al v. ALBRIGHT, et al
- Decided: March 24, 2000
- Defendant: Federal defendant Madeleine K. Albright et al
- Counsel for plaintiffs: Bruce Fredrickson, Susan L. Brackshaw, et al
- Plaintiffs: Carolee Brady Hartman, et al

Case history
- Prior actions: De Medina v. Reinhardt, 686 F.2d 997 (D.C. Cir. 1982) (reversing initial dismissal) Hartman v. Wick, 600 F. Supp. 361 (D.D.C. 1984) (liability finding); Hartman v. Wick, 678 F. Supp. 312 (D.D.C. 1988) (remedy framework) Hartman v. Duffey, 19 F.3d 1459 (D.C. Cir. 1994) and 88 F.3d 1232 (D.C. Cir. 1996) (class certification)
- Subsequent actions: Hartman v. Pompeo, No. 77-cv-2019, 2020 WL 6445873 (D.D.C. Nov. 3, 2020) Filing 1098 (November 3, 2020), the Court denied the Plaintiffs' motion for additional attorneys' fees.

Court membership
- Judge sitting: James Robertson

Hartman v Albright was a class action lawsuit dealing with sex discrimination at the United States Information Agency (USIA) and Voice of America. The Consent Decree of March 24, 2000, and judgement of August 14, 2000 awarded $508 million to 1,100 women, representing the largest Title VII sex discrimination class action settlement against the federal government in U.S. history, with an average recovery of $460,000 per class member.

== Background ==
The case was filed on November 25, 1977, by Carolee Brady Hartman, against the USIA under the federal-sector provision of Title VII, after a male interviewer for a USIA magazine job told her she was well-qualified but that he wanted a man for the position. Hartman sought to represent a class of women who had applied to or worked for USIA and claimed to have been harmed by the agency's discriminatory employment practices. Her case was soon consolidated with similar claims brought by other women, making around twenty more class representatives conditionally certified in April 1978.

The suit was certified as a class action by the United States District Court for the District of Columbia on February 13, 1978. The docket did not close until 47 years after it was filed.

== Procedural history ==
Multiple judges have presided over the case during its long lifespan. United States District Judge Charles R. Richey presided over the case until his death in 1997, after which the case was assigned to United States District Judge James Robertson until 2010, at which point there was no permanently-assigned presiding judge until October 16, 2019, when Amit Mehta was assigned the case.

Because USIA's director (and later the Secretary of State) were sued only in an official capacity, the case caption changed automatically every time that office changed hands. Depending on the year's opinion, the same docket (D.D.C. No. 77-cv-02019) may be cited as De Medina v. Reinhardt (686 F.2d 997 reversing initial dismissal), or as Hartman v. Wick, Hartman v. Gelb, Hartman v. Duffey, Hartman v. Albright, Hartman v. Powell, Hartman v. Pompeo, or Hartman v. Blinken — they're all the same case.

== Settlement ==
After more than two decades of litigation, and the relevant USIA functions having since been folded into the State Department, the parties finally negotiated a settlement in March 2000. The court approved the consent decree on July 12, 2000, and on August 14, 2000 entered judgement for the plaintiffs in the amount of $508,000,000.

== Limited historiographical attention ==
In the years that followed, the case was affected by a documentation gap. Although it was the largest payment ever recorded in a federal sex discrimination case, and was settled while Madeleine Albright was secretary of state, when Albright was asked about the suit in 2003, she claimed to know nothing about it, and did not mention it in her memoir.

== Aftermath ==
A handful of women who'd unsuccessfully petitioned to join the class late tried to challenge the settlement on notice grounds; the D.C. Circuit summarily affirmed approval of the decree in March 2001, and the Supreme Court denied certiorari in January 2002.

The docket did not close until 47 years after filing. In November 2020, Judge Amit Mehta denied the plaintiffs' motion for a final attorneys' fee award, finding that the lodestar method governed but that plaintiffs had not yet provided sufficiently specific calculations to support an enhancement.
