= Roger Copeland =

American film director

Roger Copeland is a former emeritus professor of theater and dance at Oberlin College where he taught History of Western Theatre among other classes. He enjoyed lecturing on the Choric Dithyramb.

== Publications ==
His essays about theater, film, and dance have appeared in The New York Times, The New Republic, The Village Voice, Film Comment, Partisan Review, and American Theatre. His books include What Is Dance? and Merce Cunningham: The Modernizing of Modern Dance.

His film Camera Obscura won the Festival Award at the Three Rivers Arts Festival in Pittsburgh in 1985. In 1989, Recorder, a video adaptation of his theater piece, "The Private Sector," was screened on WNET's Independent Focus series in New York City. The Unrecovered, a feature-length narrative film directed by Copeland, was previewed in 2005 and released in 2007.

== Controversies ==
In 2014, a sharp verbal exchange between Copeland and a student led to an investigation of his conduct as a possible violation of Title IX. The investigation was eventually dropped.

Copeland was an outspoken critic of Oberlin College during its legal dispute with Gibson's bakery.

== External references ==
- Roger Copeland at IMDb
