= John Keep =

American abolitionist (1781–1870)

Rev. John Keep
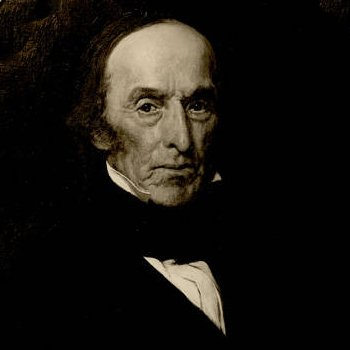
- Reverend Keep in 1859

Trustee of Oberlin College
- In office 1834–1870

Personal details
- Born: April 20, 1781 Longmeadow, Massachusetts
- Died: February 11, 1870 (aged 88) Oberlin, Ohio, United States
- Occupation: Reverend

Rev. John Keep (April 20, 1781 – February 11, 1870) was a trustee of Oberlin College from 1834 to 1870. Keep and William Dawes toured England in 1839 and 1840 gathering funds for Oberlin College in Ohio. They both attended the 1840 anti-slavery convention in London.

== Early life and career ==
Keep was born, April 20, 1781, in Longmeadow, then a precinct of Springfield, Mass. Of a family of nine children he was the seventh. He graduated from Yale College in 1802. He taught a school in Bethlehem, Connfor a year after he graduated. He read theology at the same time with pastor Rev. Dr. Azel Backus. He continued his theological studies for another year with Rev. Asahel Hooker, of Goshen, Conn., and was licensed by Litchfield North Association, June 11, 1805. The next Sunday he preached in the Congregational Church in Blandford, Mass., and immediately received an invitation to settle there, which he accepted. He remained there for 16 years. In May 1821, he moved to the Congregational Church in Homer, N. Y., and was installed November 7. In 1833 he resigned because of his sympathy with the "new measures" of revivalists. For the following year he preached in the Presbyterian Church in Cleveland, Ohio, and then organized the First Congregational Church in Ohio City (now Cleveland, West Side), and became its pastor.

== Oberlin College ==
In 1834, Keep was elected a Trustee of Oberlin College. Keep was renowned for championing the values that Oberlin College eventually became renowned for. He championed rights for women, black students and missionary zeal. Keep was the person who cast the deciding vote in 1835 that allowed black students to enter Oberlin College in Ohio.

Keep and William Dawes both undertook a fund raising mission in England in 1839 and 1840 to raise funds from sympathetic abolitionists. Oberlin College was one of the few multi-racial and co-educational colleges in America at that time. The appeal was carefully written and supported by leading American abolitionist like William Lloyd Garrison, Henry Grew, Henry Brewster Stanton and Wendell Phillips.

Many of the abolitionists mentioned in this article can be found in this painting by Benjamin Robert Haydon. Keep is obscured but was at the Anti-Slavery Convention and is credited in the key to the painting. Move your cursor to identify him or click icon to enlarge

Both Keep and Dawes are credited with helping to start the collection of African Americana at Oberlin College which inspired other writers. Keep appears in the large painting by Benjamin Robert Haydon which is on permanent display at London's National portrait gallery although he is obscured by other convention attendees. The people that Keep corresponded with, John Scoble, Joseph Sturge and George Thompson, and who welcomed them in London are clearly in the picture.

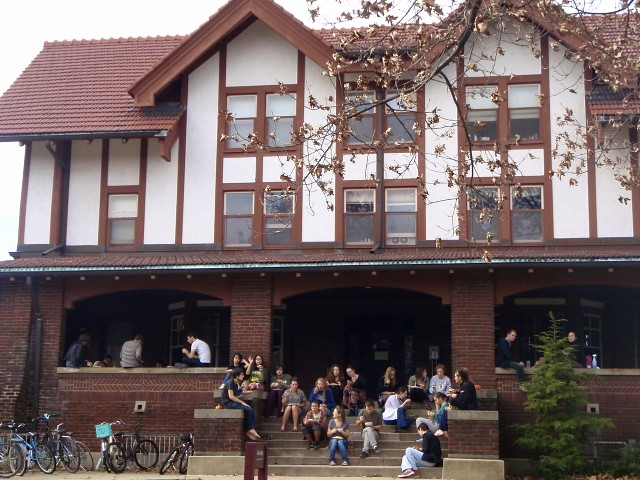
The Keep Cooperative, once the home of John Keep.

When Keep returned to Oberlin they had raised $30,000. Keep became the "father" to the girls at the college who lived at his house. One of the women who stayed with him was the sculptor Edmonia Lewis who eventually left after being falsely accused of poisoning other students with a reported aphrodisiac and of facing other accusations and racial prejudice.

Keep died there on February 11, 1870, and in 1889 the house was bought by the college. His house was used as a dormitory for female "indigent" students until it was rebuilt in 1912. The rebuilding was funded by Keep's granddaughter who commissioned Normand Patton to design Keep Cottage to sleep 80 women with room for 110 to dine. In 1966 the rules were changed to allow co-educational dormitories.
