= William Dawes (abolitionist) =

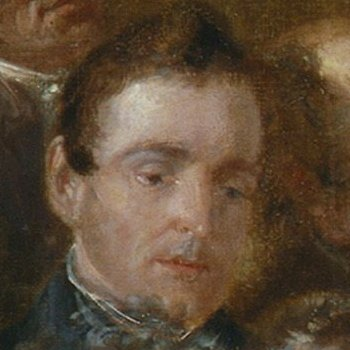
William Dawes at the 1840 convention

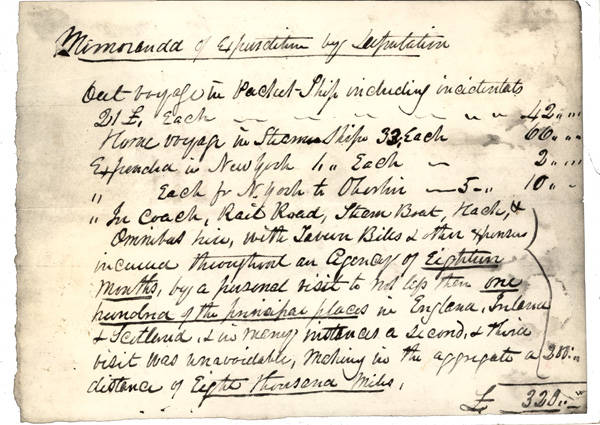
A note in William Dawes' hand itemising expenses

William Dawes was a 19th-century abolitionist who worked at Oberlin College.

== Life ==
Dawes and John Keep toured England in 1839 and 1840 gathering funds for Oberlin College in Ohio. They both attended the 1840 anti-slavery convention in London.

John Keep and William Dawes both undertook a fund raising mission in England in 1839 and 1840 to raise funds from sympathetic abolitionists. Oberlin College was one of the few multi-racial and co-educational colleges in America at that time.

Both John Keep and Dawes are credited with helping to start the collection of African Americana at Oberlin College which inspired other writers.

A house occupied by someone of the same name was in Hudson, Ohio in the 1830s supporting the route for escaping slaves.
