= Keep Cottage =

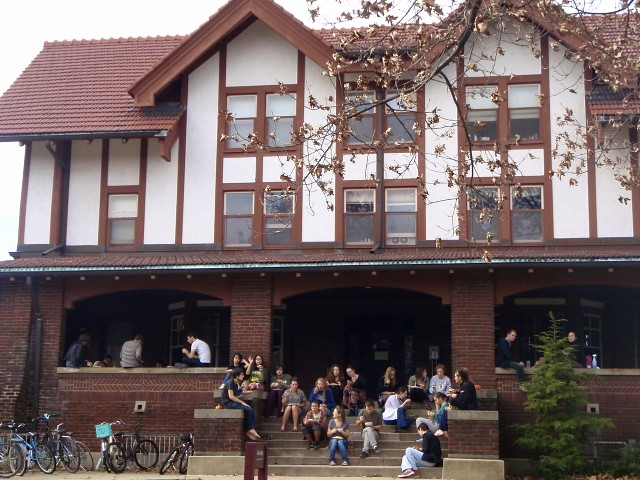

- Location within Ohio

General information
- Architectural style: Tudor Revival, Late Victorian
- Location: Oberlin, Ohio
- Coordinates: 41°17′45″N 82°13′3″W
- Completed: 1839, Renovated 1911
- Owner: Oberlin Student Cooperative Association, Oberlin College

Design and construction
- Architecture firm: Patton and Miller

Other information
- Number of rooms: 56 (Live-in Students) 77 (Dine-in Students)

Keep Cottage, also known as Keep Cooperative, is an 1839 post-Victorian Tudor Revival mansion owned and maintained by Oberlin College in Oberlin, Ohio, United States. Originally home to the Reverend John Keep, the house underwent a serious renovation in 1911 in order to transform it into a college dormitory. As of October 1965, it is a rental property of Oberlin Student Cooperative Association, the second largest student cooperative in the United States. It is named after its primary trustee, the reverend John Keep, an abolitionist who cast the deciding vote that let African-American students attend Oberlin College, the first institution to do so.

== History ==
The contract for the construction of Keep Cottage was awarded to Mr. George Feick of Sandusky in October 1911. The architect was the firm of Patton and Miller of Chicago. The cottage was opened for use in January, 1913. It has dormitory accommodations for fifty-two women. It was named in honor of Rev. John Keep and Mrs. Theodore J. Keep. Mr. George M. Clark and his wife, Mrs. Elizabeth Keep Clark, contributed $10,000 toward the cost of this cottage. The total cost, including equipment and site, was $45,500.

== OSCA ==
Keep is entirely student-run, with all participating students working as cooks, buyers, administrators, and coordinators. Most decisions within Keep are made by modified consensus. Oberlin bans all fraternities and sororities, making the co-ops the largest student-organized social system at the college. OSCA boards 630 students, the cottage houses 54 of those diners. Similar to Harkness, Keep has a tendency to serve vegetarian meals; however, meat may be purchased and served by request. Each head cook must accommodate dining members’ dietary restrictions and provide an alternative option when necessary.

The intimate and homey lounge is the primary venue for the cooperative's events, historically including the campus-wide Halloween party, the OSCA Chamber Ensemble and weekly astronomy sessions. Keep's basement is also home to the Oberlin Bike Co-op, where students can rent bicycles and also learn to fix them.

In the cooperative spirit, each member of the cooperative has an assigned, equitable task requiring some five hours of cooking, cleaning after meals, and/or one hour of house maintenance every week. The Oberlin Student Cooperative Association (OSCA) remains a nonprofit organization separate from Oberlin College and redistributes unspent room and board to its members at the end of the school year.
