= List of earliest coeducational colleges and universities in the United States =

List of mixed-sex colleges and universities in the United States

The following is a list of mixed-sex colleges and universities in the United States, listed in the order that mixed-sex students were admitted to degree-granting college-level courses.

Many of the earliest mixed-education institutes offered co-educational secondary school-level classes for three or four years before co-ed college-level courses began – these situations are noted in the parentheticals below.

== Earliest mixed-sex higher education institutes (through 19th century) ==
- Schools that were previously all-female are listed in **bold**.

| 1837 | Oberlin College (women were admitted to the "preparatory department" in 1833) |
| 1844 | Hillsdale College |
| 1845 | Franklin College (co-ed secondary-level classes began in 1842 at "Indiana Baptist Manual Labor Institute"; chartered as Franklin College in 1845) |
| 1847 | Lawrence University Otterbein University; Baylor College (until 1851 Baylor offered "coeducation" in the same building, although in separate classes; after 1851 the school fully segregated the sexes until 1887) |
| 1847 | Earlham College |
| 1849 | New-York Central College (disestablished 1860) |
| 1851 | Waynesburg College |
| 1852 | Westminster College |
| 1853 | Antioch College; Cornell College (originally Iowa Conference Seminary, co-ed classes start with founding 1853); Lawrence University (co-ed secondary classes began in 1849); Monmouth College (admits women on equal basis from beginning); Willamette University (co-ed secondary classes began in 1842) |
| 1854 | Muskingum University; Pacific University (co-ed secondary classes began in 1849); Urbana University (co-ed secondary classes began in 1850) |
| 1855 | Eureka College (admits women on an equal basis with men at its founding) Bates College; University of Iowa (first coeducational public or state university in the United States) |
| 1856 | Baldwin University (now Baldwin Wallace University) (co-ed secondary classes began in 1845); University of Evansville (formerly Moore's Hill College); St. Lawrence University; Wilberforce University (first coeducational HBCU in the United States) |
| 1857 | Alfred University (co-ed secondary classes began in 1836; it received its university charter in 1857); Hamline University (co-ed secondary classes began in 1854) |
| 1858 | University of Mount Union (co-ed classes began in 1846; chartered as college in 1858) |
| 1859 | Adrian College (four women enrolled as early as 1855 when Michigan Union College; Adrian itself was open to women from the onset under equal curriculum) Cooper Union (free college; enrollment open to all genders, races, religions, economic classes); Olivet College (co-ed secondary classes began in 1844; chartered as college in 1859) |
| 1860 | Wheaton College (Illinois) |
| 1861 | Plainfield CollegeGrinnell College |
| 1862 | Baker University (co-ed secondary classes began in 1858) |
| 1863 | Kansas State University |
| 1864 | Swarthmore College; Blackburn College |
| 1866 | University of Wisconsin–Madison (women admitted to classes in the "Normal Department" in 1863 and all college classes about 1866, although separate Female College and separate graduation existed until 1874) |
| 1867 | Carleton College; DePauw University; **East Tennessee Wesleyan University** (now Tennessee Wesleyan University; formerly Athens Female College); Hiram College (co-ed secondary classes began in 1850); Indiana University; Lebanon Valley College; McDaniel College |
| 1868 | University of Missouri; Oregon State University (co-ed secondary classes began about 1858; chartered as college in 1868) Wells College (Coeducational in 2005) University of Minnesota |
| 1869 | Berea College; Boston University; Iowa State University; University of Kansas (co-ed secondary classes began in 1866); Northwestern University; Ohio University; Washington University in St. Louis |
| 1870 | Allegheny College University of the Pacific (United States) (co-ed secondary classes began in 1852); University of California, Berkeley; Carthage College; Cornell University; University of Illinois; University of Iowa Medical School; Knox College; Michigan State University; College of Wooster |
| 1871 | Colby College (until 1890, when women were resegregated into separate classes); University of Michigan; University of Nebraska–Lincoln; Pennsylvania State University; Syracuse University; University of Vermont |
| 1872 | Tusculum College; University of Akron (at that time "Buchtel College"); University of Maine; University of Washington (co-ed secondary classes began in 1861; the school was closed at various times between 1862 and 1869); Wesleyan University (until 1912, when it became all male once again) |
| 1873 | North Georgia Agricultural College, subsequently North Georgia College & State University; since 2013 merged into the University of North Georgia); Ohio State University; Susquehanna University; Texas Christian University |
| 1875 | Purdue University; St. Olaf College |
| 1876 | University of OregonUniversity of Rio Grande |
| 1877 | University of Colorado at Boulder; Ohio Wesleyan University |
| 1878 | Hope College |
| 1880 | Bridgewater College (the first private liberal arts college in Virginia to be co-ed, and one of the first of its kind in the south); Emerson College; University of Pennsylvania (women previously admitted to non-degree-granting programs in 1876); University of Southern California; Ursinus College |
| 1881 | Coe College; Hendrix College |
| 1882 | University of South Dakota |
| 1883 | Bucknell University; Florida State University (The school was a coeducational seminary beginning in 1851, and was chartered as a coeducational university in 1883. However, in 1905, a reorganization of the state's higher education system converted what was then Florida State College to a women's school, Florida State College for Women. It returned to coeducation in 1947, adopting its current name at that time.); Middlebury College; University of Texas |
| 1884 | University of North Dakota |
| 1885 | University of Mississippi |
| 1886 | University of Nevada, Reno |
| 1887 | Baylor University; Gallaudet University (at the time "National Deaf-Mute College); Occidental College; Pomona College; Stetson University (co-ed secondary classes began in 1883); University of Wyoming |
| 1888 | George Washington University; Guilford College (co-ed secondary classes began in 1837; it became a college in 1888); University of Kentucky; Tulane University Pharmaceutical School |
| 1889 | Elon University; West Virginia University |
| 1891 | University of Arizona; George Fox University (at the time "Pacific College"); College of Idaho; Stanford University |
| 1892 | Auburn University; Greenville University; University of Chicago (women resegregated into separate classes in 1902 for their first two years); University of New Mexico; University of OklahomaAmerican International College |
| 1893 | University of Alabama; University of Connecticut; Johns Hopkins University Graduate School; Macalester College; University of Tennessee |
| 1894 | Boalt Hall |
| 1895 | Beloit College; University of Montana; University of Pittsburgh; University of South Carolina |
| 1897 | University at Buffalo Law School; University of North Carolina at Chapel Hill (graduate students) |
| 1899 | Eastern Michigan University (co-ed classes in the "Normal school" began 1852; chartered as college in 1899) |
