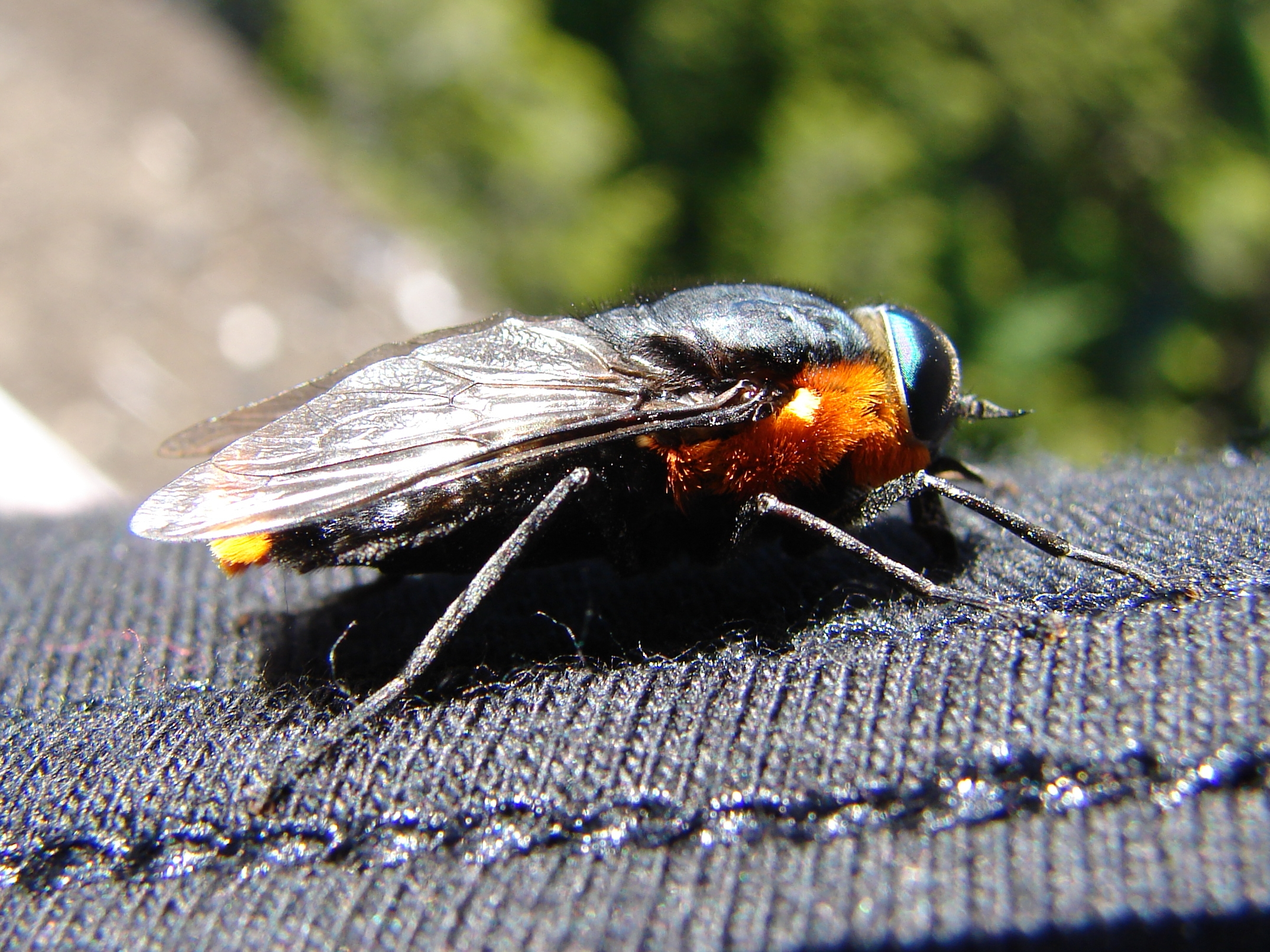

Scientific classification
- Kingdom: Animalia
- Phylum: Arthropoda
- Class: Insecta
- Order: Diptera
- Family: Tabanidae
- Subfamily: Pangoniinae
- Tribe: Scionini
- Genus: Osca
- Species: O. lata

Binomial name
- Osca lata (Guérin-Méneville, 1835)

Synonyms
- Tabanus lata Guérin-Méneville, 1835; Scaptia lata (Guérin-Méneville, 1835); Osca depressa Macquart, 1838; Osca faceta Enderlein, 1925

= Osca lata =

Species of fly

Osca lata, the coliguacho, tábano or black horse fly, is a large horse fly whose range includes southern Chile and southern Argentina. Previously known as Scaptia lata, it has a striking reddish-orange coloration on the side of its thorax and abdomen. It is generally around 2 cm. in adult size.

Like most species of horse flies, the females of Osca lata need to feed on mammalian blood before they can produce eggs.
