= The Oberlin Review =

Student newspaper at Oberlin College

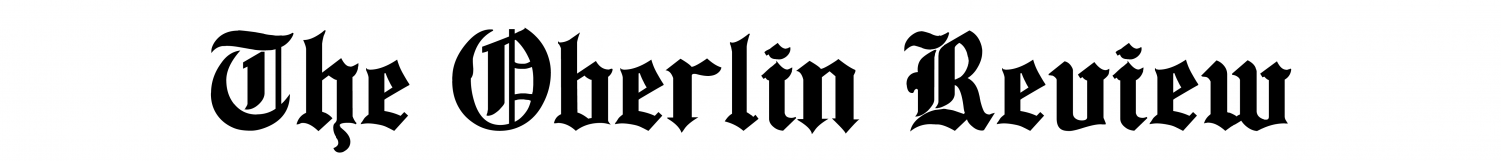
- Type: Student newspaper
- School: Oberlin College
- Founded: 1874
- City: Oberlin, Ohio
- Circulation: 1,700 (as of 2016)
- Website: oberlinreview.org

The Oberlin Review is a student-run weekly newspaper at Oberlin College that serves as the official newspaper of record for both the College and the city of Oberlin, Ohio.

The publication became the only newspaper of record for Oberlin after the Oberlin News-Tribune closed in 2018.

== Overview ==
The newspaper was first published in 1874, making it one of the oldest college newspapers in the nation. The tabloid-sized newspaper, with a circulation of 1,700, is published roughly 25 times during the academic year from its office in the basement of Burton Hall. It is printed by PM Graphics.

The newspaper's format has remained relatively constant despite rapid turnover in staffing. Its 16 pages are currently divided into five sections: News, Opinions, This Week in Oberlin, Arts and Sports. Past semesters have also included a Features section. In 2008, editors introduced a color front page, back page and centerfold.

== Awards ==
The Review has won numerous awards from the Columbia Scholastic Press Association. From 1994 to 1996, it won the Collegiate Silver Crown awarded by that organization.
