= Neil Zurcher =

American television reporter (1935–2025)

- Born: November 12, 1935; Henrietta, Ohio, U.S.
- Died: January 8, 2025 (aged 89)
- Occupations: Television reporter, author

Neil Zurcher (November 12, 1935 – January 8, 2025) was an American television reporter for Fox-TV affiliate WJW-TV Channel 8 in Cleveland, Ohio. He was best known for his travel segment One Tank Trips.

== Background ==
Zurcher was born on November 12, 1935, in Henrietta, Ohio, near Oberlin. Zurcher joined the Marines and after being honorably discharged in 1954, began working as a reporter for the Oberlin News-Tribune. Seven years later Zurcher made the switch from print to broadcasting when he became a reporter for WEOL radio in Elyria, OH. During his time at the station he purchased a 16mm motion picture camera and began filming many of the stories he reported and sold the footage to WJW-TV in Cleveland. Zurcher became a full-time television reporter for WJW in 1967. He covered some of his biggest regional stories during the 1960s including the Palm Sunday tornado of 1965, the Kent State Vietnam War protests, and the 1968 Ohio Pen Riot. WJW observed Zurcher's retirement on November 22, 2016, which coincided with WJW meteorologist Dick Goddard's retirement.

== One Tank Trips ==
During the oil crisis of 1979 WJW created a temporary travel segment for the news. The series was hosted by Zurcher and was called "One Tank Trips." The segment was so popular with Northeast Ohio audiences that it was extended for several months and then later became a regular part of the program for the next 25 years. One Tank Trips consisted of traveling destinations that Northeast Ohioans could visit on a single tank of gas. During his decades of travels, Zurcher drove more than million miles. Zurcher retired in 2004 but was asked to resume his One Tank Trips segment on the WJW show New Day Cleveland in 2012. Zurcher retired again in 2016. As of July 2020 the One Tank Trips segment continues as part of New Day Cleveland with the show's hosts replacing Zurcher.

== Author ==
In 1995, Gray & Company Publishers published the book One Tank Trips based on the recurring news segment. The book featured travel destinations in and around Ohio as well as stories from Zurcher's years on the road. Zurcher later authored several other books on Ohio travel and history such as Ohio Road Trips, Ohio Oddities, and Strange Tales from Ohio. In 2010 Gray & Company published his memoir Tales from the Road.

== Awards, honors and accomplishments ==
Zurcher received the Distinguished Service award from the Society of Professional Journalism and the Silver Circle award from the National Academy of Television Arts and Sciences. He also received an Emmy, the Award for Excellence in Broadcasting from the Cleveland Association of Broadcasters, and has been inducted into the Cleveland Press Club Hall of Fame. He was also inducted into the Ohio Broadcasters Hall of Fame and received their "Living Legacy" award in 2007.

== Death ==
Zurcher died on January 8, 2025, at the age of 89.

== Selected bibliography ==
- Ten Ohio Disasters (2022: ISBN 978-1-59851-126-0)
- Tales from the Road (2009: ISBN 978-1-59851-064-5)
- Ohio Road Trips (2009: ISBN 978-1-59851-057-7)
- Ohio Oddities (2008: ISBN 978-1-59851-047-8)
- Strange Tales from Ohio (2008: ISBN 978-1-59851-048-5)

== Sources ==
- Crump, Sara (2010-06-20). "Cleveland TV legend Neil Zurcher hits the highway with new memoir, 'Tales From the Road" The Plain Dealer. Retrieved 2010-07-01
- Zurcher, Neil (2010). Tales from the Road. Cleveland, OH: Gray & Company, Publishers. ISBN 978-1-59851-064-5
- "About Neil Zurcher" Gray & Company website.
