= Oberlin Student Cooperative Association =

Nonprofit organization in Ohio, US

Oberlin Student Cooperative Association (OSCA)
- Founded: 1952, Incorporated 1962
- Type: Housing cooperative, Food cooperative
- Purpose: Affordable student dining and housing, sustainability
- Location: Oberlin, Ohio, United States
- Key people: Theo Sloan, President; Bea Becker, Membership Secretary; Roman Lafia, Treasurer; Alex Sanandaji, Chair of the Board; Linda Doan, Financial Manager; Arlene Muir, Office Assistant
- Website: www.osca.coop

The Oberlin Student Cooperative Association (OSCA) is a non-profit corporation founded in 1962 that feeds and houses Oberlin College students. Located in the town of Oberlin, Ohio, it is independent from but closely tied to Oberlin College. OSCA is one of the largest student housing cooperatives in North America.

== History ==
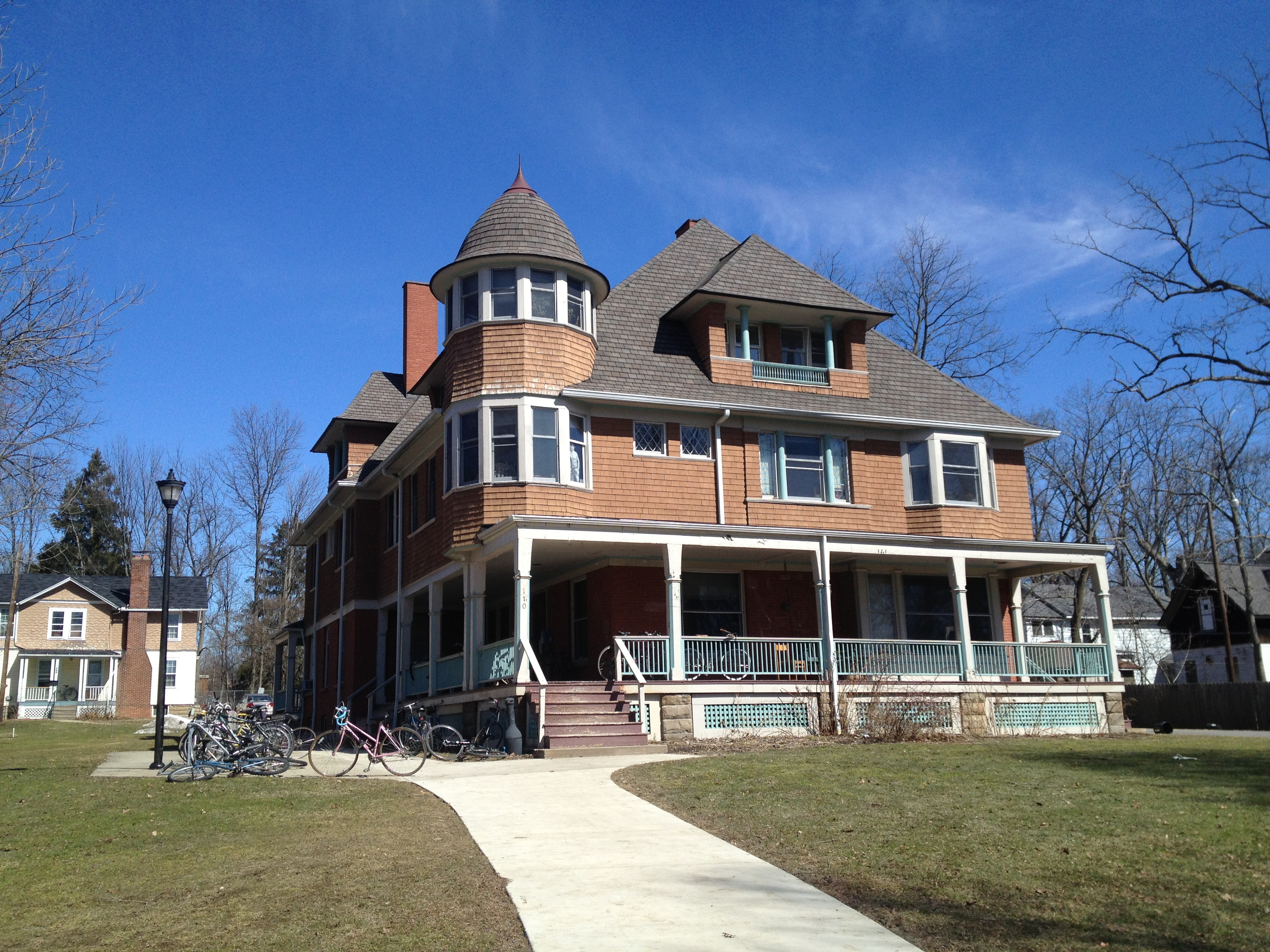
Tank Cooperative, one of OSCA's housing co-ops

The first Oberlin co-op, Pyle Inn, opened in 1930 but due to poor funding existed only intermittently. By 1949, however, students dissatisfied with the college's dining system chose to revive the cooperative food system. The Inter-Cooperative Council (ICC) was founded in conjunction between Kyle and the newly opened Grey Gables, with a mission to serve as an educational and social committee. By 1962, with the inception of Keep, the ICC became the Oberlin Student Cooperative Association, the largest student-run cooperative in American history.

OSCA flourished for another twenty years, but underwent a critical financial crisis in 1982. OSCA was audited by the IRS and nearly lost its tax-exempt status. This setback caused a rift in the community and instigated the start of several major changes to the cooperative structure. One of the most important changes was OSCA hiring a Financial Manager.

By 1989, the organization committed to practices of sustainability and environmentalism, purchasing local foods and cooking with more environmentally-friendly practices. In the spring of 2002, OSCA created the institution of COPAO, the Committee on Privilege and Oppression, which explores racial and socio-economic inequality within the cooperative system. This has evolved over time into OSCA's current bi-yearly Privilege & Oppression Workshop series, where OSCA members are invited to hold workshops on different aspects of OSCA in order to educate membership on the roles of privilege and oppression within the organization. OSCA members are required to attend or lead at least one workshop every semester.

During the COVID Pandemic in 2020, Oberlin College and OSCA negotiated a new rent contract, more officially splitting the two entities. The contract greatly increased the amount of rent OSCA pays for the use of its buildings while removing many services and supports that Oberlin College had previously offered OSCA. This has led to a shift in OSCA's reputation on campus, as the organization is now much more expensive and offers less comprehensive services than other campus options. This, along with declining membership and inflation, has led to tensions within OSCA in the last few years, especially as recent leadership teams have deteriorated relationships with Oberlin College.

== Operations ==
OSCA pays rent to Oberlin College for use of its buildings, but otherwise operates autonomously. OSCA collects its own tuition, manages its own finances, organizes its own members, buys directly from local farms, and manages its operations without Oberlin College intervention. Largely, the organization is run by its member-owners. For large decisions that affect all OSCA co-ops, student members vote by OSCA's consensus process on all rules and implement decisions. This process also occurs at the level of the individual co-op.

OSCA members fill all positions within the co-ops, such as president, Sexual Harm Information Liaisons (SHILs), Accessibility Committee Coordinators (AccessCos), and head cooks. Members of OSCA do all of the cooking, cleaning, food buying, baking, and other tasks within their individual co-ops. Members can also work for money and/or hours in elected or hired positions such as Board Rep, Cleanliness & Maintenance Coordinator, or Accessibility Committee Coordinator. Each co-op decides at the beginning of each semester how much time members must contribute. For those who hold jobs outside of the co-op, most co-ops will offer "time aid" to significantly reduce the number of co-op hours required. Every member of OSCA must clean up after one meal a week.

The organization also employs one full-time Employee, a Financial Manager, and one part-time Office Assistant.

Every fall, OSCA members vote for the corporation's officers for the next year, including OSCA President, Treasurer, Chair of the Board, and Membership Director (Secretary). These officers, along with other student staff and adult employees, make up the General Management Team, or the GMT. The GMT deals with the overall operations of the co-ops, but generally does not involve itself in minute decisions. In addition to this operational management, OSCA's policies and protocols are managed by the Board of Directors. This Board is made up of two representatives from every co-op as well as the chair of the board.

There are no meal cards or cafeteria trays in co-ops. Communal meals are prepared for lunch at 12:20 pm and dinner at 6:20 pm, and the kitchens are open 24/7. Guest policies are set by members so they can bring friends and professors to meals. Many co-ops are vegetarian and vegan-friendly, and allergy awareness among the membership is always a priority. Mealtime is often spent discussing co-op related issues, ranging from electing head cooks to determining health and safety policies for the co-op at large.

== Principles ==
The principles which guide modern cooperative organizations including OSCA were formulated in 1844 by a group of textile workers in Rochdale, England who were fed up with the exploitative nature of the market during the British Industrial Revolution. They decided to pool their money and open a small retail store which operated on principles which have become the foundation of modern co-ops. The principles laid down by the Rochdale Society of Equitable Pioneers have since been adapted to fit the modern cooperative context. In 1995, the International Cooperative Alliance adopted a revised list of the cooperative principles, which OSCA uses today in a modified form. In 2014, the membership ratified substantial changes to the cooperative principles.

== Jobs ==
=== All-OSCA Staff ===
All members of OSCA equally own and participate in running OSCA. However, there are certain individual leadership roles that function on an all-OSCA level (rather than on an individual co-op level) in order to allow OSCA to function as the large organization that it is. These jobs include four Officer positions and a number of All-OSCA student staff positions. Students in these roles oversee different aspects of OSCA. While in the past most positions were elected annually, OSCA has transitioned to hiring for most All-OSCA roles. Examples include Housing Loose End Coordinators, the OSCA-Oberlin College Liaison, Dining and Housing Operations Managers, and various committee coordinators.

=== Individual Co-op Positions ===
Each co-op also employs many of its members in specific positions; work performed in these positions counts towards a student's hours within their co-op. These roles exist distinctly within housing and dining co-ops, and one student may hold both a housing and dining co-op job to fulfill their required hours. Examples in dining include Tasty Things Makers, Bread Makers, Kitchen Coordinators, and Food Buyers. Examples in housing include Cleanliness Coordinators, Garden Coordinators, and Supply Coordinators.

== Facilities ==
OSCA operates four co-ops with housing and dining facilities: Keep, Tank, Harkness and Third World Co-op/Third World Social-Justice Co-op. It also has one dining-only co-op, Pyle Inn Co-op. All of these co-ops are located inside of Oberlin College-owned buildings.

=== Harkness Co-op ===
Harkness opened in 1950 as a women's dorm, and in September 1967, it became the fourth Oberlin housing and dining co-op. Harkness was the first Oberlin co-op to use consensus (starting in 1979) a decision process that soon spread throughout OSCA. Also in 1979, Harkness created the Contraceptive Co-op, which eventually transformed into today's Sexual Information Center at Oberlin. For many years, Harkness was also home to the Good Food Co-op, a consumer cooperative that was run and used by both Oberlin College students and Oberlin community members. Harkness traditions include hosting a Jellyfish Parade during every full moon and operating the large basement dining room as a dance club. Its mascot, a colorful shark -- often stolen and sometimes repainted by pranking members of other co-ops -- hangs in the main stairway, and lends the moniker "sharks" to Hark's membership.

=== TWC/TWSJ ===
Third World Social Justice Co-op (TWSJ), which is also housed in a section of Harkness, provides safe-space housing for BIPOC Oberlin Students and OSCA members. It is closely related to the Third World Co-op (TWC), which provides safe-space dining for the same groups. They are often seen as the housing and dining parts of one larger Third-World Co-op. Unlike other housing and dining co-ops, though, TWSJ and TWC are housed in separate buildings. Baldwin House, one of Oberlin College's women and trans* houses situated on the opposite side of Harkness Bowl, houses the TWC kitchen. OSCA has been dealing with reports of internal racism against members of TWC/TWSJ for years, and a Racism in OSCA panel has become a staple of the Privilege & Oppression Workshops the organization holds every semester.

=== Tank Co-op ===
Tank is OSCA's second-largest co-op, located a quarter mile east of any other building on Oberlin's Campus. Tank traditions include the annual Pig Roast. Tank is currently home to the OSCA office, which is where daily operations to maintain the OSCA system are done by student and adult staff members. While many OSCA co-ops have a certain image within the Oberlin community, none is more solidified than Tank's as a cat house.

=== Keep Co-op ===
Housed in a Tudor-style building just north of Tappan Square, Keep Co-op is one of OSCA's oldest. The co-op is famous for eating on its large porch and steps in all weather and seasons. There is some debate as to whether Keep or Harkness first began the tradition of Friday Night Pizza, but the tradition has persisted in Keep as well as in Harkness. Keep is also home to the Bike Co-op, an independently run co-operative providing bike maintenance to Oberlin College students. (Members of the Bike Co-op can also learn how to build their own bicycles, and are encouraged to keep what they build after a certain amount of labor has been committed. Though separate from OSCA, it operates on many the same principles.)

=== Pyle Inn ===
OSCA's oldest co-op, Pyle Inn has been operating continuously for over 70 years. While it was originally housed in its own building on West College street, it has since moved a few times, resulting in its current location in Asia House. Located just next to the Free Store, Pyle's kitchen is in the basement and its dining room is upstairs. The co-op houses a dumbwaiter, the only OSCA co-op to do so.

== Former Facilities ==
=== Fairchild Co-op ===
Fairchild, known on campus and by its members as "Fairkid", was a dining-only co-op that opened in 1977 in the basement of Fairchild Hall. Initially, student survey determined that students were interested in a healthier dining option, so Fairchild opened as an "all-natural" co-op. Overtime, it eventually became a vegan co-op. Until Spring of 2017, the co-op shared its space with Brown Bag Co-op, a grocery-store style co-op for students living in village or off-campus housing. Fairchild Co-op was closed during the COVID Pandemic. In its space, Oberlin College operated Clarity Dining Hall, an allergen-free kitchen, though the dining and kitchen space has been vacant since fall 2025.

=== Old Barrows ===
Old Barrows, also known as Old B, was one of the earliest co-ops on Oberlin College's campus. Originally founded as a housing-only co-op, Old B eventually expanded and became the home of Brown Bag Co-op, a grocery-style co-op. Old Barrows, similarly to Third World Co-op/Third World Social Justice Co-op, was operated as an identity-based housing co-op for women and trans people. Though OSCA has not rented Old B since the end of the pandemic, Oberlin College still operates the building as a women and trans* dorm through its identity-based housing program.

=== Talcott Hall ===
Talcott Hall was the home of Kosher-Halal Co-op. Through its intermittent relationship with KHC, OSCA occasionally operated the building's kitchen.

== See also ==
- List of food cooperatives
