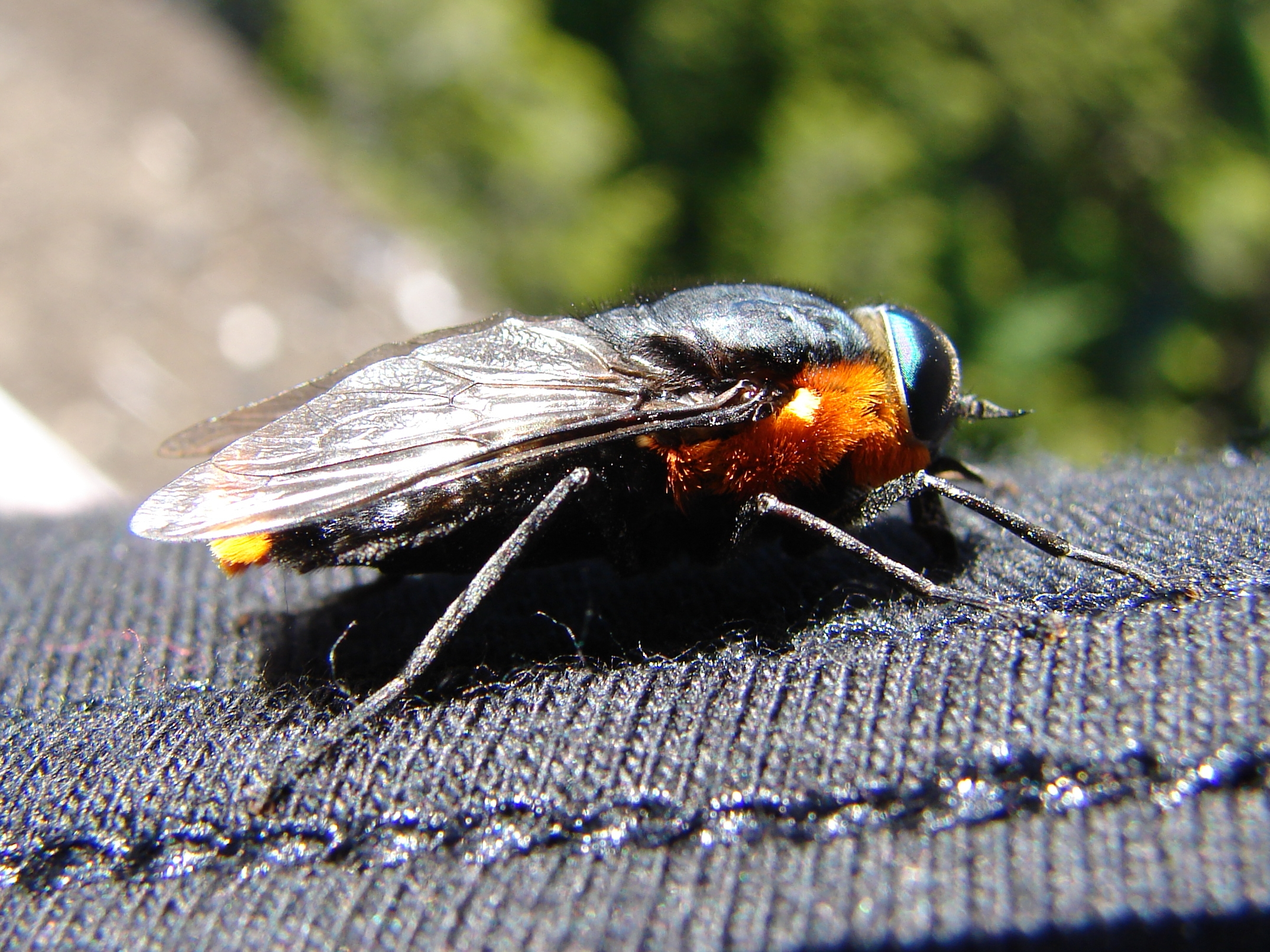
- Scaptia lata

Scientific classification
- Kingdom: Animalia
- Phylum: Arthropoda
- Class: Insecta
- Order: Diptera
- Family: Tabanidae
- Subfamily: Pangoniinae
- Tribe: Scionini
- Genus: Osca; Walker, 1850)

Type species
- Osca depressa Macquart, 1838

Synonyms
- Bombomimetes Enderlein, 1922; Calliosca Enderlein, 1925

= Osca (fly) =

Genus of flies

Osca is a genus of horse-flies in the tribe Scionini.

== Species ==
- Osca abdominosa (Philip, 1968)
- Osca albithorax (Macquart, 1838)
- Osca aureonigra Kröber, 1931
- Osca aureopygia (Philip, 1968)
- Osca collaris (Philippi, 1865)
- Osca lata (Guerin, 1835)
- Osca nigribella (Wilkerson, 1984)
- Osca rubriventris Kröber, 1930
- Osca rufa (Macquart, 1838)
- Osca sublata (Philip, 1968)
- Osca varia (Walker, 1848)
