= Oberlin College =

Private college in Oberlin, Ohio, US

- Former names: Oberlin Collegiate Institute (1833–1864)
- Motto: Learning and Labor
- Type: Private liberal arts college
- Established: December 3, 1833; 192 years ago
- Academic affiliations: Annapolis Group; CIC; CLAC; COFHE; Five Colleges of Ohio; GLCA; NAICU; Oberlin Group
- Endowment: $1.48 billion (2025)
- President: Carmen Twillie Ambar
- Faculty: 327 (2017)
- Students: 3,067 (2026)
- Location: Oberlin, Ohio, U.S. 41°17′35″N 82°13′18″W
- Campus: Suburban
- Colors: Red & gold
- Nickname: Yeomen / Yeowomen
- Sporting affiliations: NCAA Division III – NCAC
- Mascot: Yeobie the Squirrel
- Website: oberlin.edu

Oberlin College is a private liberal arts college and conservatory of music in Oberlin, Ohio, United States. Founded as the Oberlin Collegiate Institute in 1833, it is the oldest coeducational liberal arts college in the United States and the second-oldest continuously operating coeducational institute of higher learning in the world. The Oberlin Conservatory of Music is the oldest continuously operating conservatory in the United States.

In 1835, Oberlin became one of the first colleges in the United States to admit African Americans, and in 1837, the first to admit women (other than Franklin College's brief experiment of 1787–89). It has been known since its founding for progressive student activism.

The College of Arts & Sciences offers more than 60 majors, minors, and concentrations. Oberlin is a member of the Great Lakes Colleges Association and the Five Colleges of Ohio consortium.

== History ==
The Oberlin Collegiate Institute (name changed later to Oberlin College in 1850) was founded in 1833. The college's founders wrote voluminously and were featured prominently in the press, especially the abolitionist newspaper The Liberator, in which the name Oberlin occurred 352 times by 1865. Original documents and correspondence survive and are readily available. There is a "wealth of primary documents and scholarly works". Robert Samuel Fletcher (class of 1920) published an important history in 1943. His disciple Geoffrey Blodgett (1953) continued Fletcher's work.

=== Founding ===
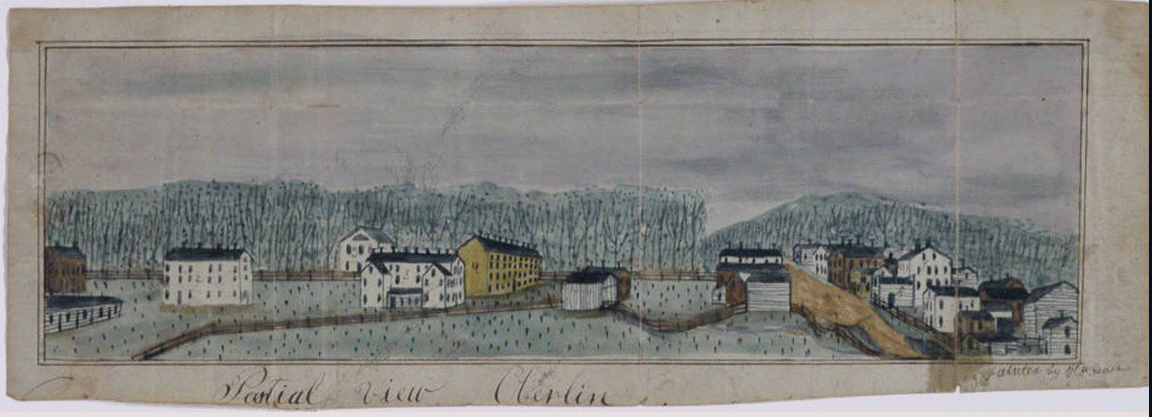
Partial View Oberlin by H. Alonzo Pease, 1838

Oberlin began inspired by a wave of Christian revivals in western New York State, in which Charles Finney was very much involved. Oberlin founder John Jay Shipherd was an admirer of Finney, and visited him in Rochester, New York, when en route to Ohio for the first time. Finney invited Shipherd to stay with him as an assistant, but Shipherd "felt that he had his own important part to play in bringing on the millennium, God's triumphant reign on Earth. Finney's desires were one thing, but Shipherd believed that the Lord's work for him lay farther west." Shipherd attempted to convince Finney to accompany him west, which he did in 1835.

The Oberlin Collegiate Institute was founded in 1833 by Shipherd and another Presbyterian minister, Philo Stewart, "formerly a missionary among the Cherokees in Mississippi, and at that time residing in Mr. Shipherd's family," who was studying Divinity with Shipherd. The institute was built on 500 acres (2 km^{2}) of land donated by Titus Street, founder of Streetsboro, Ohio, and Samuel Hughes, who lived in Connecticut.

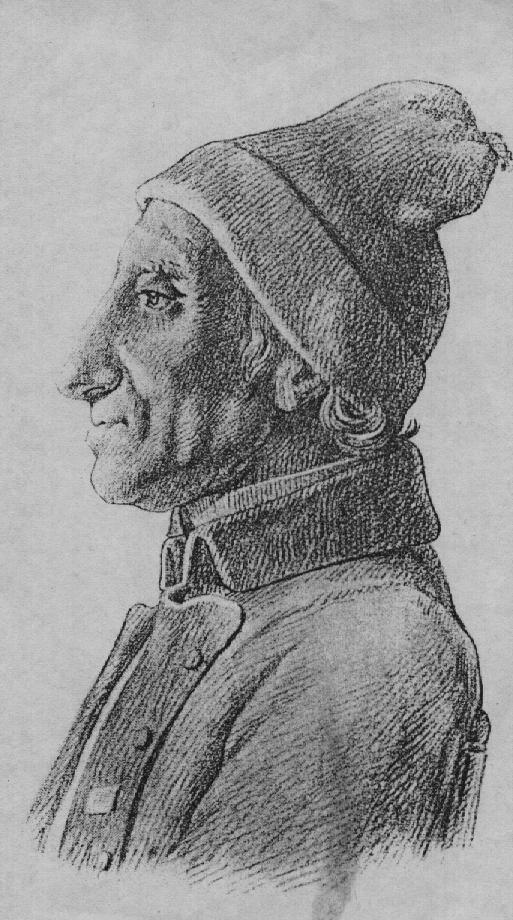
The college was named after a prominent minister, Jean-Frédéric Oberlin

Shipherd and Stewert named their project after Alsatian minister Jean-Frédéric Oberlin, about whom a book had just been published, which Stewart was reading to Shipherd. Oberlin had brought social Christianity to an isolated region of France, just as they hoped to bring to the remote Western Reserve region of northeastern Ohio.

Their vision was:

A community of Christian families with a Christian school which should be "a center of religious influence and power which should work mightily upon the surrounding country and the world—a sort of missionary institution for training laborers for the work abroad"—the school to be conducted on the manual labor system, and to be open to both young men and young women. It was not proposed to establish a college but simply an academy for instruction in English and useful languages; and, if providence should favor it, in "practical Theology". In accordance with this plan the corporate name, "Oberlin College Institute"[,] was chosen.

Oberlin was very much a part of the Utopian perfectionist enthusiasm that swept the country in the 1830s. "Shipherd came close to being a Christian communist, and as he traveled about the country signing up recruits for the Oberlin colony, he carried with him a copy of the Oberlin covenant, which each colonist was required to sign."

The Oberlin covenant is a fascinating document. It has strong communal overtones, though, in the end, private property is allowed. It is very keen on plain, straight living—no smoking, no chewing [tobacco], no coffee or tea; jewelry and tight dresses are explicitly renounced, as are fancy houses, furniture, and carriages. But the main thrust of the covenant is clearly toward missionary education to save a perishing world.

The terms of the Oberlin covenant, as summarized by Shipherd, were:

Each member of the colony shall consider himself a steward of the Lord, & hold only so much property as he can advantageously manage for the Lord. Everyone, regardless of worldly maxims, shall return to Gospel simplicity of dress, diet, houses, and furniture, all appertaining to him, & be industrious & economical with the view of earning & saving as much as possible, not to hoard up for old age, & for children, but to glorify God in the salvation of men: And that no one need to be tempted to hoard up, the colonists (as members of one body, of which Christ is the head), mutually pledge that they will provide in all respects for the widowed, orphan, & all the needy as well as for themselves & households.

=== Predecessor: The Oneida Institute ===
With the noble exception of the Oneida Institute in the state of New York, which, in the midst of persecution, has stood erect and preeminently true to the slave, mighty in its free testimony, and terrible to the oppressor, the Institution of Oberlin is the only one in the United States in which the black and colored student finds a home, where he is fully and joyously regarded as a man and a brother.

The Lane Rebels are commonly mentioned in the early history of Oberlin. These original Oberlin students, who had little to do with Lane other than walking out on it, were carrying on a tradition that began at the Oneida Institute of Science and Industry, in Oneida County, New York, near Utica. Oneida was "a hotbed of anti-slavery activity", "abolitionist to the core, more so than any other American college." A fundraising trip to England sought funds for both colleges. Oberlin's anti-slavery activities supplanted those of Oneida, which fell on hard times and closed in 1843. Funding previously provided by the philanthropist brothers Lewis and Arthur Tappan was transferred to Oberlin. Oberlin became the new "academic powder keg for abolitionism."

Oneida was founded by George Washington Gale, of whom Oberlin President Charles Grandison Finney was a disciple. The institute's second and final President, Beriah Green, moved to Oneida after he proved too abolitionist for Western Reserve College, Oberlin's early competitor in the Ohio Western Reserve.

=== The Lane Rebels enroll at Oberlin ===
The historian Roland Baumann described the early situation:

When the Oberlin Collegiate Institute was formed in 1833 the founders did not anticipate including black Americans in the student body. Additionally, the slavery question did not play any part in the college's or colony's establishment. Such matters arose only when Oberlin's trustees agreed to admit the Lane Seminary Rebels from Cincinnati to Oberlin. The Lane Rebels collectively demanded that students at the seminary have the right to freely debate antislavery issues, and that the seminary's faculty members manage the affairs of the institution.

The charismatic Theodore Dwight Weld, after three years (1827–1830) studying with Gale at Oneida, was hired by the new Society for Promoting Manual Labor in Literary Institutions, a project of the Tappans. (By "literary institutions" what is meant is non-religious schools, as in "In every literary institution there are a number of hours daily, in which nothing is required of the student.") He was charged with finding a site for "a great national manual labor institution where training for the Western ministry could be provided for poor but earnest young men who had dedicated their lives to the home missionary cause in the vast valley of the Mississippi." By coincidence, the administrators of new and barely-functioning Lane Seminary, a manual labor school located just outside Cincinnati, were looking for students. Weld visited Cincinnati in 1832, determined that the school would do, got the approval of the Tappans, and by providing recommendations to them took over as de facto head of the Seminary, to the point of choosing the president (Lyman Beecher, after Finney turned it down) and telling the trustees whom to hire. He organized and led a group exodus of Oneida students, and others from upstate New York, to come to Lane. "Lane was Oneida moved west."

This coincided with the emergence of "immediatism": the call for immediate and uncompensated freeing of all slaves, which at the time was a radical idea, and the rejection of "colonization", sending freed slaves to Africa by the American Colonization Society. "The anti-slavery and the colonization questions had become exciting ones throughout the whole country, and the students deemed it to be their duty thoroughly to examine them, in view of their bearing upon their future responsibilities as ministers of the gospel." Shortly after their arrival at Lane, the Oneida contingent held a lengthy, well-publicized series of debates, over 18 days during February 1834, on the topic of abolition versus colonization, concluding with the endorsement of the former and rejection of the latter. (Although announced as debate, no one spoke in favor of colonization on any of the evenings.) The trustees and administrators of Lane, fearful of violence like the Cincinnati riots of 1829, prohibited off-topic discussions, even at meals. The Lane Rebels, including almost all of Lane's theological students, among them the entire Oneida contingent, resigned en masse in December, and published a pamphlet explaining their decision. A trustee, Asa Mahan, resigned also, and the trustees fired John Morgan, a faculty member who supported the students.

A chance encounter with Shipherd, who was travelling around Ohio recruiting students for his new Collegiate Institute, led to the proposal that they come to Oberlin, along with Mahan and the fired Lane professor. They did so, but only after Oberlin agreed to their conditions:

- Oberlin, like Oneida, would admit African Americans on an equal basis. At the time, this was a radical and unpopular measure, even dangerous. Previous attempts at "racially" integrated schools, the Noyes Academy and the Canterbury Female Boarding School, had been met with violence that destroyed both schools. Refugees from both had enrolled at Oneida. No one was calling for racially integrated schools, except at Oneida.

This measure caused the trustees "a great struggle to overcome their prejudices". Moving their meeting to Elyria on January 1, 1835, at the Temperance House instead of Oberlin, so as to avoid a hostile and possibly disruptive audience, the trustees agreed to hire Mahan and Morgan, but took no action on the black question. They tabled it, until it was made clear that if they did not agree, they would lose the Tappans' money, the cadre of students, Mahan, Finney, and Shipherd himself, who threatened to quit and set forth at length the reasons Oberlin should educate blacks. The Trustees, meeting on February 9 in Shipherd's house, reexamined the question, and it passed after Trustee Chairman John Keep broke a 3–3 tie vote.

- There would be no restrictions on discussion of slavery or any other topic.
- Asa Mahan, the Lane trustee who resigned with the students, would become president. This initiative came from the Oneida students, and Weld in particular.
- Professor John Morgan, fired by Lane for supporting the students, would be hired also.
- Under what Fletcher labeled the "Finney compact", in sharp contrast with and in reaction to recent events at Lane, the internal affairs of the college were to be under faculty control, "much to the irritation of our latter-day trustees, and occasionally our presidents and deans". This commitment to academic freedom was a key innovation in American higher education.

"In the summer of 1835, they all arrived in Oberlin—President Mahan, Father Finney, Professor Morgan, the Lane rebels, the first black students, and the Tappans' money." The Oberlin Anti-Slavery Society, calling for "immediate emancipation", was founded in June 1835. The names of Shipherd, Mahan, and Finney are first on its founding document, followed by names of the Oneida contingent.

Oberlin replaced Oneida as "the hot-bed of Abolitionism", "the most progressive college in the United States". Oberlin sent forth cadres of minister-abolitionists every year:

From this fountain streams of anti-slavery influence began at once to flow. Pamphlets, papers, letters, lecturers and preachers, and school teachers, some five hundred each winter, went forth everywhere preaching the anti-slavery word. It was the influence emanating from this school that saved our country in its great hour of peril. There were thousands of other co-operating influences, but had that which went out from Oberlin been subtracted, there can hardly remain a doubt that freedom would have foundered in the storm. Indeed it is doubtful whether there would have been any storm. The nation probably would have meekly yielded to the dominion of the slave power, and the Western Hemisphere would have become a den of tyrants and slaves. As it was, we were scarcely saved.

=== 19th century – post founding ===
Asa Mahan (1799–1889) accepted the position of first president of the Oberlin Collegiate Institute in 1835, simultaneously serving as the chair of intellectual and moral philosophy and professor of theology. Mahan's strong advocacy of immediatism—the immediate and complete freeing of all slaves—greatly influenced the philosophy of the college. The same year, two years after its founding, the school began admitting African Americans. The college experienced financial distress, and Rev. John Keep and William Dawes were sent to England to raise funds in 1839–40. A nondenominational seminary, Oberlin's Graduate School of Theology (first called the undergraduate Theological Department), was established alongside the college in 1833. In 1965, the board of trustees voted to discontinue graduate instruction in theology at Oberlin, and in September 1966, six faculty members and 22 students merged with the Divinity School of Vanderbilt University. Oberlin's role as an educator of African-American students prior to the Civil War and thereafter was significant. In 1844, Oberlin Collegiate Institute graduated its first black student, George Boyer Vashon, who later became one of the founding professors of Howard University and the first black lawyer admitted to the Bar in New York State.

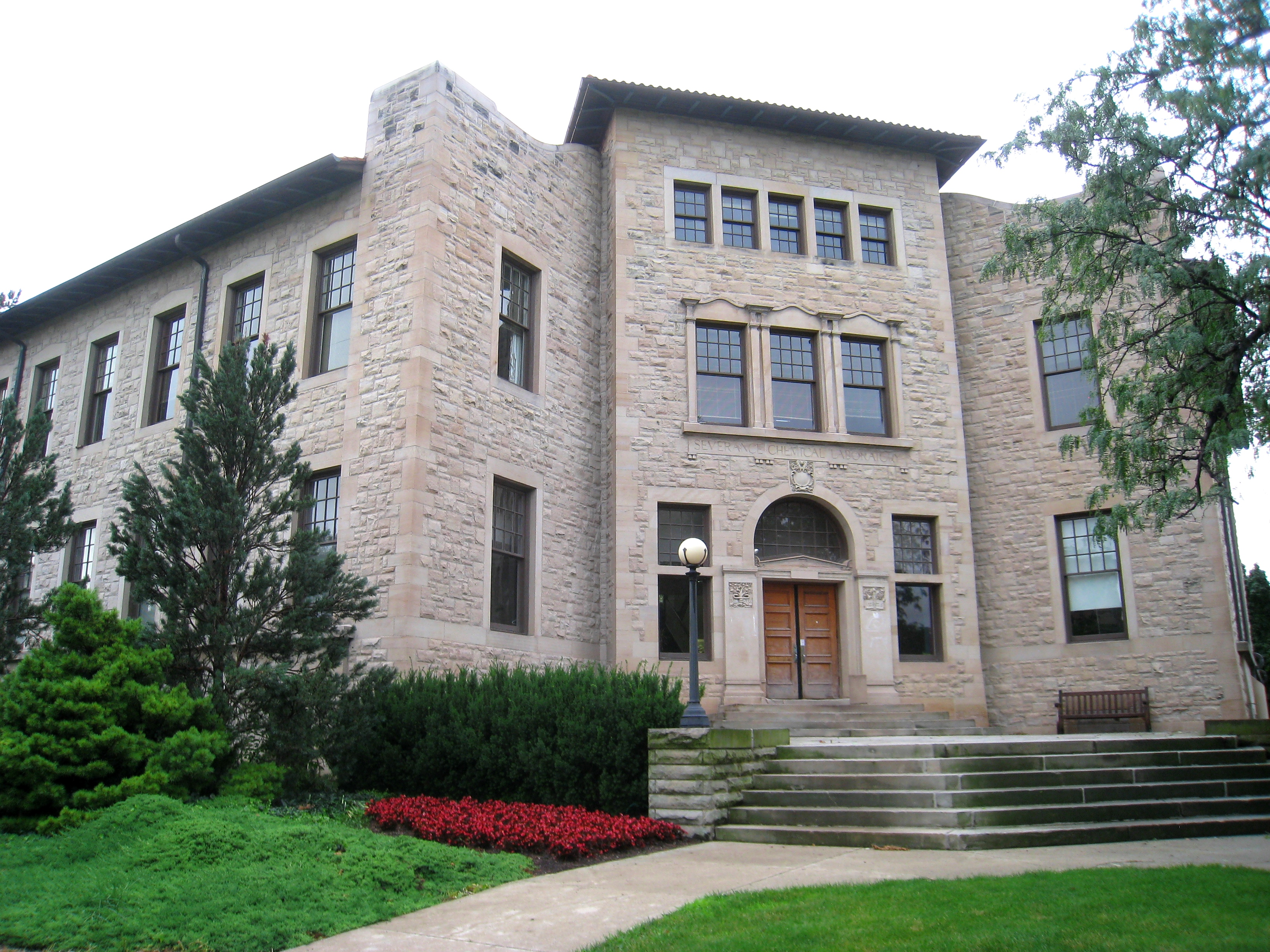
Severance Hall

The college's treatment of African Americans was inconsistent. Although intensely anti-slavery, and admitting black students from 1835, the school began segregating its black students by the 1880s with the fading of evangelical idealism. Nonetheless, Oberlin graduates accounted for a significant percentage of African-American college graduates by the end of the 19th century. One such black alumnus was William Howard Day, who would go on to found Cleveland's first black newspaper, The Aliened American. The college was listed as a National Historic Landmark on December 21, 1965, for its significance in admitting African Americans and women.

Oberlin is the oldest coeducational college in the United States, having admitted four women in 1837 to its two-year "women's program". These four women, who were the first to enter as full students, were Mary Kellogg (Fairchild), Mary Caroline Rudd, Mary Hosford, and Elizabeth Prall. All but Kellogg graduated. Mary Jane Patterson graduated with honors in 1862, the first black woman to earn a B.A. degree. Soon, women were fully integrated into the college, and comprised from a third to half of the student body. The religious founders, especially evangelical theologian Charles Grandison Finney, saw women as morally superior to men. Oberlin ceased operating for seven months in 1839 and 1840 due to lack of funds, making it the second-oldest continuously operating coeducational liberal arts college in the United States.

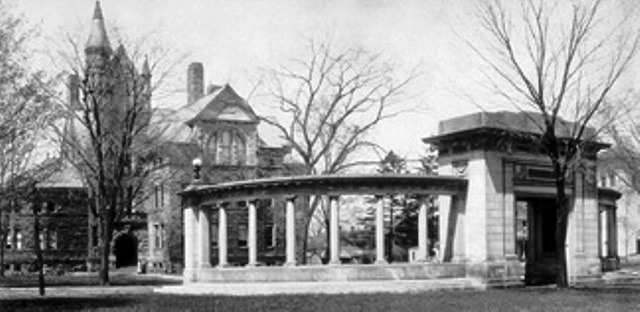
Peters Hall, the Oberlin Administration Building, in 1909

Mahan, who was often in conflict with faculty, resigned his position as president in 1850. Replacing him was famed abolitionist and preacher Charles Grandison Finney, a professor at the college since its founding, who served until 1866. At the same time, the institute was renamed "Oberlin College", and in 1851 received a charter with that name. Under Finney's leadership, Oberlin's faculty and students increased their abolitionist activity. They participated with the townspeople in efforts to assist fugitive slaves on the Underground Railroad, where Oberlin was a stop, as well as to resist the Fugitive Slave Act. One historian called Oberlin "the town that started the Civil War" due to its reputation as a hotbed of abolitionism. In 1858, both students and faculty were involved in the controversial Oberlin–Wellington Rescue of a fugitive slave, which received national press coverage. Two participants in this raid, Lewis Sheridan Leary and John Anthony Copeland, along with another Oberlin resident, Shields Green, also participated in John Brown's Raid on Harpers Ferry. This heritage was commemorated on campus by the 1977 installation of sculptor Cameron Armstrong's "Underground Railroad Monument", a railroad track rising from the ground toward the sky, and monuments to the Oberlin-Wellington Rescue and the Harper's Ferry Raid, which followed an 1841 incident in which a group of abolitionists from Oberlin, using saws and axes, freed two captured fugitive slaves from the Lorain County jail.

In 1866, James Fairchild became Oberlin's third president, and first alumnus to lead it. A committed abolitionist, Fairchild was at that point chair of theology and moral philosophy. During Fairchild's tenure, the faculty and physical plant of the college expanded dramatically. In 1889, he resigned as president but remained as chair of systematic theology. In 1896, Fairchild returned as acting president until 1898.

Oberlin College sent many Christian missionaries abroad. In 1881, students at Oberlin formed the Oberlin Band to journey as a group to remote Shanxi province in China. A total of 30 members of the Oberlin Band worked in Shanxi as missionaries over the next two decades. Ten died of disease, and in 1900, fifteen of the Oberlin missionaries, including wives and children, were killed by Boxers or Chinese government soldiers during the Boxer Rebellion. The Oberlin Shansi Memorial Association, was established in their memory. It sponsors Oberlin graduates to teach in China, India, and Japan. It also hosts scholars and artists from Asia to spend time on the Oberlin campus.

=== 20th century ===
Peters Hall, home of the language departments, in 2010

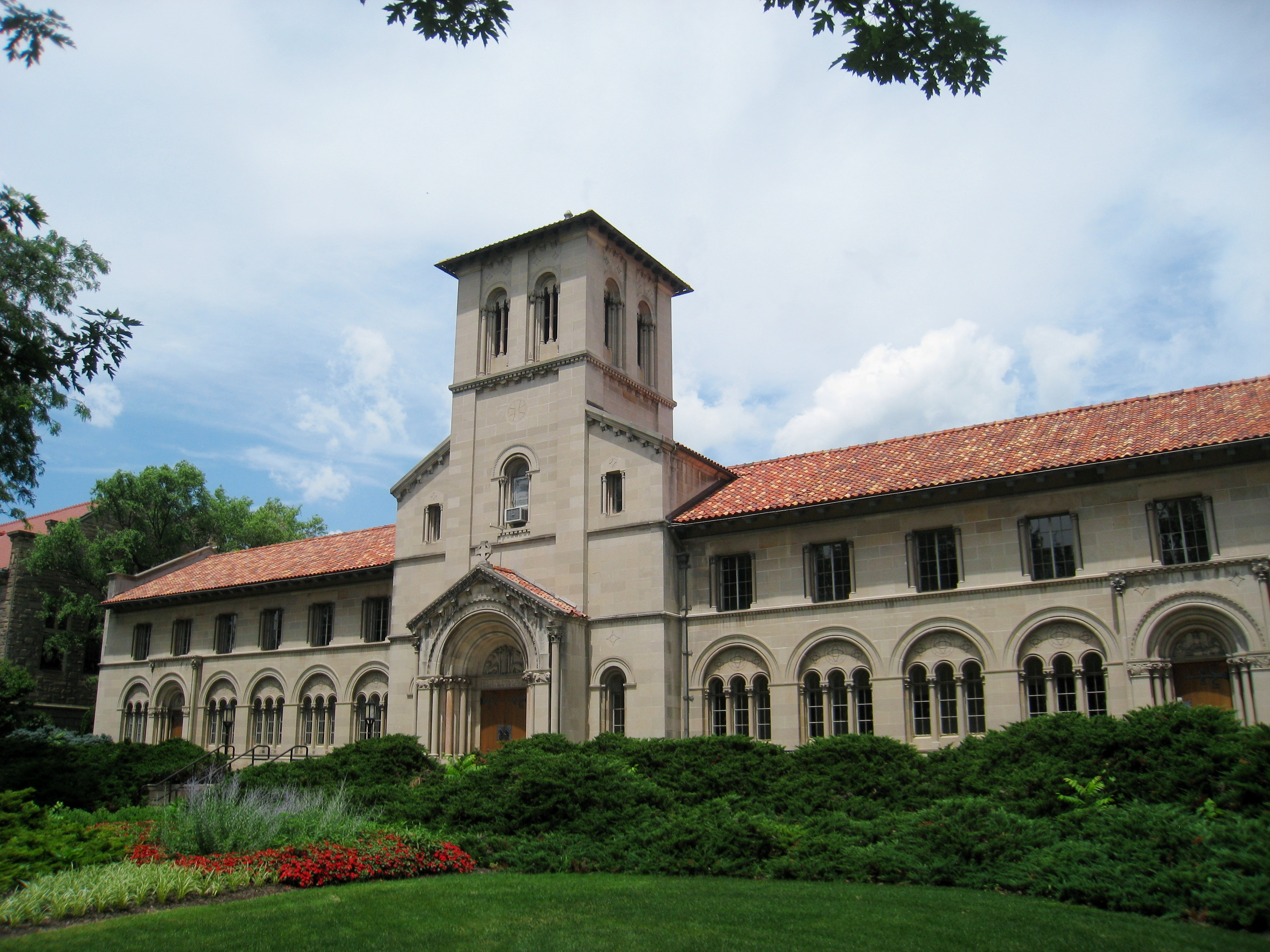
Bosworth Hall

Henry Churchill King became Oberlin's sixth president in 1902. At Oberlin from 1884 onward, he taught in mathematics, philosophy, and theology. Robert K. Carr served as Oberlin College president from 1960 to 1970, during the tumultuous period of student activism. Under his presidency, the school's physical plant added 15 new buildings. Under his leadership, student involvement in college affairs increased, with students serving on nearly all college committees as voting members (including the board of trustees). In 1970, Oberlin made the cover of Life as one of the first colleges in the country to have co-ed dormitories. Despite these accomplishments, Carr clashed repeatedly with the students over the Vietnam War, and he left office in 1969. History professor Ellsworth C. Carlson became acting president.

Robert W. Fuller had left Oberlin without graduating to pursue graduate work in physics, but had served as dean at Trinity College. He was unanimous choice of the selection committee in 1970. At 33 years old, Fuller became tenth president of the college, one of the youngest college presidents in U.S. history. His Oberlin presidency was a turbulent time at Oberlin and in higher education generally. Fuller called for reforming the curriculum, addressing the status of women, and enlarging the role of students in governance. He tripled the enrollment of minorities. In what was called the Oberlin Experiment, he hired Jack Scott as Athletic Director, who recruited and hired the first four African-American athletic coaches at a predominantly white American college or university, including Tommie Smith, the gold medalist sprinter from the 1968 Summer Olympics.

Fuller was succeeded by the longtime Dean of the Conservatory, Emil Danenberg, who served as president from 1975 to 1982, and died in office. In 1983, Oberlin hired S. Frederick Starr as its 12th president. Starr's academic and musical accomplishments boded well for his stewardship of both the college and the Oberlin College Conservatory of Music. Despite increasing minority hiring, Starr's tenure was marked by clashes with students over divestment from South Africa and the dismissal of a campus minister, as well as Starr's reframing Oberlin as the "Harvard of the Midwest". A particularly vitriolic clash with students on the front lawn of his home in April 1990 led Starr to take a leave of absence from July 1991 to February 1992. He resigned in 1993.

=== 21st century ===
Nancy Dye became the 13th president of Oberlin College in July 1994, succeeding the embattled Starr. Oberlin's first female president, she oversaw the construction of new buildings, increased admissions selectivity, and helped increase the endowment with the largest capital campaign to that point. Dye was known for her accessibility and inclusiveness. Especially in her early years, she was a regular attendee at football games, concerts, and dorm parties. Dye served as president for nearly 13 years, resigning on June 30, 2007. Marvin Krislov served as president of the college from 2007 to 2017, moving on to assume the presidency of Pace University. On May 30, 2017, Carmen Twillie Ambar was announced as the 15th president of Oberlin College, becoming the first African-American person and second woman to hold the position.

Oberlin's first and only hired trade union expert, Chris Howell, argued that the college engaged in "illegal" tactics to attempt to decertify its service workers' July 1999 vote to become members of United Automobile Workers union. Howell wrote that college workers sought the union's representation in response to the administration's effort to "speed up work" to meet a "mounting budget crisis".

In February 2013, the college received significant press concerning its so-called "No Trespass List", a secret list maintained by the college of individuals barred from campus without due process. Student activists and members of the surrounding town joined to form the One Town Campaign, which challenged this policy. On February 13, 2013, a forum at the Oberlin Public Library that attracted over 200 people, including members of the college administration, the Oberlin city council and national press, saw speakers compare the atmosphere of the college to "a gated community".

In September 2014, on Rosh Hashanah, Oberlin Students for Free Palestine placed 2,133 black flags in the main square of the campus as a "call to action" in honor of the 2,133 Palestinians who died in the 2014 Israel–Gaza conflict. In January 2016, hundreds of Oberlin alumni signed a letter to the Oberlin administration stating that this protest was an example of antisemitism on the campus. Oberlin SFP responded with their own letter, detailing why protest of Israel does not constitute antisemitism.

In early 2016, an Oberlin professor, Joy Karega, suggested Israel was behind 9/11 and blamed it for the Charlie Hebdo attacks and for ISIS, prompting a rebuke from faculty and administration. After five-and-a-half months of discussion, the school suspended and then fired her. The following week, the home of a Jewish professor at Oberlin was vandalized and a note that read "Gas Jews Die" was left on his front door.

Oberlin came under federal investigation in late 2023 by the Department of Education's Office for Civil Rights for alleged breach of Title VI, which protects students from discrimination because of their religion. The focus of the investigation was on past statements of Professor Mohammad Jafar Mahallati, which some viewed as antisemitic.

==== Gibson's Bakery v. Oberlin College ====
In 2016, a black Oberlin student was caught shoplifting two bottles of wine from Gibson's Bakery and Market, a downtown Oberlin business. A scuffle ensued between Oberlin students and Gibson's staff, and the students involved pled guilty to misdemeanor charges. Oberlin faculty and students subsequently staged large demonstrations urging a boycott of Gibson's on the grounds that the store was racist, and Gibson's sued alleging libel and other charges. In June 2019, the college was found liable for libel and tortious interference in a lawsuit initiated by the store; the bakery was awarded damages of $44 million by the jury, but a legal cap on damages reduced the award to $31.5 million. In October 2019, the college appealed the case to the Ohio District Courts of Appeals in Akron, Ohio. On March 31, 2022, the Court of Appeals unanimously dismissed both appeals, Oberlin and Gibson, upholding the jury verdict and Judge Miraldi's decisions. The Supreme Court of Ohio chose to not accept the appeal and cross-appeal on August 29, 2022. In December 2022, Oberlin College paid Gibson's Bakery $36.59 million, the entire amount due. "We hope that the end of the litigation will begin the healing of our entire community", said the college.

== Academics ==
Academic rankings

Liberal arts
- U.S. News & World Report: 55
- Washington Monthly: 114

National
- Forbes: 197
- WSJ/College Pulse: 112

Oberlin was ranked tied for the 55th-best national liberal arts college in the 2025 edition of U.S. News & World Report's "Best Colleges" ranking.

Forbes ranked Oberlin 197th out of the top 500 rated private and public colleges and universities in America for the 2024-25 report. Oberlin was also ranked 46th among liberal arts universities and 29th in the Midwest.

Of Oberlin's nearly 3,000 students, nearly 2,400 are enrolled in the College of Arts & Sciences, a little over 400 in the Conservatory of Music, and the remaining 180 or so in both College and Conservatory under the five-year Double-Degree program.

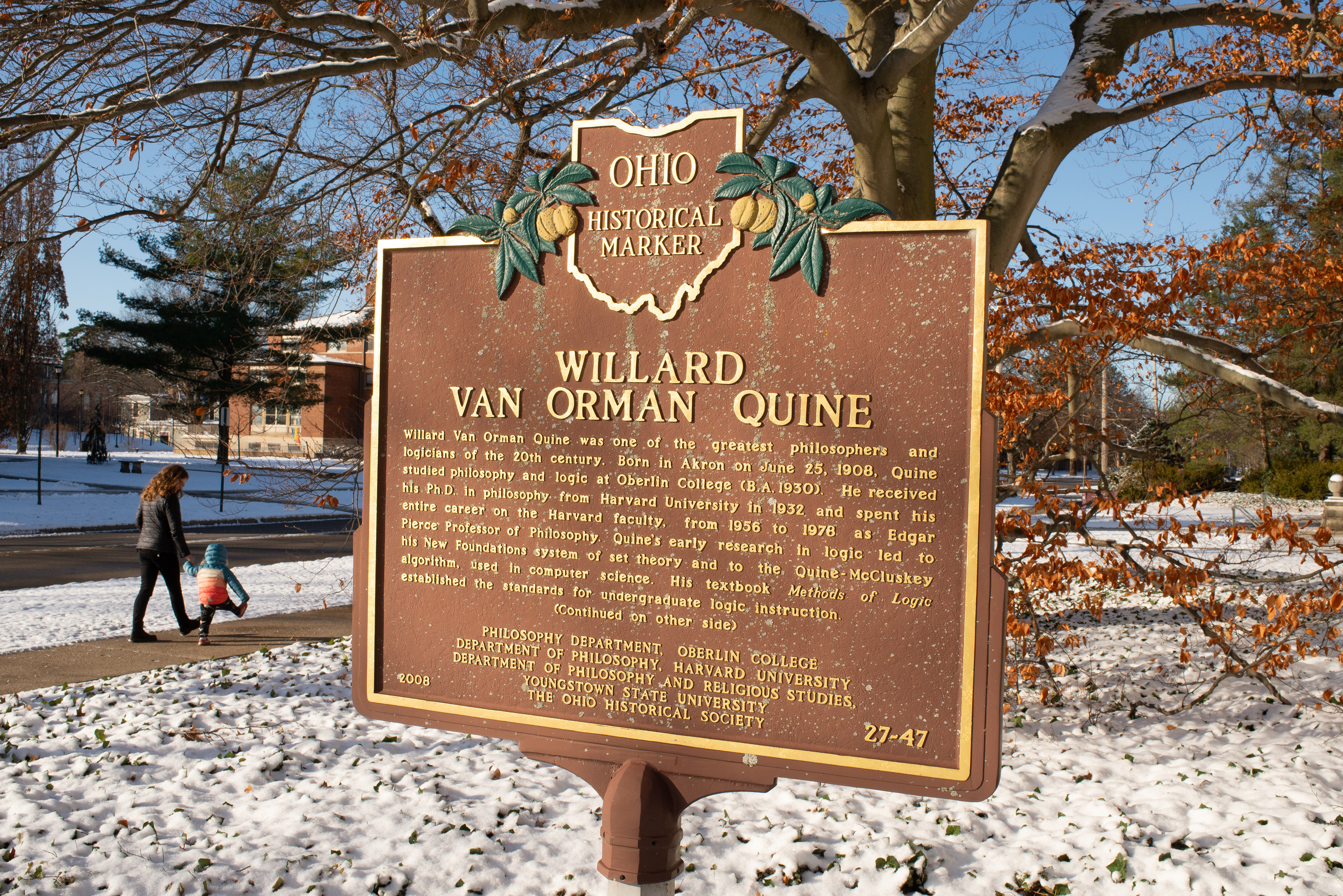
Historical Marker for WVO Quine (BA 1930) outside King Building

The College of Arts & Sciences offers over 50 majors, minors, and concentrations. Its most popular undergraduate majors, based on 2023 graduates, were Music Performance (89), Psychology (50), and Biology (41).

The Conservatory of Music is located on the college campus. Conservatory admission is selective, with over 1400 applicants worldwide auditioning for 120 seats. There are 500 performances yearly, most free of charge, with concerts and recitals almost daily. The Conservatory was one of the recipients of the 2009 National Medal of Arts. The Allen Memorial Art Museum, with over 13,000 holdings, was the first college art museum west of the Alleghenies.

=== College Libraries ===
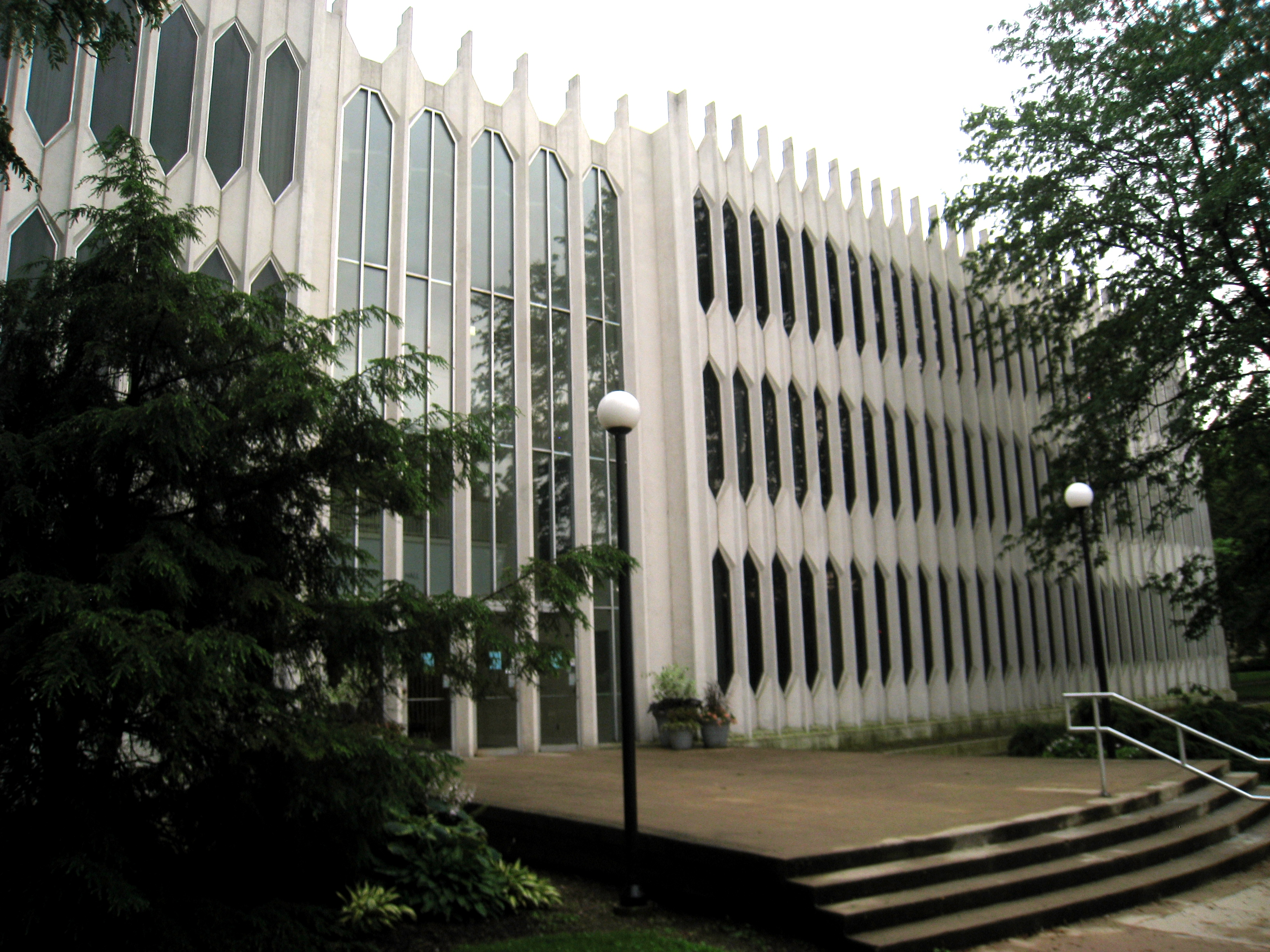
Bibbins Hall, Oberlin Conservatory

The Oberlin College Libraries has branches for art, music, and science, a central storage facility, and the Mary Church Terrell Main Library. The libraries have collections of print and media materials and provide access to various online databases and journals. Beyond the 2.4 million-plus items available on campus, Oberlin students have access to more than 46 million volumes from over 85 Ohio institutions through the OhioLINK consortium. In the summer of 2007, the main level of the main library was converted into an Academic Commons that provides integrated learning support and is a hub of both academic and social activity.

=== Experimental College ===
The college's "Experimental College" or ExCo program, a student-run department, allows any student or interested person to teach their own class for a limited amount of college credit. ExCo classes by definition focus on material not covered by existing departments or faculty.

=== Winter term ===
Oberlin's Winter term, occurring each January, is described as "a time for students to pursue interests outside of regular course offerings through immersive learning experiences." Students may work alone or in groups, either on or off campus, and may design their own project or pick from a list of projects and internships set up by the college each year. Students must complete a winter term project three years out of their four in the College of Arts and Sciences. Projects range from serious academic research with co-authorship in scientific journals, humanitarian projects, making films about historic Chicago neighborhoods, and learning how to bartend. A full-credit project is suggested to involve five to six hours per weekday.

=== Creativity and Leadership ===
Created in 2005 as a part of the Northeast Ohio Collegiate Entrepreneurship Program (NEOCEP), a Kauffman Campuses Initiative, and sponsored by the Burton D. Morgan and Ewing Marion Kauffman, the department is focused on supporting and highlighting entrepreneurship within the student body. This is done through a series of classes, symposia, Winter Term programs, grants, and fellowships available at no cost to current students and in some cases, recent alumni. One such opportunity is the Creativity and Leadership Fellowship, a one-year fellowship for graduating seniors that includes a stipend of up to $30,000 to advance an entrepreneurial venture.

In 2012, the Creativity and Leadership department announced LaunchU, a business accelerator open to Oberlin College students and alumni who are pursuing an entrepreneurial venture. The selective, three-week intensive program connects the participants with other entrepreneurs and business leaders chosen from the surrounding northeast Ohio region as well as the extensive Oberlin College alumni network. LaunchU culminates in a public pitch competition before a guest panel of investors, where the participants have the opportunity to be awarded up to $15,000 in funding. The winner of the 2014 LaunchU pitch competition was Chai Energy, a Los Angeles-based green energy startup focused on modernizing and personalizing home energy monitoring. In 2014, LaunchU announced the creation of an online network in order to build stronger connections between entrepreneurs within the Oberlin College students and alumni network with a focus on attracting younger alumni.

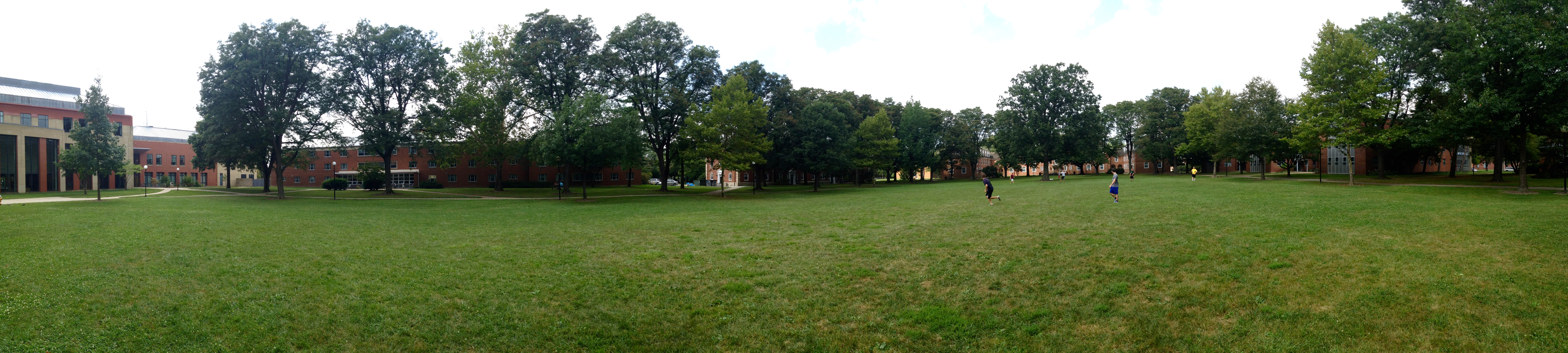
Oberlin's North Quad, the center of North Campus and locations of the Barrows, Burton, East, Noah and Barnard Houses

== Campus culture ==
=== Political activism ===
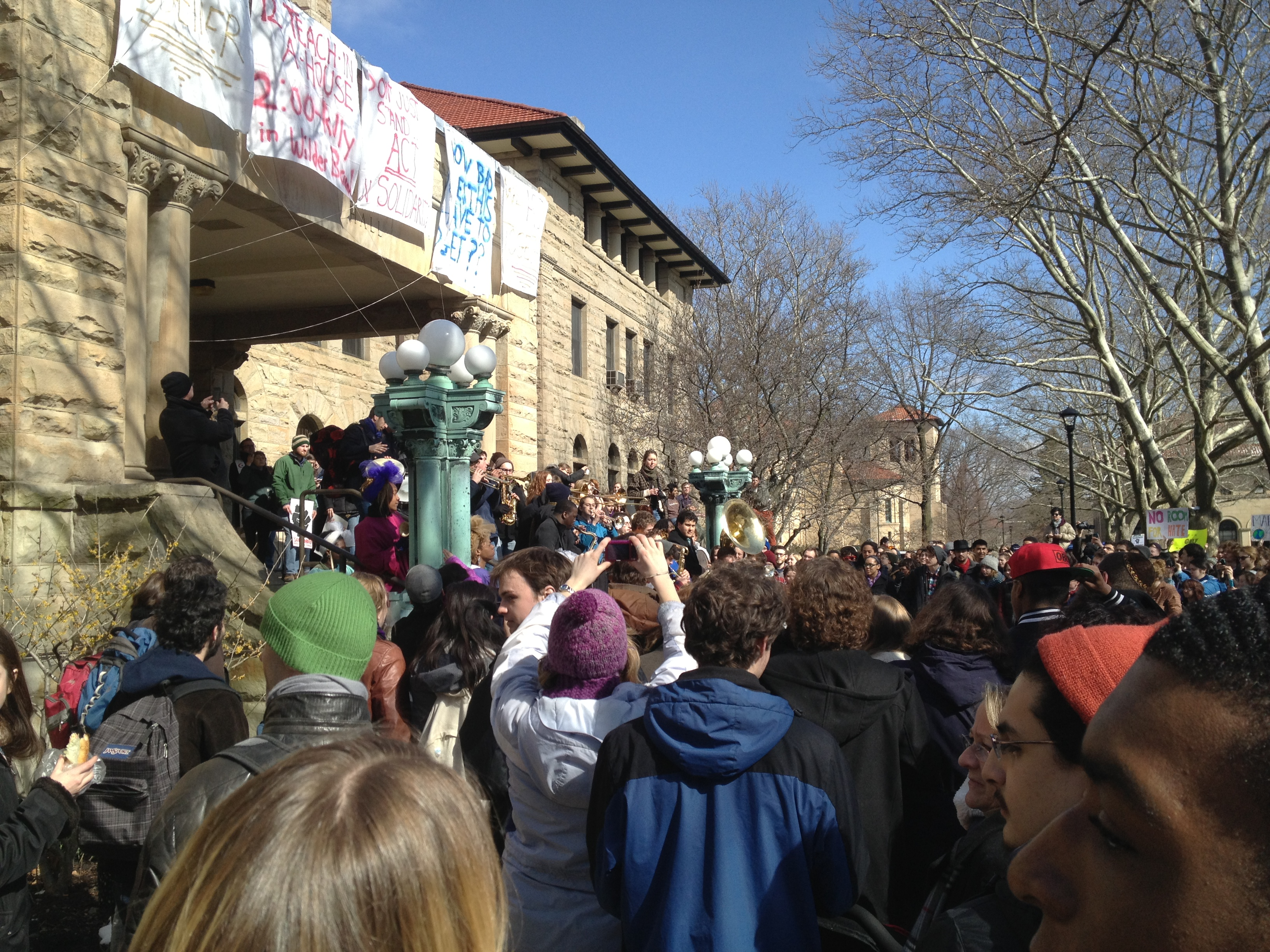
Oberlin protest speakers

The Oberlin student body has a long history of activism and a reputation for being notably liberal. The college was ranked among The Princeton Review's list of "Colleges with a Conscience" in 2005.

In the 1960s, Memorial Arch became a rallying point for the college's civil rights activists and its anti-war movement. Oberlin supplied a disproportionate number of participants in Mississippi Freedom Summer, rebuilt the Antioch Missionary Baptist Church in the Carpenters for Christmas project, supported NAACP sponsored sit-ins in Cleveland to integrate the building-trades, and with the SCLC participated in demonstrations at Hammermill Paper. In 1995, Emeritus Professor of Sociology (1966–2007) James Leo Walsh told The Oberlin Review that students "carried out dozens of protests against the Vietnam war ranging from peaceful picketing to surrounding a local naval recruiter's car". In November 2002, 100 college workers, students, and faculty held a "mock funeral 'for the spirit of Oberlin'" in response to the administration's laying off 11 workers and reducing the work hours of five other workers without negotiation with college unions. Oberlin Students have protested instances of fracking in Ohio such as "the first natural gas and fracturing industry conference in the state," in 2011.

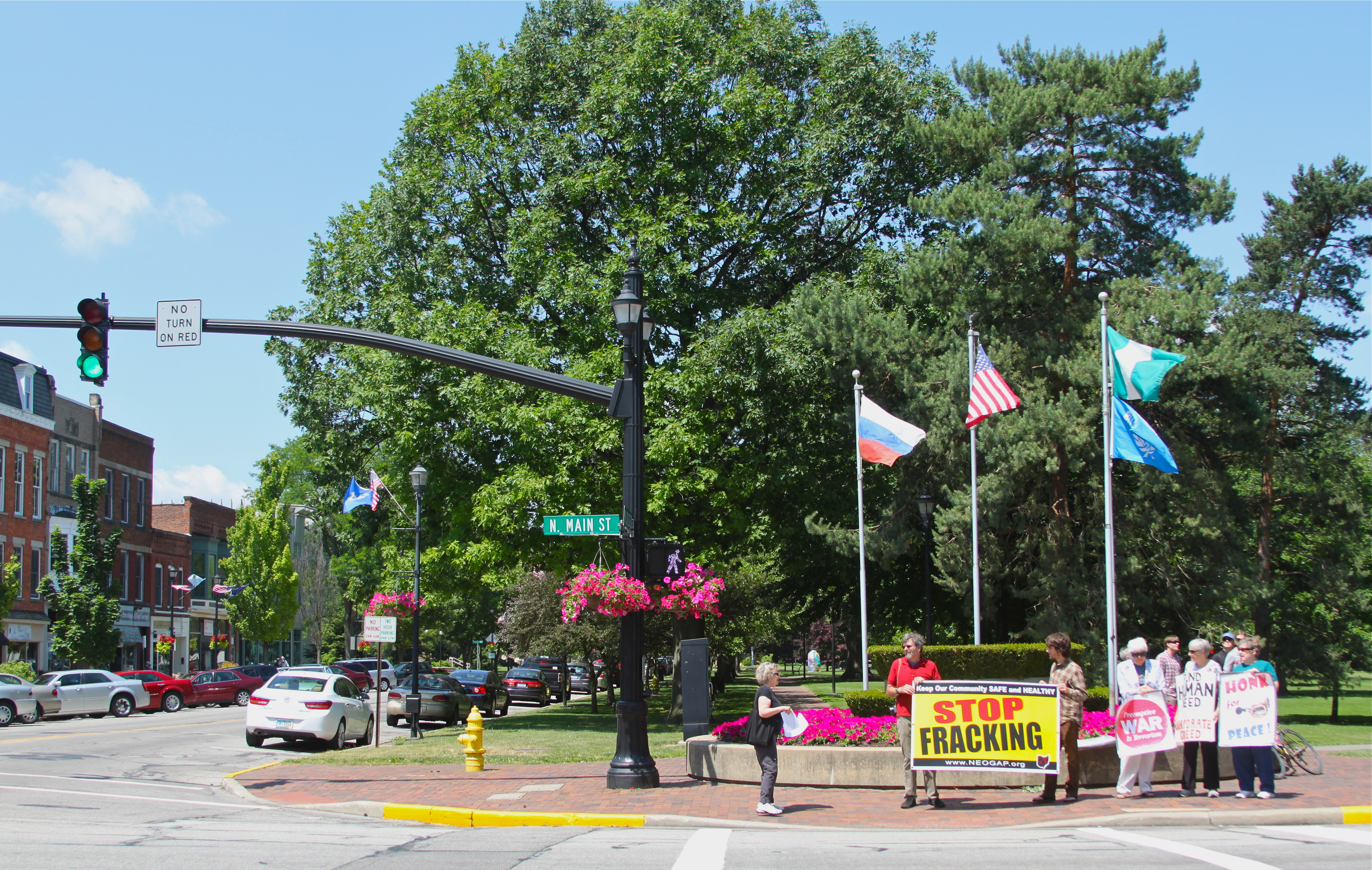
Students and town residents protest the War in Afghanistan and oil well fracking

In 2004, student activism led to a campus-wide ban on sales of Coca-Cola products due to the company's human and labor rights violations. However, the ban was revoked in spring 2014, and students may now buy Coca-Cola products from the student union.

In 2013, after the discovery of hateful messages and the alleged sighting of a person wearing KKK robes, president Marvin Krislov cancelled classes and called for a day of reflection and change. In a public statement, he stated that an investigation had identified two students believed to be largely responsible, who had been removed from campus. One of the students responsible said to police that he was "doing it as a joke to see the college overreact to it".

During the fall 2014 semester, Oberlin's Student Labor Action Coalition organized a petition to permit dining hall temporary workers working four-hour shifts to eat one meal from food the college throws out each day. The petition garnered over 1,000 signatures and resulted in workers obtaining the opportunity to put food into a management-given styrofoam container to eat after their shifts.

In May 2015, students temporarily took over their school's administration building to protest a $2,300 increase in tuition cost between the 2015 and 2016 academic school years. Students initially proposed, "... moving from providing merit aid to need-based scholarships, loosening on-campus dining and housing requirements, reducing food waste and temporary workers in Campus Dining Services ... " to the school's Vice President of Finance Mike Frandsen on Monday, April 27, 2015, in which their demands were declined for issue. $10,931,088 were allocated to management salaries for the 2013–2014 school year, much of which came from student tuition.

In December 2015, Oberlin's Black Student Union issued a series of 50 specific demands of the college and conservatory including promoting certain black faculty to tenured positions, hiring more black faculty, firing other faculty members, and obtaining a $15 an hour minimum wage for all campus workers and guaranteed health care in their contracts. The board of trustees responded by appointing some of the individual faculty and by, "reviewing the allocation of faculty positions with consideration of how they will contribute to interactional diversity in the curriculum" in the college's 2016–2021 strategic plan. The college opposed firing any employees in response and neglected to issue formal responses to many of the other demands, though it has sought to cut wages and health care funds for administrators, office workers and library support staff during contract negotiations with the Office and Professional Employees International Union. Many campus workers still earn the minimum wage. Over 75 students protested the college's attempt to alter administrator, office worker and library support staff contracts during spring 2016 contract negotiations.

The pro-Israel advocacy group Alums for Campus Fairness has called on Oberlin to address alleged anti-Semitic hate speech directed at Jewish students.

=== Student Cooperative Association ===
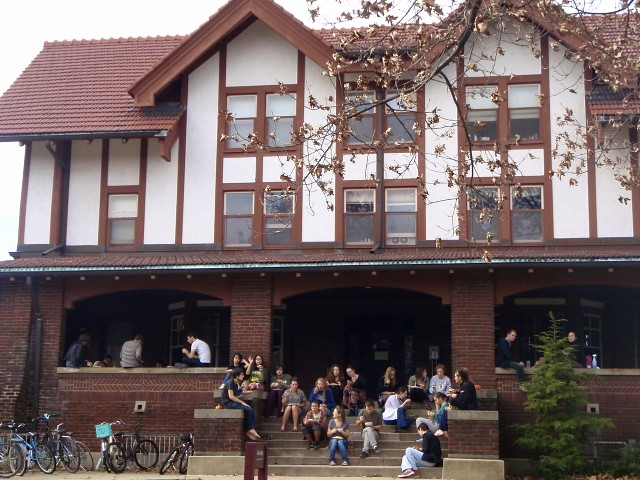
Keep Cottage, one of the four housing co-ops

The Oberlin Student Cooperative Association, or OSCA, is a non-profit corporation that houses 174 students in four housing co-ops and feeds 594 students in eight dining co-ops. Its budget is more than $2 million, making it the third-largest of its kind in North America behind the Berkeley Student Cooperative and the Inter-Cooperative Council of Ann Arbor.

OSCA is entirely student-run, with all participating students working as cooks, buyers, administrators, and coordinators. Every member is required to do at least one hour per week of cleaning if they are able, encouraging accountability for the community and the space. Most decisions within OSCA are made by modified consensus. Oberlin bans all fraternities and sororities, making the co-ops the largest student-organized social system at the college. In addition to OSCA's four housing/dining and three dining-only cooperatives, Brown Bag Co-op is an OSCA-backed grocery that sells personal servings of food at bulk prices. OSCA also funds the Nicaragua Sister Partnership (NICSIS), a "sister cooperative" with Nicaragua's National Union of Farmers and Ranchers (UNAG). Outside of OSCA, other Oberlin co-ops include the Bike Co-op, Pottery Co-op, and SWAP: The Oberlin Book Co-op.

In the spring of 2013, the Board of Directors of OSCA made a decision in a closed-door meeting to remove the Kosher-Halal Co-op from the Association after disputes over budgets and kitchen inspections. Although KHC served both Kosher and Halal food, the membership was predominantly Jewish, and some alumni wrote that they believed the expulsion to be anti-Semitic in nature.

=== Music ===
In addition to Oberlin Conservatory, Oberlin has musical opportunities available for amateur musicians and students in the college. Oberlin Steel, a steel pan ensemble founded around 1980, plays calypso/soca music from Trinidad and Tobago and has been performing at Oberlin's Commencement Illumination event for over 30 years. Oberlin College Taiko, founded in 2008, explores and shares Japanese taiko drumming as both a traditional and contemporary art form. The entirely student-run Oberlin College Marching Band (OCMB), founded in 1998, performs at various sporting events including football games, women's rugby, and pep rallies throughout the year. There are a number of a cappella groups, including: Pitch Please (all gender, all genre), the Obertones (men and nonbinary), Nothing But Treble (women and nonbinary), the Acapelicans (women and nonbinary), 'Round Midnight (all gender, jazz/folk). Other notable music organizations include the Black Musicians Guild and the Arts and Sciences Orchestra. Students in the college can form chamber groups and receive coaching through the Conservatory. Student composers also provide a demand for musicians to perform their work.

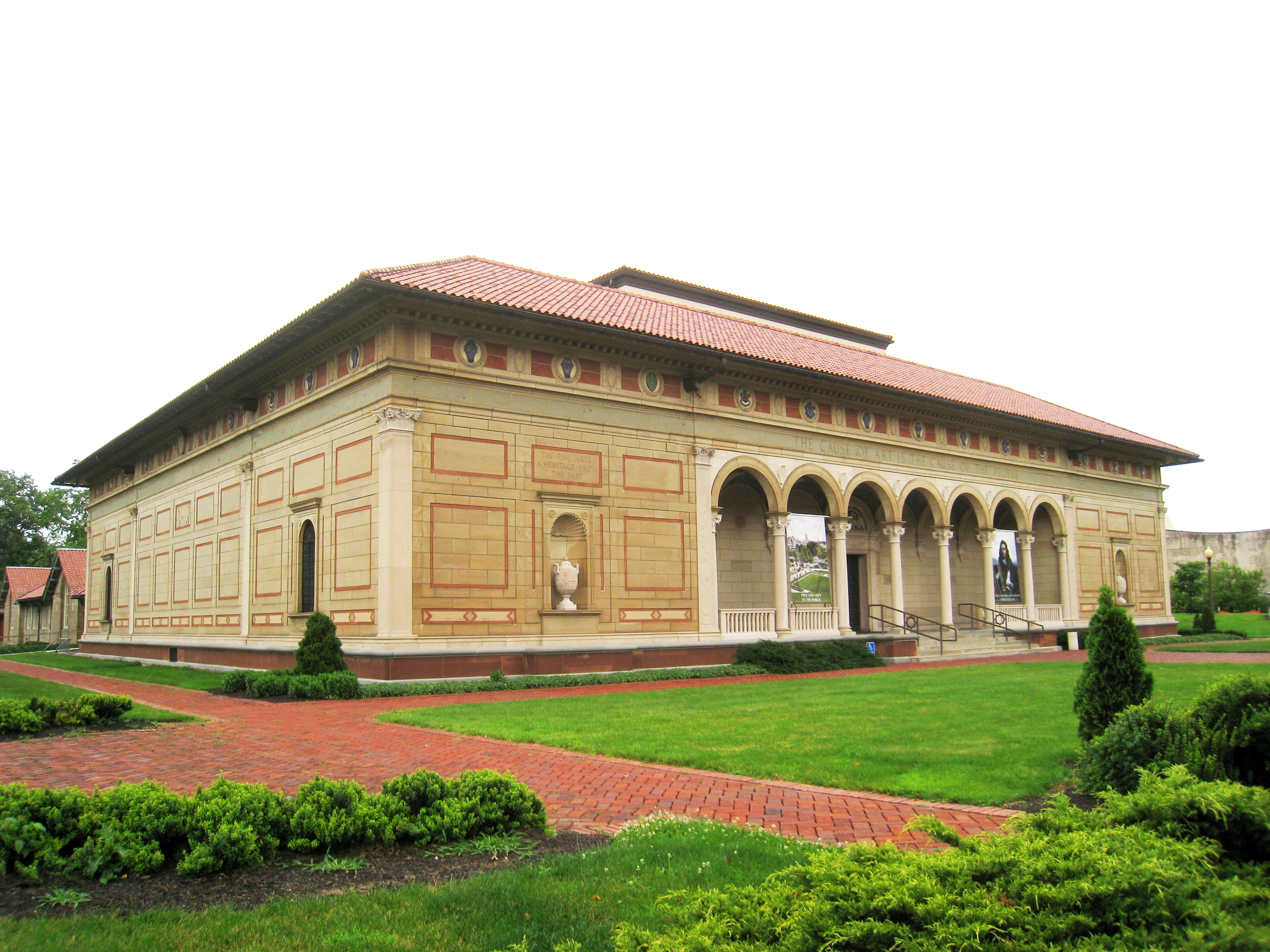
Allen Memorial Art Museum, location of Oberlin's Art Rental program

=== Film ===
Film in Oberlin began with Thomas Edison's moving picture being shown in February 1900. Just seven years later, the Apollo Theater opened, and installed sound equipment for the 1928 The Jazz Singer, the first "talkie". In 2012 (after a year of renovations) the building became the centerpiece for the Danny DeVito and Rhea Perlman Cinema Studies Center for Media Education and Production. The area above the theatre includes editing labs, an animation area, a recording studio and small projection screening room.

=== Photography ===
One of the most prominent professors for photography was Pipo Nguyen-duy, murdered in 2026. His demise was the subject of international press coverage. He taught at the college for more than thirty years. At the time of his death, he held the chair of the Department of Studio Art. The student newspaper described him as "a monumental figure on a small campus in rural Ohio."

== Sustainability ==
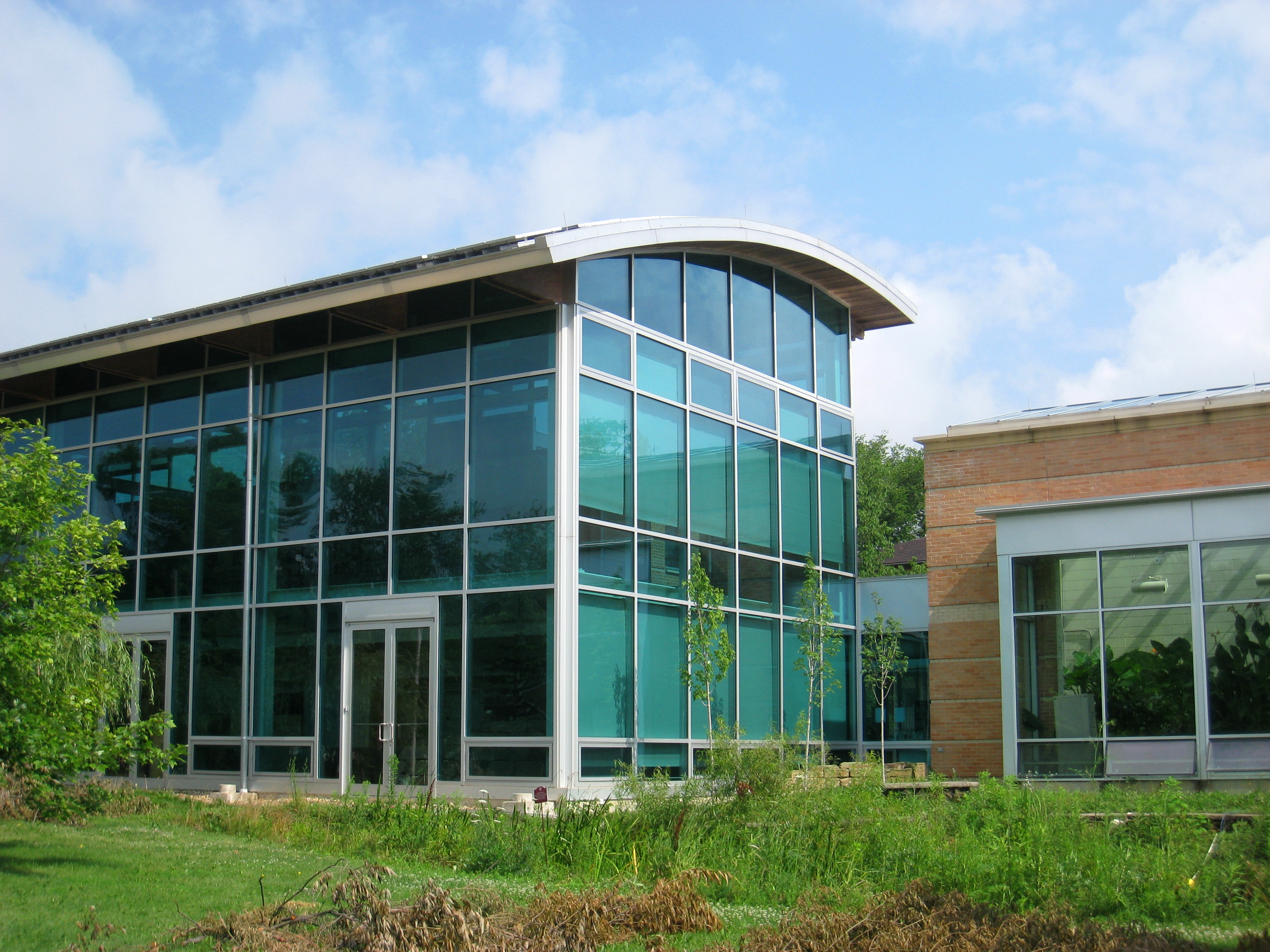
The Adam Joseph Lewis Center, location of the environmental studies department

In 2006, Oberlin became one of the charter institutions to sign the ACUPCC and set a target climate neutrality date for 2025. Oberlin's innovative Adam Joseph Lewis Center For Environmental Studies, a building the Department of Energy labeled as one of the "milestone" buildings of the 20th century, incorporates a 4,600-square-foot (430-square-meter) photovoltaic array, the biggest of its kind in Ohio at the time. The AJLC also features a Living Machine, garden, orchard, and parking-lot solar array.

The school utilizes biodiesel, hybrid, and electric vehicles for various purposes, offers financial support to a local transit company providing public transportation to the school, and has been home to the Oberlin Bike Co-op, a cooperatively run bicycle center, since 1986. Each residence hall monitors and displays real time and historic electricity and water use. Some dorms also have special lamps which display a color depending on how real time energy use compares to the average historic energy use. The school's Campus Committee on Shareholder Responsibility provides students, faculty, and staff with the opportunity to make suggestions and decisions on proxy votes. A student board, the Oberlin College Green EDGE Fund, manages a set of accounts to support local sustainability, resource efficiency, and carbon offsetting projects. The Green EDGE Fund, created in 2007, allocates grants for environmental sustainability projects and verifiable carbon offsetting projects within the Oberlin community, as well as loans from a revolving fund for projects at Oberlin College that reduce resource consumption and have calculable financial savings for the college.

== Campus publications and media ==
Oberlin students publish a wide variety of periodicals. The college's largest publications are The Oberlin Review and The Grape. The Oberlin Review is a traditional weekly newspaper, focusing on current events, with a circulation of around 1,700. There is also a newspaper pertaining to the interests of students of color, called BIPOC Lenses.

Magazines on campus include Wilder Voice, a magazine for creative nonfiction and long-form journalism, The Plum Creek Review, a literary review containing student-written fiction, poetry, translations, and visual art, Headwaters Magazine, an environmental magazine, and The Synapse, a science magazine. Spiral is a magazine focused on genre fiction. The college also produces a quarterly alumni magazine, while the Conservatory publishes its own magazine once a year.

== Athletics ==
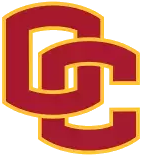
Oberlin athletics logo

The school's varsity sports teams are the Yeomen and Yeowomen. Early on, athletes were known simply as Oberlin Men or "O" Men. The name "Yeomen" arose in the early 1900s, drawing on the phonetic sound of "O" Men and the school's motto, "Learning and Labor". As women's sports arose, "Yeowomen" came to represent women athletes. In 2014, the school announced that the albino squirrel would be its official mascot, although teams would continue to be referred to as "yeomen" and "yeowomen".

Oberlin participates in the NCAA's Division III and the North Coast Athletic Conference (NCAC), a conference which includes Kenyon College, Denison University, Wooster College, Wabash College and others. Kenyon has traditionally been Oberlin's biggest rival. In 2022, leaders of the Athletic Department and various club sports spoke out in favor of increased institutional support for the teams, requesting that the college provide access to professional sports trainers and team transportation. The college also hosts several private sports teams, including the Oberlin Ultimate team.

Oberlin also has 17 club sports, including ice hockey, fencing, ultimate frisbee, soccer, rugby, equestrian, tennis, volleyball, badminton, bowling, and in martial arts such as Brazilian jiu-jitsu and aikido.

=== Baseball ===
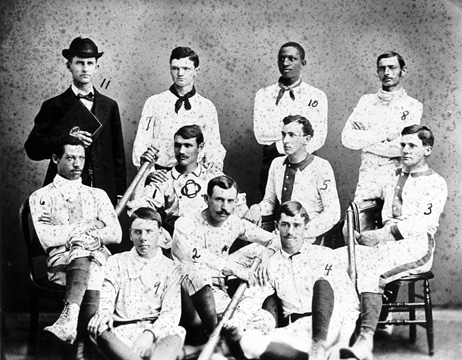
Oberlin baseball team of 1881

On May 8, 2015, the Oberlin baseball team won the championship of the NCAC. The championship was the first for Oberlin as a baseball team since it joined the NCAC in 1984.

=== Football ===
Oberlin's football team was the first team coached by John Heisman, later honored by the Heisman Trophy. Heisman led the team to a 7–0 record in 1892. Oberlin is the last college in Ohio to beat Ohio State (winning 7–6 in 1921). Though in modern times, the football team was more famous for losing streaks of 40 games (1992–1996) and 44 games (1997–2001), the Yeomen have enjoyed limited success in recent years.

=== Cheerleading ===
In 2011, Oberlin began its most recent attempt to feature a cheerleading squad. In 2006, a cheerleader fell from atop a pyramid at a football game. That injury prompted the school to restrict the club's activities, prohibiting stunting and tumbling, after which participation fizzled out. The club's charter, however, remained intact and was used to bring the squad back in 2011. Tryouts were held in the spring of 2011, and the cheerleading team went active at Oberlin's first home football game that Fall, a 42–0 win over Kenyon College. The squad also cheers for the basketball team and participates in spirit building and service events across campus and in the community.

=== Ice Hockey ===
Oberlin has a co-ed ice hockey team known as the Oberlin Plague that practices at a local ice rink in Elyria. It competes against other college teams in the area as well as community teams (non-checking); approximately five games per semester.

=== Rugby ===
Oberlin has a men's club rugby team known as the Oberlin Billy Goat's Gruff that competes in the Great Lakes Division (Ohio and Michigan) and the National Small Colleges Rugby Organization. It also has a women and trans rugby team known as the Rhino's that competes across northern Ohio.

=== Fencing ===
Oberlin has a club fencing team known as the Flaming Blades that practices and competes in foil, épée, and saber. They compete in the Midwestern Fencing Conference, Club Fencing Championships, USFA tournaments, and USCFC tournaments.

=== Ultimate ===
Oberlin has both men's and a women's Ultimate club teams, known as the Flying Horsecows and the Preying Manti, respectively. The Manti won the Division III national championship on May 19, 2019, defeating the top-ranked Bates Cold Front by a score of 13–7. The Horsecows placed 5th nationally in 2022, the highest finish in program history.

== Notable people ==
Since its founding, Oberlin alumni and faculty include 16 Rhodes Scholars, 20 Truman Scholars, 15 MacArthur fellows, 4 Rome Prize winners, and 4 Nobel Prize laureates. As of 2024, Oberlin was associated with more MacArthur fellows than any other liberal arts college. Additionally, it is the third highest producer of Fulbright scholars among undergraduate institutions.

== See also ==
- Mount Oberlin (Glacier National Park) – named after the college
- New-York Central College, McGrawville
- Oberlin College Press
