= Oberlin News-Tribune =

- Type: Weekly newspaper
- Ceased publication: 2018
- Headquarters: 42 S Main St, Oberlin, OH 44074
- Website: theoberlinnewstribune.com

The Oberlin News-Tribune was a weekly newspaper in Oberlin, Ohio. It closed in 2018.

== Staff ==
Donald J. Pease was the editor and co-publisher. Pease moved to Oberlin in 1957 after serving in the Army; he had been hired as managing editor of the News-Tribune. Later, he became part owner. The weekly newspaper won over 85 prizes at national and state level, it was named best newspaper best among papers with a circulation under 2,300 copies multiple times under his leadership.

Notable journalists who worked for the News-Tribune include Neil Zurcher, who worked at the paper for 7 years starting in 1954.
