= Lodestar method =

Method of computing attorney fees

In the legal realm, the "lodestar method" refers to a method of computing attorney's fees whereby a trial court must multiply the number of hours reasonably spent by trial counsel by a reasonable hourly rate. This figure can then be adjusted upward or downward for certain factors known as multipliers, such as contingency and the quality of the work performed, to arrive at a final fee. Under the lodestar method, the most heavily weighted multipliers are the time and labor required.
