= Robert W. Fuller =

American physicist, educator, and social reformer (1936–2025)

Robert Fuller
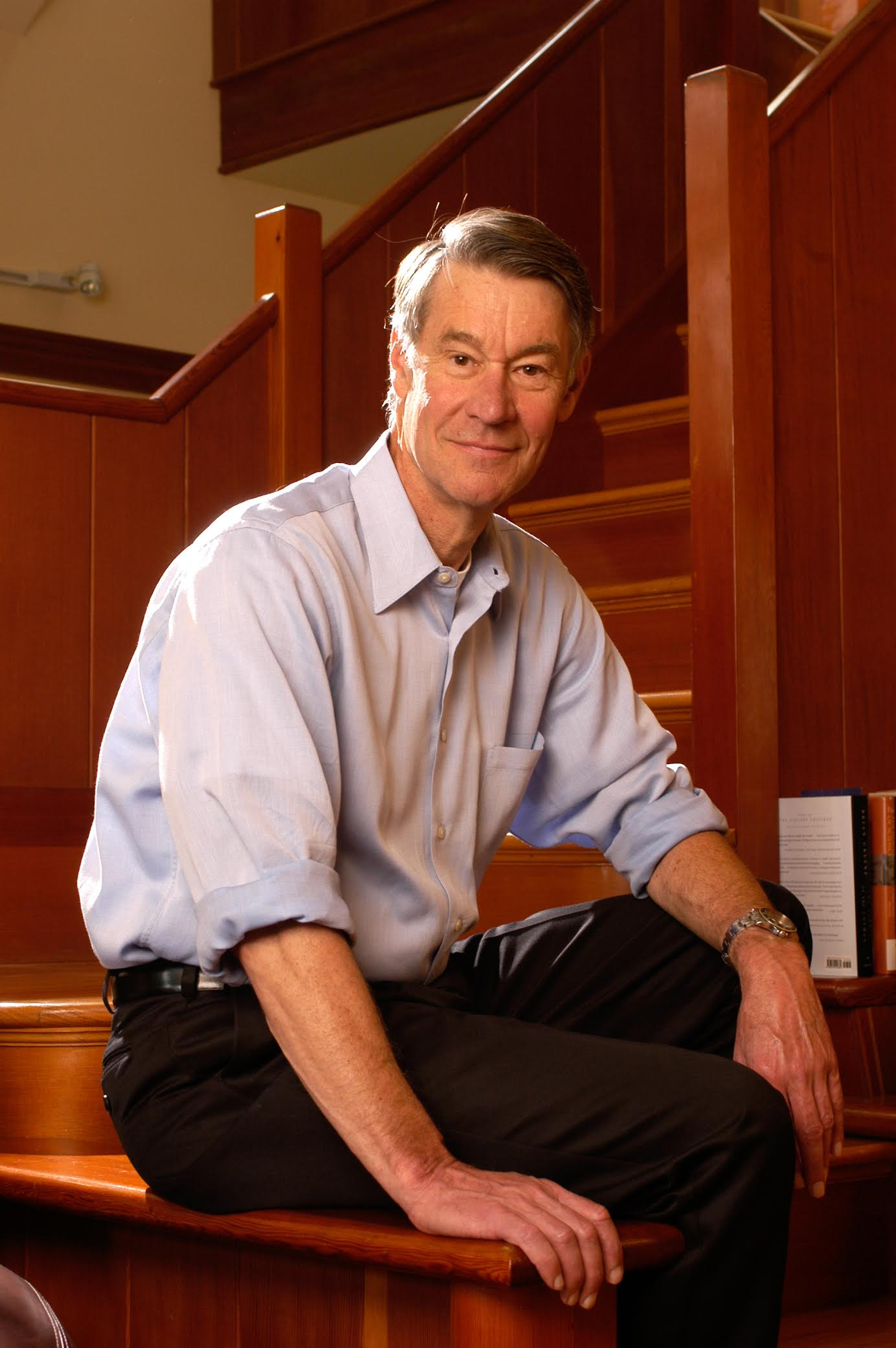
- Fuller in 2015

10th President of Oberlin College
- In office 1970 – 1974
- Preceded by: Robert K. Carr
- Succeeded by: Emil Danenberg

Personal details
- Born: October 26, 1936 Summit, New Jersey, U.S.
- Died: July 15, 2025 (aged 88) Berkeley, California, U.S.
- Spouse(s): Claire Sheridan; Alia Johnson; Ann Lackritz
- Education: Oberlin College (undergraduate); Princeton University (PhD)
- Profession: Physicist, author, social activist
- Website: Robert Works Fuller

Robert Works Fuller (October 26, 1936 – July 15, 2025) was an American physicist, educator and social reformer. He was president of Oberlin College 1970–1974, where he championed diversity and curricular reform. He then worked for citizen diplomacy during the Cold War, helped found the Hunger Project, which worked to end world hunger, travelled and wrote widely advocating societies free from "Rankism", rank-based discrimination.

Fuller was a Fellow of the World Academy of Arts and Sciences.

== Early life and career ==
Fuller was born in Summit, New Jersey, on October 26, 1936, the son of Willmine Works Fuller and physical chemist Calvin Souther Fuller, the co-inventor of the solar battery. He enrolled in Oberlin at the age of fifteen, and, when he had taken all the available courses in physics, left after three years to enter Princeton University, where he was a friend and collaborator of John Archibald Wheeler, and protégé of neurologist Peter Putnam. He did graduate study there from 1955 to 1957, at the École normale supérieure in Paris, a year at the University of Chicago in economics, before returning to Princeton for an M.A., receiving his Ph.D. in physics in 1959. In that year he married Ann Lackritz.

He taught at Columbia University as an assistant professor (1965–66), where he co-authored the book Mathematics of Classical and Quantum Physics. In the following years he did research at the Center for Advanced Studies at Wesleyan University and Teachers College of Columbia University. At the Battelle Seattle Research Center Seattle, Washington, he worked on support programs for school drop-outs and students who did not live up to their potential.

== Trinity College ==
Fuller was Dean of the Faculty and Professor of Physics at Trinity College in Hartford, Connecticut from 1968 to 1970, at that time an all-male school. Among his responsibilities were opening admission and integration of women students and making the college attractive to minority students. When Fuller announced his resignation in May 1970, President Lockwood said the college had "benefitted immeasurably from Dr, Fuller’s wisdom, ability, and energy", and the campus newspaper called Fuller "perhaps the most articulate spokesman for many of the College’s recent innovations", such as coeducation, the new curriculum, the judicial system, and praised his "willingness to innovate on a campus with a conservative faculty and a history of uninspired mediocrity".

== Oberlin College president ==
The mounting social unrest of the 1960s, and Fuller's commitment to educational reform led Oberlin College in 1970, to make him its tenth president, succeeding Robert K. Carr. At age 33 Fuller became one of the youngest college presidents in the country. His Oberlin presidency was a turbulent time on campus and in higher education generally. He told a reporter that Oberlin was outstanding because "it was founded by a bunch of Christians who took literally from the Bible certain dictums which said that all people are created equal and therefor you couldn’t not have women and you couldn’t not have Blacks." The faculty, he continued, is "politically and socially very liberal", but needs "a greater tolerance for experimentation". The curriculum had not changed in twenty years, he added. The faculty ran the internal affairs of the college, and students and administration had no say in a lot of things, which tended to perpetuate the status quo.

=== Structural reform and student life ===
Fuller established a Education Commission made up of faculty, administration, and students to consider basic structural change in the curriculum and calendar. The Commission recommended a new calendar of four 7-week sessions, six for course work and the seventh for evaluation and counselling. The proposed schedule would permit students to study two subjects instead of four, allow two additional sessions and create year-round operation. The year-round operation would lead to an increase in the size of the student body and faculty. Among the other recommendations were a high ratio of students to faculty in some areas in order to allow a low ratio in others; a series of lectures for large student audiences, for which only a light amount of reading woud be required, encouraging students to take courses in a wider range of topics; an increase in independent work; decreasing requirements and increasing student responsibility, that is, to drop requirements as to subject matter, language, physical education, and departmental major.

The college drew national attention for offering the option of co-ed dorms. Life Magazine ran a cover story in November 1970 that called the co-ed dorms a "marked success". Fuller told the magazine "we operate on good old American basic: the majority of students rule and determine their own life style."

=== Women and minority programs ===
Fuller also established a Commission on the Status of Women, tripled the enrollment of minorities, and increased support for the African Studies program started under President Carr.

=== Arts ===
Although the Conservatory was strong, Oberlin had not emphasized theater. Fuller recruited Herbert Blau to head the Inter-Arts Program, which included the actor Bill Irwin and the director Julie Taymor. He encouraged The Oberlin Dance Collective.

=== Sports: The "Oberlin Experiment" ===
In what has been called the "Oberlin Experiment", he recruited and hired Jack Scott, activist and writer on the sociology of sports, as chairman of the physical education department and athletic director. Scott, in turn, recruited and hired the first four African-American athletic coaches at a predominantly white American college or university, including Tommie Smith, Gold Medalist sprinter from the 1968 Summer Olympics in Mexico City, and a woman for women's sports. Scott and Fuller were interviewed on campus by Howard Cosell and appeared on primetime television to talk about these changes they were seeking. Fuller supported Scott's moves to make sports more democratic and part of college life. To help eliminate the distinction between so-called major and minor sports, he did away with admission charges to all Oberlin sporting events and gave team members power over the selection of coaches and their training rules.

=== Resignation ===
In November 1973, Fuller informed the Board of his resignation, to be effective February 2, 1974, making his tenure the shortest of any Oberlin president. He told local media that he had "achieved what I was asked to do". He listed cultural diversity and increased opportunities for women as major achievements during his tenure. Many changes had taken place in the curriculum, system of evaluation, and flow between the College and the Conservatory, but the dispute over governance made further progress difficult.

He was succeeded by Emil C. Danenberg, dean of the Conservatory. In 2019, the Oberlin Review looked back and quoted a faculty member who said Fuller's brief tenure was so unnerving that the college "spent the next decade quietly knitting itself together". However, the Review added, "while many faculty felt threatened by what they viewed as administrative overreach, not all faculty members opposed Fuller" and many students saw merit in his proposals.

== Ventures in social reform ==
Fuller had a longstanding interest in social and economic reform. In 1971 on a visit to India, Fuller had witnessed the famine caused by war with Pakistan; the war was a catalyst for the emergence of Bangladesh as an independent nation. With the election in the United States of President Jimmy Carter, he began a campaign to persuade the new leader to end world hunger. In 1977, Fuller joined Werner Erhard and singer John Denver in forming The Hunger Project, which worked to generate a consensus on ending world hunger. His June 1977 meeting with Carter in the Oval Office helped lead to the establishment of the Presidential Commission on World Hunger.

During the 1970s and 1980s, Fuller traveled frequently to the Soviet Union, working as a citizen-scientist to improve superpower relations during the Cold War. This led to the creation of the Mo Tzu Project, a group of citizen-diplomats traveling the world seeking citizen-to-citizen understanding to create sustainable peace. His frequent travel partner, Robert Cabot, funded these travels and became his patron for some fifteen years. Fuller also participated in the creation of the nonprofit global corporation Internews, which promoted democracy via free and independent media. Fuller served as its chairman, working with Kim Spencer, David M. Hoffman and Evelyn Messinger (founders of Internews), Alia Johnson, Robert Cabot, and John Steiner, among others. In 1982, Fuller appeared in the PBS documentary Thinking Twice About Nuclear War.

With the collapse of the USSR, Fuller's turn as a citizen-diplomat came to a close. Reflecting on the different roles he had played, he came to understand that he had, at various times, enjoyed the status of a "somebody" while at other times he had embraced the position of a "nobody". His experiences in "Nobodyland" led him to identify rankism—a term he coined, and defined as the abuse of the power inherent in rank.

In 2003, Fuller published Somebodies and Nobodies: Overcoming the Abuse of Rank (New Society Publishers). The book led a group in Virginia to set up the Dignitarian Foundation. He published a sequel that focused on building a dignitarian society, titled All Rise: Somebodies, Nobodies, and the Politics of Dignity (Berrett-Koehler, 2006). The concept of the "politics of dignity" builds on his broader analysis of rankism, arguing that many contemporary conflicts—whether in workplaces, families, institutions, or nations—stem less from material deprivation than from systematic violations of personal dignity. A politics of dignity, in Fuller’s account, seeks to reform institutions so that authority is exercised without humiliation, enabling individuals to participate without fear of being demeaned or rendered invisible. Ultimately, he envisions a civic order in which recognition, respect, and protection from rank-based discrimination form the basis of a more just and stable society. In 2008, Fuller and co-author Pamela A. Gerloff released an 86-page "action-oriented guide" titled Dignity for All: How to Create a World Without Rankism.

Fuller frequently spoke at universities, conferences, and social policy organizations. Notable engagements include:

- National Conference on Dignity for All, Dhaka, Bangladesh
- World Academy of Arts and Sciences
- Institute for Social and Economic Change, Bangalore, India
- Center for Therapeutic Justice, Williamsburg, Virginia
- National Association of Graduate-Professional Students (Keynote Speaker)
- Haas Institute for a Fair and Inclusive Society, Berkeley, CA
- Berkeley Carroll School (Visiting Writers Program)
- Microsoft Corporation, Redmond, Washington
- Royal Melbourne Institute of Technology, Australia
- Maison des Sciences de l’Homme, Paris
- National Headquarters of the United Methodist Church, Washington, D.C.
- Harvard, Stanford, Yale, and Princeton universities

Fuller maintained a blog at the Breaking Ranks website, and he also wrote regular articles for The Huffington Post and Psychology Today.

He explored the concepts of dignity and of dignitarian governance in his The Rowan Tree: A Novel (2013).

== Personal life and death ==
Fuller lived in Berkeley, California, with his wife, Claire Sheridan. He had been married to Ann Lackritz Fuller and later to Alia Johnson. He had four children and four grandchildren. Fuller died on July 15, 2025, at the age of 88.

== Works ==
=== Books ===
- with Frederick Byron Jr., Mathematics of Classical and Quantum Physics (Addison-Wesley, 1969, reprint Dover).
- with Zara Wallace,A Look at EST in EducationErhard Seminars Training (1975).
- Somebodies and Nobodies: Overcoming the Abuse of Rank. New Society Publishers (2003).
- All Rise: Somebodies, Nobodies, and the Politics of Dignity, sequel to Somebodies and Nobodies. Berrett-Koehler Publishers (2006).
- with Pamela Gerloff,Dignity for All: How to Create a World Without Rankism, Berrett-Koehler Publishers (2008).
- Religion and Science: A Beautiful Friendship? (2012)
- Genomes, Menomes, Wenomes: Neuroscience and Human Dignity (2013)
- The Rowan Tree: A Novel (2013)
- Belonging A memoir.
- The Wisdom of Science (2014)
- The Theory of Everybody (2014)
- Theo the White Squirrel (2016)
- Questions and Quests: A Short Book of Aphorisms (2016)

=== Selected articles ===
==== Scientific ====
- Effect of a Composition Dependent Surface Tension upon the Masses and Stability of Heavy Nuclei, With R. Brandt, F. G. Werner, M. Wakano and J. A. Wheeler. Proc. of International Conference on Nuclidic Masses, Hamilton, (1960).
- Dependence on Neutron Production in Fission on Rate of Change of Nuclear Potential (Thesis with John A. Wheeler), Physical Review 126, 684 (1962).
- Causality and Multiply Connected Space-Time, with John A. Wheeler, Physical Review 128, 919 (1962).
- S-Matrix Solution for the Forced Harmonic Oscillator, with S. M. Harris and E. L. Slaggie. American Journal of Physics 31, 431 (1963).

==== Oberlin reform ====
- ——— (November 1970). "A Task For Oberlin: Reformulate the Concept of a Liberal Arts College". Oberlin Alumni Magazine. 66: 4–8.
- ——— (October 1971). "'A Year of Decisions". Oberlin Alumni Magazine. 67 (7): 4–8.

==== Other topics ====
- On the Origin of Order in Behavior, General Systems, Vol. XI, pp. 99–112 (1966) MHRI, Univ. of Michigan (co-authored with Peter Putnam)
- Causal and Moral Law—Their Relationship as Examined in Terms of a Model of the Brain, Center for Advanced Studies, Wesleyan University, Monday Evening Papers: # 13 (1967) (On Peter Putnam's work.)
- On Educating Model-Builders, Publication of the 18th Symposium of the Conference on Science, Philosophy, and Religion, Jewish Theological Seminary, (1968)
- Project Rebound: A Science Course of Near-Drop-outs, Science Education News (AAAS) Nov. 1969.
- Polar Bears, Walrus Hides, and Social Solidarity, The Alaska Journal, Vol. 3, No. 2; Spring, 1973 (with Sergei Bogojavlensky).
- Inflation: The Rising Cost of Living on a Small Planet, Worldwatch Paper, No. 34, Fall 1979.
- Inflation on a Small Planet, Economic Impact, 1980, No. 3.
- Inflation as a World Problem, Cry California, 1980, Summer
- Our Enemies, Our Selves, CoEvolution Quarterly, Spring 1980.
- A Better Game Than War, Evolutionary Blues, 1983. The Utne Reader Vol. 1, No. 1, Feb. 1984; Reprinted in The Peace Catalog, Press for Peace, Seattle, WA.; and in Citizen Summitry: Keeping the Peace when it Matters Too Much to be Left to Politicians, J. Tarcher, L.A., and St. Martin's, N.Y.C., 1986.
- Motzu in Kenya and Poland, CoEvolution Quarterly, Spring 1983.
- Motzuing: Notes on Discussions Regarding Nuclear Winter and Space Bridges with Chinese and Soviet Scientists, Whole Earth Review, May, 1985.
- We Are All Afrikaners, Annals of Earth, Vol. IV, #2, 1986. Reprinted in In Context, No. 14, Autumn 1986.
- AmerRuss, Whole Earth Review, Winter 1986; updated, as One World Scenario, Whole Earth Review, Fall 1990.
- Proposal for a World Peace Corps, included in the anthology Securing our Planet: How to Succeed When Threats Are Too Risky and There's Really No Defense, J. Tarcher, L.A., and St. Martin's, N.Y.C., 1986.
- The Asian Vortex, (with Robert Cabot), Harvard Magazine, November 1987. Reprinted in Resurgence, March–April 1988, Issue 127.
- Chasing Our Shadow, New Age Journal, Jan. 1988; Interview by David Hoffman.
- From Physics to Peace, included in the anthology At the Leading Edge, edited by Michael Toms, Larson Publications, Burdett, N.Y., 1991.
- Empire's End, Russia's Rebirth, (with Robert Cabot), Harvard Magazine, May–June, 1991, Volume 93, No. 5. (Also published in Annals of Earth, May, 1991.) Also, Should We Help Russia?, Harvard Magazine, (October, 1991).
- A description of citizen diplomacy, which includes a description of the "Mo Tzu Project", may be found in the book Multi-Track Diplomacy: A Systems Guide and Analysis, by Louise Diamond and John McDonald, Iowa Peace Institute (1991).
- The Future of Equality, The Deeper News, A Global Business Network Publication, Volume 4, Number 1, February 1993.
- Section in All of Us: Americans Talk About the Meaning of Death, Edited by Patricia Anderson, Delacorte Press, N. Y., N. Y. (1996), pp. 323–327.
- Something America and China Could Do Together, China Digital Times, May 6, 2013.
- A Moral Dilemma for Academia: Dignity for Adjuncts, The Huffington Post, February 6, 2014.
- Reasons You Can't Win (And 3 Reasons You Can Anyway), The Huffington Post, January 16, 2015.
- A New Default Self, The Huffington Post, January 28, 2015.
- ——— (July 10, 2025). "Finding Famed Physicist John Wheeler". Princeton Alumni Weekly.

== Sources ==
- Salamon, Julie (July 10, 2004). "Tilting at Windbags: A Crusade Against Rank". New York Times. p. Arts and Ideas.
- Family of Robert W. Fuller (July 22, 2025), "Remembering Robert W. Fuller, physicist, president of Oberlin College, citizen diplomat, author, dignity advocate", Berkeleyside
