= David M. Hoffman =

American media activist (born 1945)

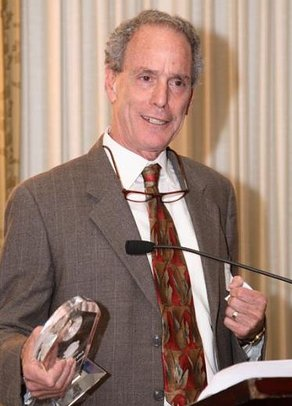
- Hoffman at the Internews Media Leadership Awards, 2009
- Born: David Michael Hoffman; January 18, 1945 (age 81); Baltimore, Maryland, U.S.
- Education: Johns Hopkins University; University of Colorado
- Occupation: Media activist
- Known for: International Media Development; Founder and President Emeritus, Internews; Founder and Chairman Emeritus, Global Forum for Media Development (GFMD)
- Awards: Emmy (1989), European Community Humanitarian Office (ECHO) TV and Radio Awards for Broadcast Commitment (1996)

David Michael Hoffman (born January 18, 1945) is an American author, political commentator, television project director and media activist.

He is the Founder and President Emeritus of Internews, a global non-profit organization supporting independent media and access to quality information worldwide. Experts of post-Soviet media "call Hoffman the nonprofit Ted Turner". He is also the Chairman Emeritus of the Global Forum for Media Development, a cross-sector initiative of more than 200 leading media assistance organisations from 70 countries that he spearheaded. He wrote the book Citizens Rising: Independent Journalism and the Spread of Democracy (2013) to tell the stories of the media development field and the activists who are playing a decisive role in political affairs across the globe.

Hoffman has written widely about media and democracy, the Internet, and the importance of supporting pluralistic, local media around the world. His articles have appeared in The New York Times, Foreign Affairs, The Washington Post, The Wall Street Journal, International Herald Tribune, USA Today, The Huffington Post, and the San Francisco Chronicle.

He has also testified before US House and Senate committees on issues of press freedom and access to information.

Hoffman won an Emmy award as project director for the television series Capital-to-Capital that ran from 1987 to 1990. It was produced in association with ABC News and Soviet Central Television moderated by Peter Jennings and Leonid Zolatarevsky.

== Education and early career ==
Hoffman is the son of Jerry and Naomi Hoffman.

His maternal grandparents immigrated from Odessa, Russian Empire, in 1905 and his maternal grandparents immigrated from Poland also in the early 1900s. He was born in Baltimore, Maryland, and grew up there. He graduated from Baltimore City College (high school) in 1962, received a Bachelor of Arts degree from Johns Hopkins University in 1966 and did his graduate studies in the social and political history of the United States at the University of Colorado, writing a doctoral dissertation on A History of Revolutionary Thought in America: 1877–1919. Hoffman played lacrosse and basketball for City College Knights and Johns Hopkins Blue Jays.

Hoffman was the founder and co-director of Survival Summer, a coalition of 140 national peace and disarmament groups that helped launch the anti-nuclear war movement of 1980. Prior to that, he was California Area Director of the American Federation of State, County and Municipal Employees (AFSCME).

During 1980–1982 Hoffman was the editor of Evolutionary Blues, a journal of political thought on international conflict, the threat of nuclear war, and US-Soviet relations.

== Professional career ==
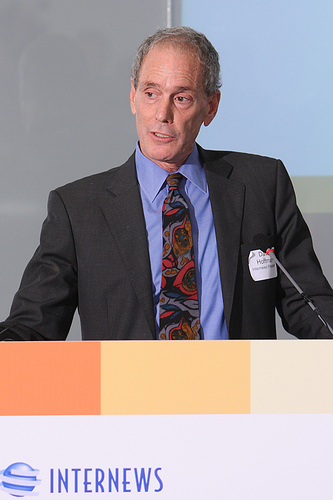
David M. Hoffman at the Internews Media Leadership Awards, 2007

Hoffman is Founder and President Emeritus of Internews, a global non-profit organization that fosters independent media and access to information worldwide. Internews was founded by Hoffman in 1982 with partners Kim Spencer and Evelyn Messinger. Hoffman led Internews for its first 30 years.

Building on the groundbreaking US-Soviet spacebridges developed by Kim Spencer and Evelyn Messinger, Hoffman organized a series of seven satellite television exchanges between leaders of the US Congress and their counterparts on the Supreme Soviet. Produced in association with ABC News and Gosteleradio, the Capital-to-Capital live broadcasts lasted from 1987 to 1990 with each program reaching audiences of 200 million people. Hoffman and the members of Congress who helped organize the series were recognized with an Emmy Award. The programs were moderated by Peter Jennings and Leonid Zolatarevsky.

In 1995 Hoffman co-founded Internews Europe with Kim Spencer, Patrice Barrat and Jeanne Girardot. The following year at Chateau du Vert Bosc in Normandy, France, he helped create Internews International, an association of autonomous Internews organizations and affiliated members including 11 Full Member Organizations and 19 Affiliated Members, with offices in 34 countries. Hoffman would go on to chair the board of Internews Europe after it moved its headquarters to London from 2014 to 2018, eventually handing over the role to the prominent British media lawyer Mark Stephens.

When the International Tribunal for the former Yugoslavia (ICTY) opened with the trial of Dusko Tadic on May 7, 1996, Hoffman organized live broadcasts of the proceedings that were transmitted by satellite and rebroadcast on all five commercial television channels in Bosnia and Herzegovina as well as on the state channel, BiH TV, completely blanketing the airwaves 11 hours a day. The live coverage was also distributed on satellite television channels in Croatia and Serbia.

The following year, 1997, when the International Criminal Tribunal for Rwanda (ICTR) opened in Arusha, Tanzania, Hoffman organized the only filming of the proceedings. Internews showed monthly edited versions of the genocide trials in village meetings and prisons throughout Rwanda. Questions and comments were taped and shown to the judges and prosecutors at the court in Arusha and their responses were relayed back in further town hall events, creating a rudimentary, but effective, feedback loop. The Rwanda project was led by Wanda Hall.

Hoffman developed and raised the first funding for the Global Internet Policy Initiative (GIPI), a network of non-profit, non-governmental organizations supporting adoption in developing and transitional countries of the legal and policy framework for an open and democratic Internet.

In 2000 Hoffman was one of the founders of Link TV and secured its initial funding. Link TV is a non-commercial direct-to-home satellite television channel that provides a unique perspective on international news, current events, and diverse cultures, presenting issues not often covered in the US media. It is carried on DirecTV and the Dish networks.

Recognizing that local media are the most effective source for communicating sensitive public health issues, Hoffman initiated Internews' efforts to train local journalists in their coverage of HIV/AIDS and other critical public health issues and produce television, radio and print articles. Over a thousand journalists have been trained in Africa and Asia.

Hoffman and Jane Safly Rogers collaborated to launch the Earth Journalism Network (EJN) to empower and enable journalists from developing countries to cover the environment more effectively. Under the leadership of its Executive Director James Fahn, EJN has trained thousands of journalists to cover many environmental concerns including climate change, biodiversity, water, environment health, and oceans and coastal resources.

In June 2003 the Athens Media Framework created a draft of democratic media laws that were later fully adopted by post-war Iraq. Hoffman envisioned the Framework and raised the funding to bring 80 media experts from around the world together for this unprecedented effort. The draft legislation they produced, coordinated by George Papagiannis, guaranteed media freedom and the abolition of censorship. Other recommendations included a plan for developing journalistic ethics, an internet policy and the creation of an independent public broadcasting authority in Iraq.

Hoffman was instrumental in creating Internews' emergency response capabilities for responding to humanitarian disasters and secured its initial funding. Specially trained journalists worked with surviving local media to provide life saving information during relief efforts in Aceh and Sri Lanka after the 2004 Indian Ocean tsunami, Haiti following the January 2010 earthquake, the Philippines in 2013 following Typhoon Haiyan among other humanitarian crisis. Other humanitarian interventions have established radio stations for refugee populations fleeing fighting from Darfur, Sudan, Somalia, Syria and other conflicts. In January 2010 Hoffman assisted the formation of CDAC (Communicating with Disaster Affected Communities), headquartered in London, that coordinates emergency media response actions of BBC Media Action, CARE, the UN and other humanitarian and media development organizations.

Hoffman was Founder and the first Chairman of the Global Forum for Media Development (GFMD). Launched in 2005 in Amman, Jordan, it brought together the media development sector for the first time. GFMD is a practitioner-led process open to all sides of the community involved in media development around the world, with a mission to make media development an integral part of overall development strategies. He currently serves as Chairman Emeritus.

== Awards ==
- 1996, TV and Radio Award for Broadcast Commitment from ECHO (European Commission) otherwise known as the European Community Humanitarian Office (ECHO)
- 1989, Emmy Award for Capital to Capital, a series of live debates on ABC between the U.S. Congress and the USSR Supreme Soviet

== Publications ==
- Citizens Rising: Independent Journalism and the Spread of Democracy, CUNY Graduate School of Journalism Press (2013) (Book)
