= Associations of environmental journalists =

Around the world, journalists who report on environmental problems such as deforestation, pollution and climate change, are forming networks and associations. The largest of these—the Society of Environmental Journalists in the United States—was formed in 1990 and has over 1400 members. Since then, journalists have formed new networks in Africa, Asia and other regions. These activities that these groups undertake include training programmes, advice to journalists, and advocacy to raise the prominence of environmental topics in the media. In Africa and Asia, these networks also act to raise funds to support better quality reporting on environmental issues. James Fahn, director of the Earth Journalism Network, notes however that donors generally seem less willing to support these journalism associations than they do environmental advocacy groups.

Networks of environment journalists are able to work in ways that would be impossible for individual reporters. The Philippine Network of Environmental Journalists has, for instance, built an SMS-based news service that connects hyperlocal reports on environmental issues and disaster events to a national audience. The project included the development of a new website and trainings held with local journalists and their audiences.

Another way that such networks have acted is to protest the dangers that environmental journalists face because their reporting challenges powerful elites. In September 2012, the Earth Journalism Network and the Society of Environmental Journalists circulated a joint petition calling on the Cambodian government to launch a full investigation into the murder of environmental journalist Hang Serei Oudom.

== Global networks and associations ==
- Earth Journalism Network
- The Society of Environmental Authors and Journalists https://environmentalwriters.org

== Africa: regional and continent-wide associations ==
- African Federation of Science Journalists
- African Network of Environmental Journalists
- Network of Climate Journalists in the Greater Horn of Africa
- Pan-African Media Alliance on Climate Change

== Africa: national associations ==
- Benin: Association des Journalistes et Communicateurs Scientifiques du Benin
- Burkina Faso: Association des Journalistes et Communicateurs scientifiques du Burkina Faso
- Cameroon: SciLife—Cameroon's Association of Science Journalists and Communicators
- Democratic Republic of Congo: Réseau National des Journalistes Congolais Pour l'Environnement
- Ethiopia: Ethiopian Environment Journalists Association
- Mozambique: Rede de Jornalistas Ambientais de Mozambique
- Niger: Association des Journalistes Scientifiques du Niger
- Nigeria: Nigeria Association of Science Journalists
- Rwanda: Rwanda Association of Science Journalists
- Sierra Leone: Federation of Environmental Journalists in Sierra Leone
- Sierra Leone: The Sierra Leone Environmental Journalists Association
- Sierra Leone: Union of Environmental Journalists
- South Africa: South African Science Journalists’ Association
- Sudan: Sudanese Environmental Journalists Association
- Sudan: Sudanese Society for Scientists and Environmental Journalists
- Tanzania: Journalists Environmental Association of Tanzania
- Togo: Science Journalists and Communicators of Togo
- Tunisia: Tunisia Environment Reporting Network
- Uganda: Uganda Science Journalists' Association
- Zambia: African Network of Environmental Journalists - Zambia Chapter
- Zimbabwe: Zimbabwe Environmental Journalists Association

== Asia: national associations ==
- Indonesia: Society of Indonesian Environmental Journalists
- Pakistan: National Council of Environmental Journalists
- Pakistan: Environmental Journalists Association of Pakistan (EJAP)
- Pakistan: Pakistan Environmental Journalists
- Philippines: Philippine Network of Environmental Journalists
