= CJ Platform =

News agency in Myanmar

- Industry: News agency
- Founded: 2022; 4 years ago
- Founder: Min Thu Win Htut
- Headquarters: Thailand–Myanmar border
- Area served: Myanmar

CJ Platform (short for Burma Citizen Journalist Platform) is a Myanmar-focused media organization based on the Thailand–Myanmar border. Founded in 2022 following the 2021 Myanmar coup d'état, it reports on developments in Myanmar and provides training for citizen journalists. In 2025, it was one of five Asia-Pacific media organizations selected for an Earth Journalism Network grant supporting reporting on environmental damage linked to war in Myanmar. As an exile-based media organization relying on the funding of USAID, CJ Platform was affected by the suspension of most U.S. foreign aid under Trump administration.

== See also ==
- Media in Myanmar
- Citizen journalism
