= Danenberg =

Danenberg is a surname. Notable people with the surname include:

- Emil C. Danenberg (1917–1982), American musician
- Sophia Danenberg (born 1972), American mountain climber
