= Messinger =

Messinger is a surname of Germanic origin. Notable people with the name include:

- Alida Rockefeller Messinger (born 1948), American philanthropist; daughter of John D. Rockefeller III
- Dominic Messinger (contemporary), American composer of soap-opera music
- Evelyn Messinger (contemporary), American journalist and media activist
- Gertrude Messinger (1911–95), American actress 1930s–1950s
- Jonathan Messinger (contemporary), American author and editor
- Ruth Messinger (born 1940), American politician from New York City; unsuccessful candidate for Mayor of New York 1997
- Rama Messinger (1968–2015), Israeli actress and singer
