= Carmen Twillie =

Carmen Twillie may refer to:

- Carmen Twillie Ambar (born 1969), American academic, lawyer, politician
- Carmen Twillie (actress) (born 1950), American studio singer and actress
