= Southern Comfort: The Garden District of New Orleans, 1800-1900 =

Southern Comfort: The Garden District of New Orleans is a 1989 non-fiction book by S. Frederick Starr, published by MIT Press. It is about the architecture of the Garden District, New Orleans.

The book describes how the district was developed.

According to reviewer Richard Longstreth, at the time of the publication of this book, there had not been very much research into the book.

Later printings are from the Princeton Architectural Press.

== Background ==
The author used archives as source.

== Contents ==
Chapter 5 discusses the construction of antebellum buildings (buildings constructed before the American Civil War).

Chapter 9 describes the civil war period in the city.

The book includes photographs from Robert S. Brantley that are in black and white.

== Reception ==
Anne Rice, who reviewed the book, described it as "landmark piece of scholarship" that has a "economical and enjoyable style".

John Archer of the University of Minnesota wrote that the book is "valuable and overdue".

Longstreth overall praised the book as "an unusually vivid case study"; he argued the text covering the development and its factors as being done "with imagination and skill" and he praised the integration of the book's content, though he argued the portions about the architecture are "sometimes weaker."
