= Robert K. Carr =

American political scientist (1908–1979)

Robert Kenneth Carr

9th President of Oberlin College
- In office 1960 – November 1970
- Preceded by: William Stevenson
- Succeeded by: Robert W. Fuller

Personal details
- Born: February 15, 1908 Cleveland, Ohio, U.S.
- Died: February 21, 1979 (aged 71) Elyria, Ohio, U.S.
- Spouse: Olive Grabill Carr
- Children: Norman, Elliott, and Robert
- Education: Dartmouth College (BA); Harvard University (MA, PhD)
- Profession: scholar

Robert Kenneth Carr (February 15, 1908 – February 21, 1979) was an American scholar in the field of government/political science. His main area of interest and expertise was in the field of civil liberties/civil rights, and he did the bulk of his writing while on the faculty of Dartmouth College. Carr also served as the executive secretary of President Harry S. Truman's Committee on Civil Rights. He was the primary author of the committee's landmark report, "To Secure These Rights" (1947), which spotlighted the need for more rigorous federal enforcement of civil rights. He served as president of Oberlin College, Ohio, from 1960–1970.

== Biography ==
Carr was born and raised in Cleveland, Ohio, and graduated from Shaw High School. While in high school, he made a living by trapping. He went on to earn a bachelor's degree from Dartmouth College in 1929, and then did his graduate work at Harvard University, earning an M.A. in 1930 and a Ph.D. in 1935. While completing his doctoral studies, Carr taught at the University of Oklahoma Norman. He joined the department of government at Dartmouth in 1937 and remained there until 1960.

From 1957 to 1958, he served as the general secretary of the American Association of University Professors.

Carr served as the president of Oberlin College during a tumultuous period of student activism. Under his presidency, he increased the school's physical plant, with 15 new buildings completed. Under his leadership, student involvement in college affairs increased, with students serving on nearly all college committees as voting members (including the Board of Trustees). Despite these accomplishments, Carr clashed repeatedly with the students regarding issues related to the Vietnam War. He left office in 1969, with History professor Ellsworth C. Carlson taking over as acting President, and was forced to resign as President in November 1970, succeeded by the 33-year-old Oberlin & Princeton alumnus Robert W. Fuller.

== Bibliography ==
=== Author ===
- The Supreme Court and Judicial Review (1942)
- Federal Protection of Civil Rights (1947)
- The House Committee on Un-American Activities (1952)

=== Co-author ===
- American Democracy in Theory and Practice (1951, 1971) (Note: Carr was a mentor to and collaborator with Marver H. Bernstein, a professor of political science at Princeton who later became president of Brandeis University.)
- Civil Liberties Under Attack (1953)
- Foundations of Freedom (1958)
- Aspects of Liberty (1958)
