= Marvin Krislov =

American academic administrator and attorney

8th President of Pace University
- Incumbent
- Assumed office August 1, 2017
- Preceded by: Stephen J. Friedman

14th President of Oberlin College
- In office 2007–2017
- Preceded by: Nancy Dye
- Succeeded by: Carmen Twillie Ambar

Acting United States Solicitor of Labor
- In office 1997–1998
- President: Bill Clinton
- Preceded by: J. Davitt McAteer
- Succeeded by: Henry L. Solano

Personal details
- Born: August 24, 1960 (age 66) Lexington, Kentucky, U.S.
- Spouse: Amy Ruth Sheon (m. 1991; div. 2015)
- Education: Yale University (BA, JD); Magdalen College, Oxford
- Website: www.pace.edu/president

Marvin Krislov (born August 24, 1960) is the eighth and current president of Pace University in New York. Prior to his appointment at Pace, he served from 2007 to 2017 as the president of Oberlin College and nine years as the vice president and general counsel of the University of Michigan.

In 2027, he will be assume the role of President of Bard College for three years, replacing acting president Jonathan Becker.

== Biography ==
Krislov was born in Lexington, Kentucky, to a Jewish family in 1960.

Krislov graduated from Yale College in 1982 with a bachelor's degree in political science summa cum laude and winner of the Alpheus Henry Snow Prize. He attended Magdalen College, Oxford as a Rhodes scholar. He then returned to New Haven to attend Yale Law School, where he was an editor of the Yale Law Journal.

He began his law career as a clerk for Judge Marilyn Hall Patel of the U.S. District Court for the Northern District of California in San Francisco. From 1989 to 1993, he served in an honors program at the U.S. Department of Justice, prosecuting cases involving police brutality and racial violence. He then spent three years at the White House Counsel's office before moving to the U.S. Department of Labor, where he served as Acting Solicitor of Labor until leaving the office to become vice president and general counsel at the University of Michigan. In 1998, he became the first person to serve as both vice president and general counsel at the University of Michigan. As general counsel to the university, he dispensed legal services on matters ranging from defending affirmative action to appealing penalties levied against the Michigan Wolverines basketball team by the National Collegiate Athletic Association. Krislov led the defense of University of Michigan in Gratz vs Bollinger in which the United States Supreme Court upheld appeals and lower court findings that the university's admissions practices based on race were unconstitutional although upholding the concepts of affirmative action in admissions.

He is a member of a variety of academic service organizations, including the American Anthropological Association's Project Advisory Board on Race and Human Variation, the Michigan Rhodes Scholars Selection Committee, and the Executive Committee of the University of Michigan Institute for Labor and Industrial Relations. Krislov was appointed to the National Council on the Humanities at the National Endowment for the Humanities in November 2009.

Krislov's community service activities include leadership positions in the Washtenaw County Jewish Foundation and the United Way of Washtenaw County, as well as membership on boards of arts organizations including the Mosaic Youth Theatre of Detroit and the University Musical Society. He also served as an alderman in New Haven shortly after graduating from Yale.

== Family ==
He was married to Amy Ruth Sheon; they divorced in 2015. He has three children.

== Notable publications ==
- The Next Twenty-five Years: Affirmative Action in Higher Education in the United States and South Africa David L. Featherman, Martin Hall, and Marvin Krislov, editors. Forewords by: Mary Sue Coleman, President of the University of Michigan and Njabulo Ndebele, Former Vice-Chancellor and Principal of the University of Cape Town. University of Michigan Press, Ann Arbor, 2009.
