= Emil C. Danenberg =

Concert pianist, educator, President Oberlin College

Emil Danenberg

11th President of Oberlin College
- In office 1975 – 1982
- Preceded by: Robert W. Fuller
- Succeeded by: S. Frederick Starr

Personal details
- Born: July 30, 1917 British Hong Kong
- Died: January 16, 1982 (aged 64) Oberlin, Ohio, U.S.
- Spouse: Mary Ann Brezney
- Profession: Concert pianist, music educator

Emil Charles Danenberg (July 30, 1917 – January 16, 1982) was an American concert pianist and music educator in the field of classical music. He was Dean of the Oberlin Conservatory of Music 1970–1975, and president of Oberlin College from 1975 until his death in 1982. He was remembered as an administrator who chose to keep a low profile, seeking to build consensus" and as a "modest man" who was known for his encyclopedic knowledge of the performing arts, international cuisine, and the sports world."

== Early life and musical career ==
Danenberg was born in Hong Kong on 30 July 1917 to Emil F. X. Danenberg and Elsie Gardner. He began the study of piano with his father, a graduate of Leipzig Conservatory, and an exponent of the "Perfeld method" and teacher of piano in Hong Kong. In 1924, at the age of six, he gave a recital at the Lyceum in Shanghai. The North China Herald praised "the little fellow's dexterity," and called him the "Hong Kong prodigy." The family came to the United States when he was nine years old. He studied piano at University of California at Los Angeles, where a gymnastic accident fractured a vertebra; he chose to have the reconstructive surgery leave his upper back in a curved position that would allow him to reach the piano keyboard. He studied performing and composition with the modernist composer Arnold Schoenberg, and performed the premier of the composer's concerto. Among his classmates was Leon Kirchner After graduation in 1944 he taught at UCLA for two years as a teaching assistant before taking a position at Oberlin in 1944.

While at Oberlin he continued his concert career, touring as accompanist with the Metropolitan Opera basso Jerome Hines. The New York Times review welcomed his New York debut in 1950 as an "impressive program" of Bach, Bartok, and Ravel, followed by Schubert, saying "thoughtfulness and musicality marked the entire event." Among his return recitals was in 1976 with the New Hungarian Quartet, which was then in residency at Oberlin. Among his undergraduate piano students in the 1960s was Stanley Cowell, who became a distinguished jazz pianist. Cowell included "Emil Danenberg" in his 1973 piano suite "Musa: Ancestral Streams".

He married Mary Ann Brezney, also a pianist and music teacher, on June 23, 1951. She died April 24, 2008, at the age of 81.

== Dean of the Oberlin Conservatory ==
After serving for a year as Acting Dean, Danenberg became Dean of the Oberlin Conservatory of Music in July 1971. Danenberg fostered diversity and change as well as maintaining traditional strengths. One project, for instance, was the Baroque Performance Institute, started in 1972. Yet he also took the initiative to introduce jazz studies and ethnomusicology. In 1973 he invited jazz musician Wendell Logan to join the faculty; Logan went on to create a jazz department and establish jazz studies. Danenberg also created a post in gamelan, an Indonesian classical form.

== President of Oberlin College ==
Danenberg was chosen for five-year term and became the eleventh president of Oberlin College, April 7, 1975, and was reappointed April 1979. His appointment came after a fifteen-month search following the resignation of his predecessor Robert Works Fuller, who had proposed radical reforms and challenged faculty power. Danenberg had served on the Educational Commission, the Governance Commission, and the Committee to Review Minority Programs under Fuller, but as president he moved to reaffirm the strength of faculty governance.

In 1979, Danenberg launched the largest fund-raising program in the college's history. with the goal to shore up college finances, expand programs, increase faculty salaries, and add positions. Danenberg used the success of the drive to benefit the Inter-Arts program, the Upward Bound Program for educationally disadvantaged students. the Black Arts/Theater program, women's studies curriculum, and Special Services to Disadvantaged Students. Danenberg introduced an Affirmative Action Plan in 1976, noting that it was a reiteration of the College's commitment, but there continued to be controversy over the colleges treatment of Black students and faculty, however.

He died in Allen Memorial Hospital, Oberlin, at the age of 64 on January 16, 1982, from liver cancer.

Emil Danenberg Distinguished Artist Residence Fund in1981 and the Danenberg Oberlin-in-London Program in 1983 were established in his memory.
