= Carmen Twillie Ambar =

American academic (born 1968)

15th President of Oberlin College
- Incumbent
- Assumed office September 2017
- Preceded by: Marvin Krislov

13th President of Cedar Crest College
- In office August 2008 – August 2017
- Preceded by: Jill Leauber Sherman
- Succeeded by: Elizabeth M. Meade

9th Vice President and Dean of Douglass College
- In office 2002–2008

Personal details
- Born: Carmen Marie Twillie; July 3, 1968 (age 58) Little Rock, Arkansas, U.S.
- Spouse: Saladin Ambar (m. 1994; div. 2019)
- Children: 3
- Education: Georgetown University (BS); Princeton University (MPA); Columbia University (JD)

Carmen Twillie Ambar (born July 3, 1968) is an American lawyer and academic. She has been the president of Oberlin College since 2017.

== Early life and education ==
Ambar is a native of Little Rock, Arkansas. Her father Manuel Twillie picked cotton on a farm in Arkansas and became a school principal, and her mother Gwendolyn Brown Twillie earned a Ph.D. in dance at Texas Woman's University, leaving home for a year when her children were young. Her mother later chaired the Theatre and Dance Department at the University of Arkansas at Little Rock.

She holds a bachelor's degree in foreign service from the Edmund A. Walsh School of Foreign Service at Georgetown University, and earned both a master's degree in public affairs from the Princeton School of Public and International Affairs and a J.D. degree from Columbia Law School in 1994.

== Career ==
Ambar formerly served as board chair for the Public Leadership Education Network and was vice-chair of the New Jersey Commission on the Status of Women. She served as assistant dean at the Woodrow Wilson School of Public and International Affairs at Princeton University from 2000-2002. Ambar was appointed by Governor Corzine to the New Jersey Economic Development Authority Board of Directors in 2006.

In 2002, she became the ninth woman to lead Douglass College and the youngest dean in its history. A the time she noted she had aspirations to become a college president, and in 2008 was named thirteenth president of Cedar Crest College. During her tenure at Cedar Crest its endowment increased by 90%, with budget surpluses, increased enrollment and student retention. She also led initiatives that provided a study abroad experience for all sophomores and The 4-Year Guarantee which laid out a clear path for students to graduate.

On May 30, 2017, she was named fifteenth president of Oberlin College, the first black person and the second woman to hold that position.

== Personal life ==
From 1994 until 2019, she was married to Saladin Ambar, who is also a graduate of Edmund A. Walsh School at Georgetown University. She is the mother of triplets, born in 2007, all of whom attend Oberlin. She plays piano and enjoys professional baseball.
