= Nancy Dye =

American historian

Nancy Schrom Dye

13th President of Oberlin College
- In office July 1994 – June 30, 2007
- Preceded by: S. Frederick Starr
- Succeeded by: Marvin Krislov

Personal details
- Born: Nancy Schrom; March 11, 1947 Columbia, Missouri, U.S.
- Died: October 28, 2015 (aged 68) Lakewood, Ohio, U.S.
- Spouse: Griffith Dye
- Education: Vassar College (BA); University of Wisconsin–Madison (MS, PhD)

Nancy Dye (née Schrom; March 11, 1947 – October 28, 2015) was an American historian and philosopher and college academic who served as the first female president of Oberlin College in Oberlin, Ohio. As a professional historian, she was the author of numerous articles and several books, and she served on the editorial board of The Journal of American History.

== Biography ==
=== Early life and education ===
Nancy Schrom was born in Columbia, Missouri, in 1947. Both of her parents were college administrators. Her father served as dean of students at Miami University and Indiana University, and her mother worked as assistant to the dean of the New York University Law School.

She graduated from Vassar College, and would go on to earn a M.S. and Ph.D. from the University of Wisconsin–Madison.

=== Vassar ===
In 1988, she accepted a position at Vassar College, where she served as dean of the faculty as well as professor of history. She served as acting president of Vassar for several months in 1992.

=== President of Oberlin College ===
Dye became the 13th president of Oberlin College in July 1994, succeeding the embattled S. Frederick Starr. Oberlin's first female president, she oversaw the construction of new buildings, the increased selectiveness of the student body, and helped grow the endowment with the then-largest capital campaign in the college's history.

As president, Dye was known for her accessibility and inclusiveness. Especially in her first few years, she was a regular attendee at student events such as football games, concerts, and dorm parties.

On September 11, 2006, after serving as President of Oberlin College for 12 years, Dye announced her resignation effective June 30, 2007. Her resignation came after a period of transition for the college. Some were dissatisfied with Dye's communication with students and faculty, while others respected her ability to keep the college stable when other colleges were suffering financially. Her most recent biannual review was unreleased. Official reasons for the burial of the report are because of poor methodologies, although many suspect that it was due to a largely negative review.

In honor of her commitment to internationalism, the board of trustees announced the Nancy S. Dye chair for Middle Eastern and Islamic studies at Oberlin at commencement in May 2007. Dye was succeeded as Oberlin College president by Marvin Krislov in July 2007.

A 2009 article in the New York Times reported that Dye earned $1.4 million from Oberlin as its ex-president.

== Death ==
She died at her home in Lakewood, Ohio, on October 28, 2015, aged 68, from Lewy body dementia.

== Bibliography ==
- As Equals and As Sisters: Feminism, Trade Unionism, and the New York Women's Trade Union League (University of Missouri Press, 1980)
- (co-editor, with Noralee Frankel) Gender, Race, and Class in the Progressive Era (University Press of Kentucky, 1991)
