= President of Oberlin College =

- Incumbent; Carmen Twillie Ambar since 2017
- Type: President
- Formation: 1835
- First holder: Asa Mahan

The President of Oberlin College is the chief administrator of both Oberlin College and Oberlin Conservatory of Music. Each is appointed by and is responsible to the other members of that body, who delegate to him or her the day-to-day running of the university. The current incumbent is Carmen Twillie Ambar. As part of Oberlin's inherent mission of a vastly interdisciplinary education, presidents have been chosen from a wide range of fields as diverse as musical performance (Starr), theology (Finney) physics (Fuller), law (Krislov), athletics (Stevenson) and pure mathematics (King). Thus, each president is a qualified academic professor who has the opportunity to teach classes.

== Presidents of Oberlin College ==
The following persons have served as president of Oberlin College:

No.	Image	President	Term start	Term end	Refs.
acting		Henry Brown	1834	1834	
acting		John Keep	1834	1835	
1		Asa Mahan	1835	1850	
acting		Charles Grandison Finney	1849	1849	
acting		John Morgan	1850	1850	
2		Charles Grandison Finney (Note: Leader in the Second Great Awakening)	1851	1866	
acting		John Morgan	1859	1859	
3		James Fairchild	1866	1889	
acting		Frances Drake Parish	1871	1871	
acting		John Millott Ellis	1871	1871	
acting		Henry Martyn Tenney	1889	1891	
4		William Gay Ballantine	1891	1896	
acting		James Harris Fairchild	1896	1898	
5		John Henry Barrows	1899	June 3, 1902 (Note: Died in office.)	
acting		John Guiteau Welch Cowles	1902	1902	
6		Henry Churchill King	1902	1927	
acting		Henry Martyn Tenney	1909	1910	
acting		Edward Increase Bosworth	1918	1919	
7		Ernest H. Wilkins	1927	1946	
8		William Stevenson	1946	1960	
acting		William Blair Stewart	December 1952	March 1953	
acting		Donald Melbourne Love	June 1959	September 1959	
9		Robert K. Carr	1960	1969	
acting		Ellsworth Clayton Carlson	1969	1970	
10		Robert W. Fuller	1970	1974	
acting		Ellsworth Clayton Carlson	1974	1975	
11		Emil Danenberg	April 1975	January 16, 1982	
acting (Note: Powell was acting president while president Danenberg was in the hospital and after Danenberg's death.)		James Lawrence Powell	September 1981	July 1983	
12		S. Frederick Starr	July 1, 1983	June 30, 1994	
acting		Alfred F. MacKay	July 1991	February 1992	
13		Nancy Dye	July 1, 1994	June 30, 2007	
acting (Note: Acting president during Nancy Dye's 2000 sabbatical leave.)		Clayton R. Koppes	July 2000	December 2000	
14		Marvin Krislov	July 1, 2007	June 30, 2017 (Note: Resigned to lead Pace University.)	
acting		Clayton R. Koppes	July 1, 2017	August 31, 2017	
15		Carmen Twillie Ambar	September 1, 2017	present	

Table notes:
