= Pan-African Media Alliance on Climate Change =

The Pan-African Media Alliance for Climate Change (PAMACC) is one of Africa’s associations of environment journalists. It was created in June 2013 at a workshop the Pan African Climate Justice Alliance organised for African journalists.

PAMACC's aim is to support journalists to improve their reporting on climate change and has set up a website to share their stories.

It has regional coordinators, who will encourage journalists to set up national bodies in each country. The coordinator for Southern Africa, Sellina Nkowani from Malawi, has also stated that she wants the alliance to encourage more women journalists to report on climate change. The other regional coordinators are Elias Ngalame from Cameroon (for Central Africa), Atayi Babs Opaluwah from Nigeria (for West Africa) and Kizito Makoye from Tanzania (for East Africa). Isaiah Esipisu from Kenya will act as the continent-wide coordinator.

Some of the key activities and initiatives undertaken by PAMACC include:

1. PAMACC provides training and support to journalists and media organizations on how to report on climate change issues in a way that is accurate, engaging, and accessible to a wide audience.
2. PAMACC advocates for policies and actions that support climate change mitigation and adaptation in Africa, and engages with policymakers and other stakeholders to raise awareness about the urgency of the issue.
3. PAMACC runs media campaigns to raise awareness about climate change and its impacts on African communities, and to encourage action at the individual and community levels.
4. PAMACC works to build networks and partnerships among journalists, media organizations, civil society groups, and other stakeholders in order to amplify the impact of its activities and initiatives.
