= Jack Scott (sports activist) =

American sports activist (1942–2000)

- Born: March 3, 1942; Scranton, Pennsylvania, US
- Died: February 6, 2000 (aged 57); Oakland, California, US
- Education: Stanford University; Syracuse University (BA); UC Berkeley (PhD)
- Known for: sports activism
- Spouse: Micki Scott

Jack Scott (March 3, 1942 – February 6, 2000) was an American political activist known for his concern with exploitation of athletes and race relations in sport, the sociology of sport, his association with the Radical Sports Movement of the 1970s, and for involvement with Patty Hearst and fugitives of the Symbionese Liberation Army (SLA).

== Education ==
Scott grew up in Scranton, Pennsylvania, and played tight end on his high school football team. He graduated from Syracuse University in 1966, and studied at Stanford, where he was a competitive sprinter. There he met Beverly McGee, known as "Mickie," with whom he studied at Berkeley for graduate work. He later said that he started as a "Goldwater Republican," but was radicalized by a protest against the draft in which demonstrators were injured by police. He received a PhD in education from the University of California, Berkeley, specializing in the sociology of sport, which he essentially founded as a field of study.

== Critical views of sport and society ==
Inspired by the protest of Black athletes at the 1968 Mexico City Olympic games and Black sports activist Harry Edwards, Scott developed a critical view of American sports as "one of the most conservative, narrow and encrusted segments of our society". He attacked the "quasi-militaristic manner" of "racist, insensitive" coaches who robbed sport of its "best justification—that it's fun to do".

Scott criticized such figures as University of Alabama football coach Bear Bryant, Vince Lombardi and other "over-authoritarian coaches" who proved "that heavy discipline can produce winners", but added that "it is also possible to learn and develop in a more free and creative atmosphere". During the 1960s he served as sports editor of the left-wing San Francisco magazine, Ramparts.

He and Micki founded the Institute for the Study of Sport and Society in 1970. His book, The Athletic Revolution (1971), became "a required text on exploitation in athletics".

== The "Oberlin Experiment" ==
At the invitation of Robert Fuller, the newly inaugurated president of Oberlin College, Scott was appointed as Chairman of the Physical Education Dept. and Athletic Director, serving from 1972 to 1974. He instituted what has been called the "Oberlin Experiment". He set out to change college athletics radically, both by fostering inclusion and putting less emphasis on simply winning.

Among his new faculty were Paul Hoch, a critic of commercialized football known for his Marxian analysis of sport and author of Rip Off the Big Game (1972); and gymnast Dan Millman.

Scott also hired three Black coaches, who included Cass Jackson as head of the football program, who was the first black football coach at a non-black university; and Tommie Smith, world record holder in the 200-meter, as head track coach. Smith had caused controversy by raising his fist to show Black pride after winning a gold medal at the 1968 Olympic Games. Scott also hired a black basketball coach, and a woman to coach women's sports. All of these were unprecedented appointments. Although Jackson was criticized as unqualified, he led Oberlin in having its "first winning season for 25 years- the college has not had another since."

Scott attracted national attention; for instance, noted ABC Sports commentator Howard Cosell broadcast a description of the Oberlin program from the campus. Scott was criticized by some for being insensitive in handling the previous coaches and for his personal relations with the Oberlin faculty. Scott was forced out after the administration became more conservative. Oberlin never won another football season.

== National career ==
On returning to Berkeley in 1974, Scott became friends with NBA basketball star, Bill Walton. That same year, he and Micki moved into Walton's home in Portland, Oregon, where they lived together for two years before moving down the block. He wrote Bill Walton: On the road with the Portland Trail Blazers, published in 1978.

== Patty Hearst and later years ==
In 1974 He gave aid to Patty Hearst, the heiress wanted by law enforcement authorities after she was indicted for domestic terrorist attacks as a member of the Symbionese Liberation Army (SLA). He helped her travel to the East Coast and arranged a refuge for her and the Harris couple. He also helped them return to the West Coast.

Scott and Micki separated in the mid-1990s, after having had three children together, but renewed their relationship. Their children were a son, Jonah, and two daughters, Lydia and Emma.

The couple married in January 2000. Scott died at Micki's house in Eugene, OR later that year of throat cancer at the age of 57.
