= King–Crane Commission =

1919 inquiry on the post-WWI Ottoman Empire

Inter-Allied Commission on Mandates in Turkey
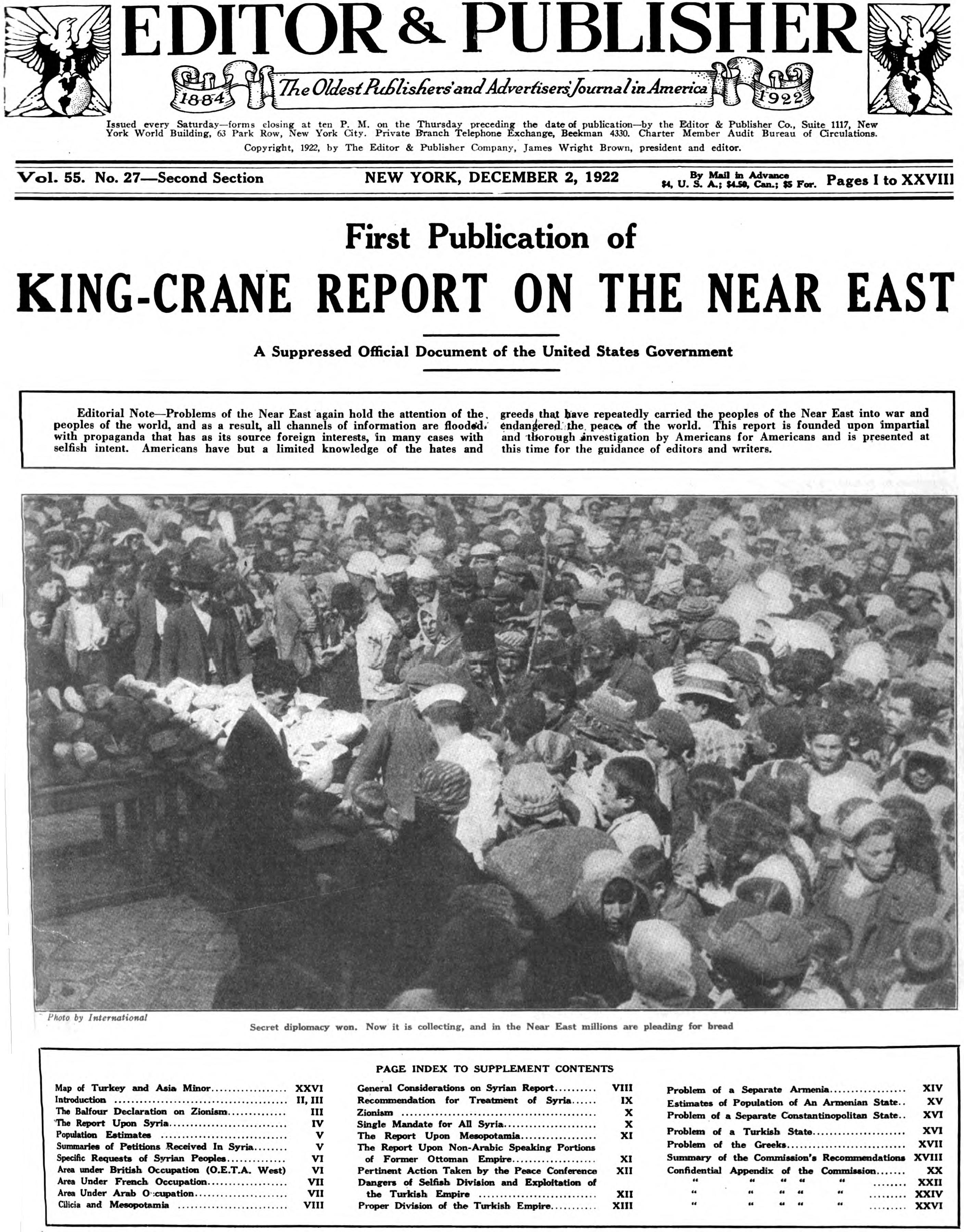
- The first publication of the report in Editor & Publisher magazine in December 1922. The publication was described as a "Suppressed Official Document of the United States Government."
- Created: 1919, but not published until 1922
- Author(s): Henry Churchill King and Charles R. Crane
- Purpose: Official investigation by the United States Government concerning the disposition of non-Turkish areas within the former Ottoman Empire.

The King–Crane Commission, officially called the 1919 Inter-Allied Commission on Mandates in Turkey, consisting primarily of an American delegation was a commission of inquiry concerning the disposition of areas within the former Ottoman Empire.

The Commission began as an outgrowth of the 1919 Paris Peace Conference. The Commission visited areas of Palestine, Syria, Lebanon, and Anatolia, surveyed local public opinion, and assessed its view on the best course of action for the region. Originally meant to be led by French, British, Italian, and American representatives, it ended as an investigation conducted solely by the United States government after the other countries withdrew to avoid the risk of being "confronted by recommendations from their own appointed delegates which might conflict with their policies".

Referring to the Allies' commitment to the principle of self-determination, the commission stated that any territorial settlements should reflect "the free acceptance" of "the people immediately concerned", rather "upon the basis of the material interest or advantage of any other nation or people which may desire a different settlement for the sake of its own exterior influence or mastery". It warned that existing diplomatic agreements and mandate plans were already shaping outcomes in ways that did not reflect the expressed preferences of local populations and recommended that "only a greatly reduced Zionist program be attempted by the Peace Conference, and even that, only very gradually initiated".

The Commission submitted its report to the Paris Peace Conference in August 1919. Its work was undercut from the beginning by France and the United Kingdom's pact, including the Sykes–Picot Agreement, and colonialist policy objectives, under which mandate arrangements and territorial divisions had largely already been decided through diplomatic negotiations before the report was completed. Although the report's recommendations was not adopted by the Paris Peace Conference, it has since been cited as an early documented survey of political opinion and a historical reference point in debates on self-determination and foreign intervention in the region.

== Context ==
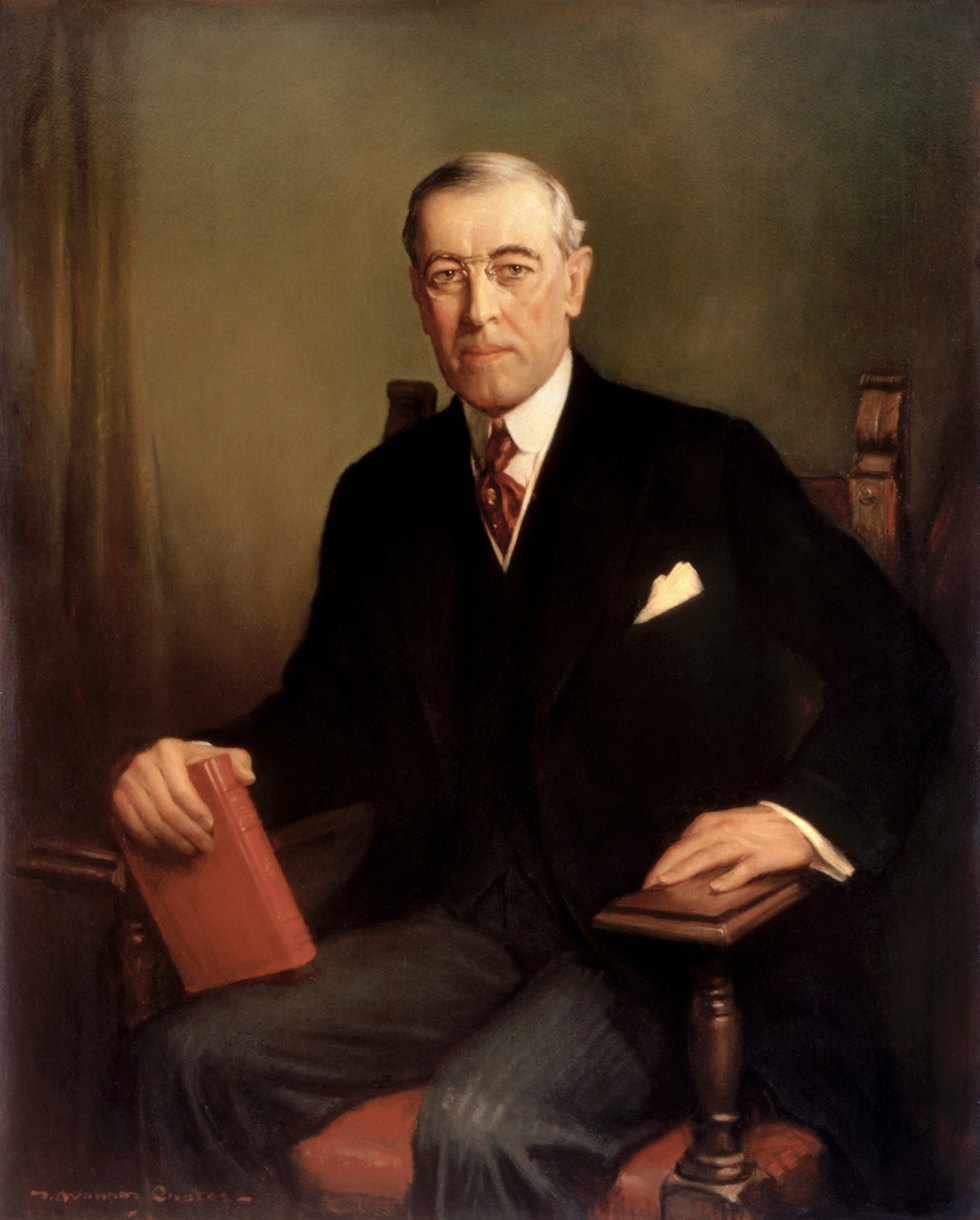
President Woodrow Wilson of the United States was an avowed opponent of secret diplomacy.

At the Paris Peace Conference, France and Britain sought to divide the Ottoman Empire among themselves using the mandate system while President Wilson sought to oppose such plans. The conference began in 1919. In the wake of World War I, the participants were exhausted and particularly interested in the fate of their imperial rival, the Ottoman Empire.

The French, in particular, had extensive claims in the Middle East. Since as early 1900, the French began to build relationships and claims on political, moral and economic grounds. They created a role for themselves as the traditional protector of Lebanese Christians. The French supported the Maronites in Lebanon with missionaries and schools, deepening their relationship with the Christian religious community. Many Lebanese Christians feared domination as a religious minority and vocally supported the French Mandate.

Finally, French capitalists controlled 63% of the Ottoman Public Debt. This economic tie made France concerned about the fate of the Ottoman Empire. The French were adamant that because of their unique relationship with Syria, they should be one of the nations to receive a mandate in Syria.

Meanwhile, after World War I, people in the Levant, including Palestine, sought independence due to the collapse of the Ottoman Empire and global revolutionary activities, namely, the “year of traveling revolutions” across the North Africa and the Middle East. They aimed to establish independent nation-states, inspired by President Wilson's emphasis on self-determination. The King–Crane Commission played a crucial role in evaluating their aspirations. Many had relied on Wilson's assurances of security and autonomy, expecting democratic principles to guide the postwar period. They hoped for Western support to achieve self-rule, marking the end of imperialism in the Middle East.

=== Secret negotiations ===
The French allied themselves with the British in order to press their claims. While the British did not have the same connection with the Middle East, they were still interested in expanding and defending their existing colonial empire. In what came to be known as the Sykes-Picot agreement, the French and the British agreed to divide the Middle East between the two of them after the war. When they reached the Paris Peace Conference, this agreement made negotiation on the Middle East nearly impossible. When American diplomats proposed the King–Crane Commission to investigate popular sentiment in the region of Syria, both French and British diplomats greeted it with public approval, but behind the scenes the outcome had already been decided.

The British also engaged in secret negotiations with the emir of Mecca in the Hussein-McMahon correspondence before the conference occurred. Ultimately, this would cause the British to fall into poor standing with the Arabs because they would betray Arab trust by conducting simultaneous negotiations in the Sykes-Picot agreement and the Balfour Declaration.

== The commission ==
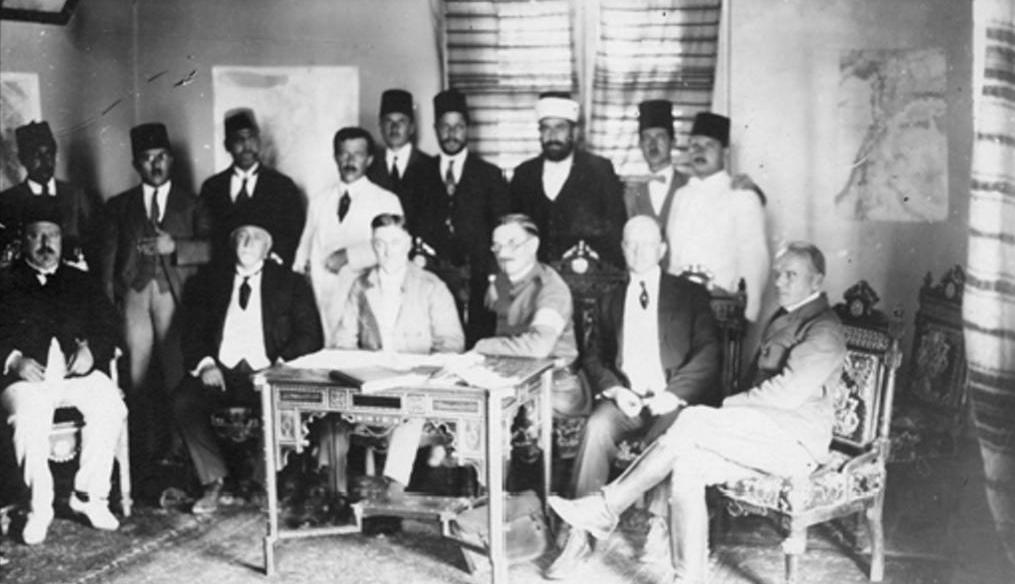
1919 Photo of the King–Crane Commission

The Commission was originally proposed by the United States as an international effort to assess ''the state of opinion there with regard to [the post-Ottoman Middle East], and the social, racial, and economic conditions.'' The plan received little support from the other nations, with many claimed delays. The Americans gradually realized that the British and French had already come to their own backroom deals about the future of the region, and new information could only muddy the waters. So, the United States alone sponsored the commission.

The Commission's representatives appointed by President Woodrow Wilson were Henry Churchill King, a theologian and fellow college president (of Oberlin College), and Charles R. Crane, a prominent Democratic Party contributor. The Commission also included historian Albert Lybyer and William Yale, who worked for the Standard Oil Company.

The dispatch of the Commission, combined with Wilson's claim that the “nationalities which are now under Turkish rule should be assured an undoubted security of life and an absolutely unmolested opportunity of an autonomous development,” sparked optimism in the Arab world that the era of imperialism was coming to an end. The Arabs united to form their political proposals, based on ideas of self-determination and minority rights. More concretely, Arab political groups in Greater Syria held meetings to elect their delegates for the Syrian General Congress that was planned in June 1919 in Damascus. At the congress, the delegates agreed that the future state should become a democratic one, with equal rights, the opposition to Zionism was almost unanimous.

The Commission's effectiveness was hampered by the fact that it was the British army that actually protected them and controlled the translators, giving a skewed view of opinion where it was considerably easier to decry the French than the British. In spite of this, based on interviews with local elites as well as people of lower strata such as spice sellers, green grocers and carpenters, the Commission concluded that, while independence was preferred, the Americans were considered the second-best choice for a colonial power, the British the third-best, and the French easily the worst choice.

Based on these interviews, King concluded that while the Middle East was "not ready" for independence, a colonial government would not serve the people well either. He recommended instead that the Americans move in to occupy the region, because only the United States could be trusted to guide the people to self-sufficiency and independence rather than become an imperialist occupier. From King's personal writings, it seems that his overriding concern was the morally correct course of action, not necessarily tempered by politics or pragmatism. The Republicans had regained control of the United States Senate in the 1918 midterm elections. In light of Republican isolationism, the probability of a huge military involvement and occupation overseas, even given British and French approval, was practically nil.

The British Foreign Office was willing to allow either the United States or Great Britain to administer the proposed Palestine mandate, but not the French or the Italian governments. The point ended up being moot in any case, as Lloyd George and Georges Clemenceau, heads of governments of Great Britain and France, prevailed in drafting the provisions of the San Remo conference and the Treaty of Sèvres. Lloyd George commented that "the friendship of France is worth ten Syrias." France received Syria while Britain would get Mesopotamia (Iraq) and Palestine, contrary to the expressed wishes of both the interviewees and the Commission itself. In the United States, the report floundered with Wilson's sickness and later death.

=== Delay in publication ===
The Report was not intended to be published until the US Senate actually passed the Treaty of Versailles, which it never did. As a result, the report was only released to the public in 1922, after the Senate and House had passed a joint resolution favoring the establishment of a Jewish National Home in Palestine along the lines of the Balfour Declaration. Public opinion was divided when it was learned that the Arab majority had requested an American mandate with a democratically elected constituent assembly.

== Conclusions regarding Syria, Palestine, and Lebanon ==
The King-Crane Commission's report covered the Arab territories of the defunct Ottoman Syria, then under the Occupied Enemy Territory Administration. This area covered would today encompass modern Syria, Lebanon, Israel, Palestine, Jordan, as well as Hatay and Cilicia. The Commission conducted fieldwork over 42 days in mid-1919, collecting petitions and holding consultations across the region from June 10 to July 21, 1919; 15 days were spent in OETA South, 10 in OETA West, 15 in OETA East, and 2 in OETA North.

With respect to OETA North ("Cilicia"), the Commission "did not endeavor to give thorough hearings... feeling that it is not seriously to be considered a part of Syria, and desiring not to open up as yet the question of the Turkish-speaking portion of the former Turkish Empire." The population estimates included in the report are as follows:

	OETA South	OETA West	OETA East	Totals
Muslims	515,000	600,000	1,250,000	2,365,000
Christians	62,500	400,000	125,000	587,500
Druses		60,000	80,000	140,000
Jews	65,000	15,000	30,000	110,000
Others	5,000	20,000	20,000	45,000
Totals	647,500	1,095,000	1,505,000	
Grand Total				3,247,500

The Commission Report, which was published in 1922, concluded that the Middle East was not ready for independence and urged mandates be established on the territories whose purpose was to accompany a process of transition to self-determination.

The Commission hoped for a "Syria" built along liberal and nationalistic grounds that would become a modern democracy that protected the rights of its minorities. The Commission succeeded in convincing many of the educated, secular elite of this goal, but this didn't affect the negotiations at Versailles. Historian James Gelvin believes that the Commission actually weakened the stature of the pro-Western elites in Syria, as their vocal support of complete independence made no impact upon the result. The French Mandate of Syria was the result regardless, and the native elites were left either powerless or granted power only at the whim of the French. This helped set back the cause of an actual Syrian liberal democracy in Gelvin's view.

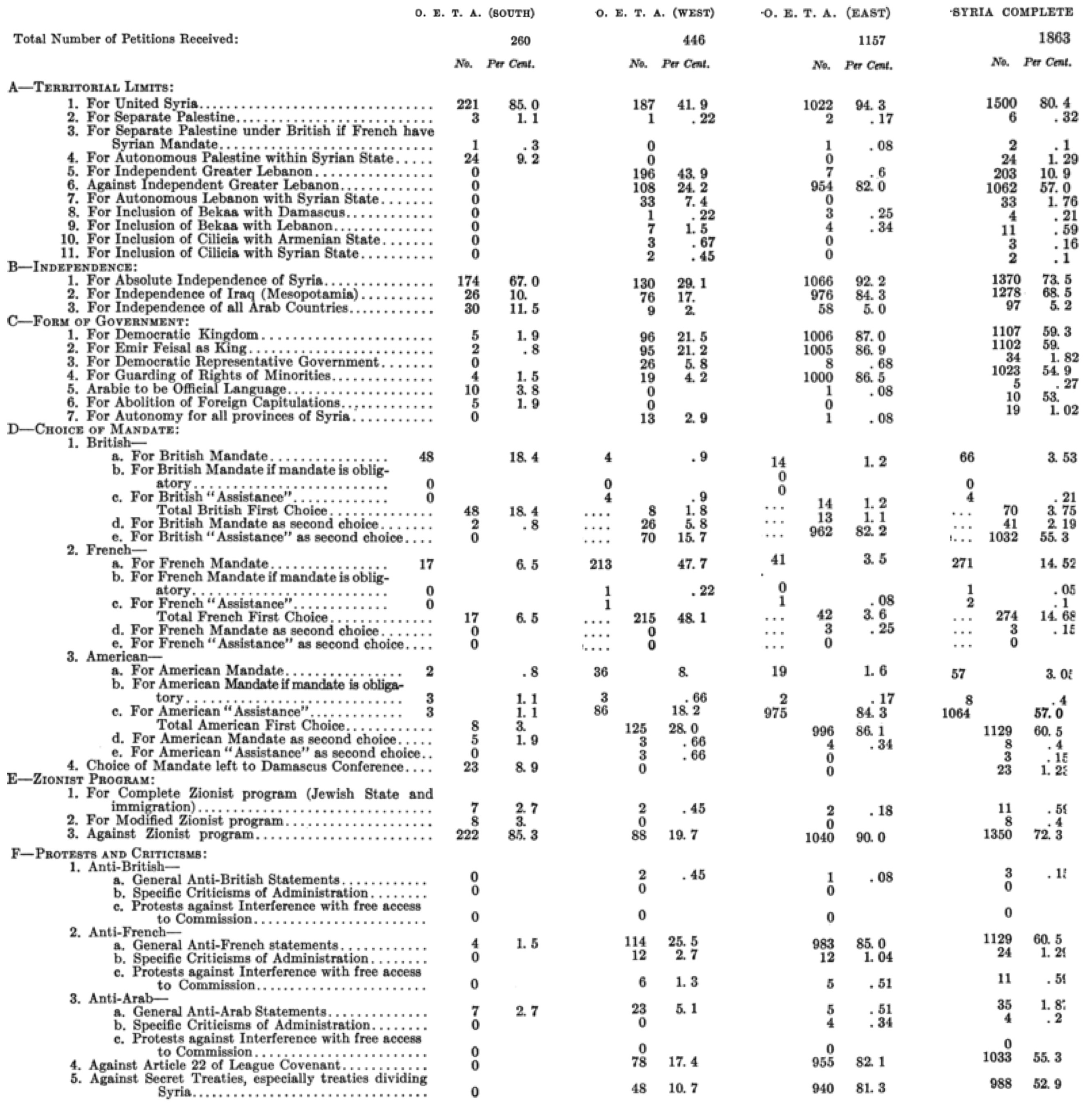
Results of the petitions received from OETA South (became Palestine), OETA West (became Lebanon and Western Syria) and OETA East (became Syria and Transjordan)

Although the commission was sympathetic toward Zionism, it concluded that the Balfour Declaration's requirement that "nothing shall be done which may prejudice the civil and religious rights existing in non-Jewish communities in Palestine", would require substantial limitation of the Zionist programme and recommended "that only a greatly reduced Zionist program be attempted by the Peace Conference, and even that, only very gradually initiated." The commission found that "Zionists looked forward to a practically complete dispossession of the present non-Jewish inhabitants of Palestine, by various forms of purchase". Nearly 90% of the Palestinian population was emphatically against the entire Zionist program.

The report, referring to the Allies' commitment to the principle of self-determination, stated that "if that principle is to rule, and so the wishes of Palestine's population are to be decisive as to what is to be done with Palestine", rather than "the material interest or advantage of any other nation or people which may desire a different settlement for the sake of its own exterior influence or mastery". It stated there is widespread anti-Zionist feeling in Palestine and Syria, and the holy nature of the land to Christians and Muslims as well as Jews must preclude solely Jewish dominion. It also noted that Jews at that time constituted only 10% of the population of Palestine.

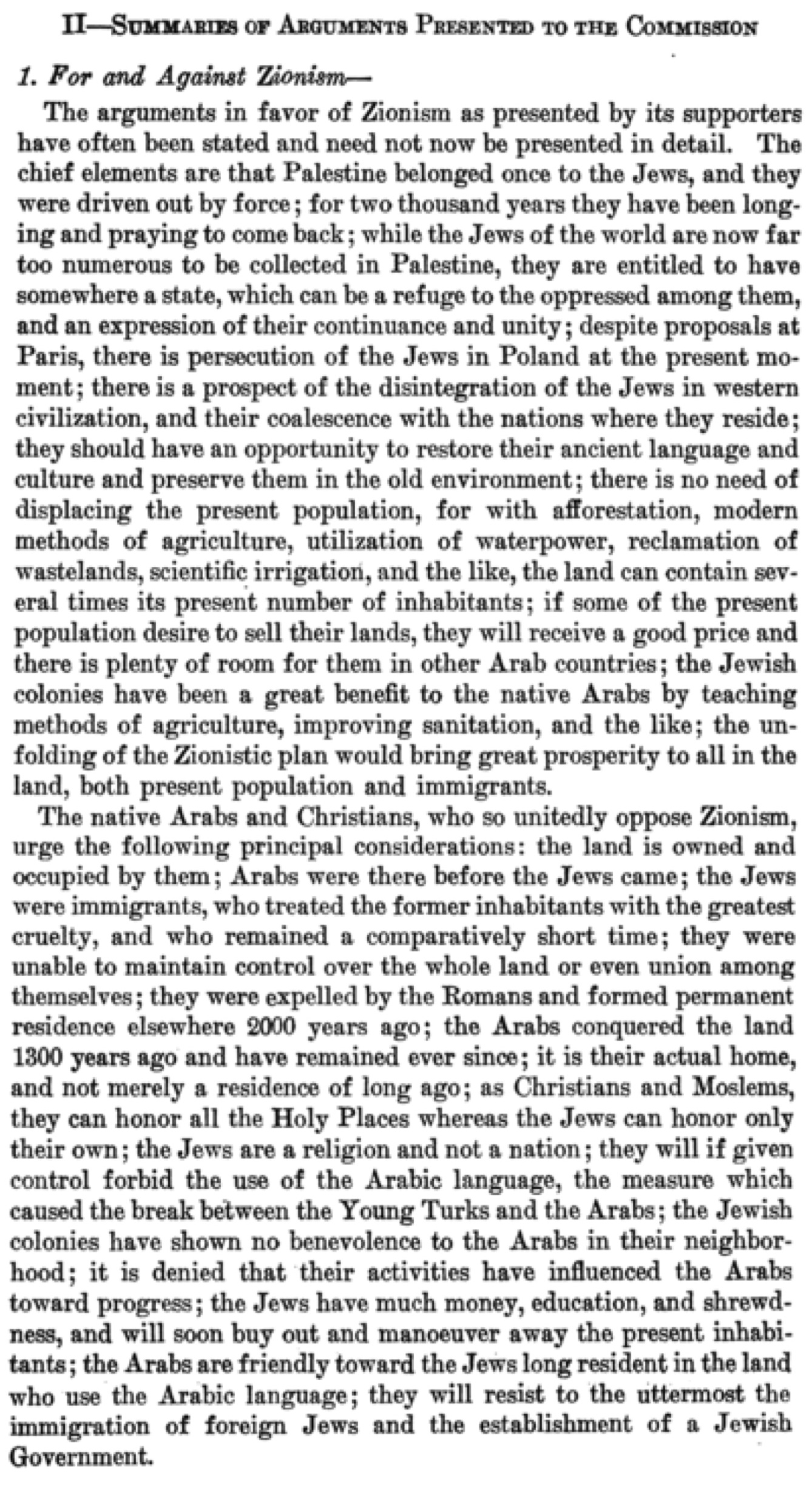
Summary of Arguments Presented to the Commission For and Against Zionism

The Commission Report was skeptical of the viability of a Jewish state in Palestine without the support of a large military. The logic of the Commission went along the lines that the first principle to be respected must be self-determination. It pointed out that "feeling against the Zionist program is not confined to Palestine", but "people throughout Syria" were also against the formation of a Jewish state. It concluded that the only way to establish a viable Jewish state would be with armed force to enforce it. This was precisely what the Commission wanted to avoid, so they dismissed the idea, saying that Zionists anticipated "a practically complete dispossession of the present non-Jewish inhabitants to Palestine, by various forms of purchase". That said, there would be nothing wrong with Jews coming to "Israel" and simply living as Jewish Syrian citizens, but noted "nor can the erection of such a Jewish State be accomplished without the gravest trespass upon the civil and religious rights of existing non-Jewish communities in Palestine". The latter statement was based on the assumption that an army of at least 50,000 would be required to establish Jewish ownership by force. In respect to the creation of a Jewish state in the Middle East, the report cautioned "Not only you as president but the American people as a whole should realise that if the American government decided to support the establishment of a Jewish state in Palestine, they are committing the American people to the use of force in that area, since only by force can a Jewish state in Palestine be established or maintained."

About the international importance of Palestine, the report noted:

"The fact that the Arabic-speaking portion of the Turkish Empire has been the birthplace of the three great religions: Judaism, Christianity, and Islam, and that Palestine contains places sacred to all three, makes inevitably a center of interest and concern for the whole civilised world. No solution which is merely local or has only a single people in mind can avail."

Narrating the fear felt by Christians and Muslims over their holy places, it mentions: "With the best possible intentions, it may be doubted whether the Jews could possibly seem to either Christians or Moslems proper guardians of the holy places, or custodians of the Holy Land as a whole. [...] The places which are most sacred to Christians-those having to do with Jesus-and which are also sacred to Moslems, are not only not sacred to Jews, but abhorrent to them. It is simply impossible, under those circumstances, for Moslems and Christians to feel satisfied to have these places in Jewish hands, or under the custody of Jews." The Commission recommended to include Palestine in a united Syrian State, the holy places being cared for by an International and Inter-religious Commission, in which also the Jews would have representation. All Syria should become under a single Mandate, led by a Power desired by the people, with America as first choice.

However, William Yale, advisor of the Commission, sent in a separate report of his own to the American delegation in Paris that contradicted the conclusion of the majority. He believed that Greater Syrian nationalism was too weak to sustain a liberal state, without giving evidence for this claim. Therefore, he recommended separating Palestine from Syria as a Jewish national home under British mandate and Lebanon under French mandate.

=== Results of the petitions received ===
The King–Crane Commission created "the first-ever survey of Arab public opinion," but its results went largely unheeded. The table below shows results of the petitions received from OETA South (became Palestine), OETA West (became Lebanon and Western Syria) and OETA East (became Syria and Transjordan).

	OETA South		OETA West		OETA East		Syria Complete	
	No.	Per Cent.	No.	Per Cent.	No.	Per Cent	No.	Per Cent
Total Number of Petitions Received:	260		446		1157		1863	
A—Territorial Limits:								
1. For United Syria	221	85.0	187	41.9	1022	94.3	1500	80.4
2. For Separate Palestine	3	1.1	1	0.22	2	0.17	6	0.32
3. For Separate Palestine under British if French have Syrian Mandate	1	0.3	0		1	0.08	2	0.1
4. For Autonomous Palestine within Syrian State	24	9.2	0		0		24	1.29
5. For Independent Greater Lebanon	0		196	43.9	7	0.6	203	10.9
6. Against Independent Greater Lebanon	0		108	24.2	954	82.0	1062	57.0
7. For Autonomous Lebanon with Syrian State	0		33	7.4	0		33	1.76
8. For Inclusion of Bekaa with Damascus	0		1	0.22	3	0.25	4	0.21
9. For Inclusion of Bekaa with Lebanon	0		7	1.5	4	0.34	11	0.59
10. For Inclusion of Cilicia with Armenian State	0		3	0.67	0		3	0.16
11. For Inclusion of Cilicia with Syrian State	0		2	0.45	0		2	0.1
B—Independence:								
1. For Absolute Independence of Syria	174	67.0	130	29.1	1066	92.2	1370	73.5
2. For Independence of Iraq (Mesopotamia)	26	10	76	17	976	84.3	1278	68.5
3. For Independence of all Arab Countries	30	11.5	9	2	58	5.0	97	5.2
C—Form of Government:								
1. For Democratic Kingdom	5	1.9	96	21.5	1006	87.0	1107	59.3
2. For Emir Feisal as King	2	0.8	95	21.2	1005	86.9	1102	59
3. For Democratic Representative Government	0		26	5.8	8	0.68	34	1.82
4. For Guarding of Rights of Minorities	4	1.5	19	4.2	1000	86.5	1023	54.9
5. Arabic to be Official Language	10	3.8	0		1	0.08	5	0.27
6. For Abolition of Foreign Capitulations	5	1.9	0		0		10	53
7. For Autonomy for all provinces of Syria	0		13	2.9	1	0.08	19	1.02
D—Choice of Mandate:								
1. British—								
a. For British Mandate	48	18.4	4	0.9	14	1.2	66	3.53
b. For British Mandate if mandate is obligatory	0		0		0		0	
c. For British “Assistance”	0		4	0.9	0		4	0.21
Total British First Choice	48	18.4	8	1.8	14	1.2	70	3.75
d. For British Mandate as second choice	2	0.8	26	5.8	13	1.1	41	2.19
e. For British “Assistance” as second choice	0		70	15.7	962	82.2	1032	55.3
2. French—								
a. For French Mandate	17	6.5	213	47.7	41	3.5	271	14.52
b. For French Mandate if mandate is obligatory	0		1	0.22	0		1	0.05
c. For French “Assistance”	0		1		1	0.08	2	0.1
Total French First Choice	17	6.5	215	48.1	42	3.6	274	14.68
d. For French Mandate as second choice	0		0		3	0.25	3	0.15
e. For French “Assistance” as second choice	0		0		0		0	
3. American—								
a. For American Mandate	2	0.8	36	8	19	1.6	57	3.05
b. For American Mandate if mandate is obligatory	3	1.1	3	0.66	2	0.17	8	0.4
c. For American “Assistance”	3	1.1	86	18.2	975	84.3	1064	57.0
Total American First Choice	8	3	125	28.0	996	86.1	1129	60.5
d. For American Mandate as second choice	5	1.9	3	0.66	4	0.34	8	0.4
e. For American “Assistance” as second choice	0		3	0.66	0		3	. 15
4. Choice of Mandate left to Damascus Conference	23	8.9	0		0		23	1.23
E—Zionist Program:								
1. For Complete Zionist program (Jewish State and immigration)	7	2.7	2	0.45	2	0.18	11	0.59
2. For Modified Zionist program	8	3	0		0		8	0.4
3. Against Zionist program	222	85.3	88	19.7	1040	90.0	1350	72.3
F—Protests and Criticisms:								
1. Anti-British—								
a. General Anti-British Statements	0		2	0.45	1	0.08	3	15
b. Specific Criticisms of Administration	0		0		0		0	
c. Protests against Interference with free access to Commission	0		0		0		0	
2. Anti-French—								
a. General Anti-French statements	4	1.5	114	25.5	983	85.0	1129	60.5
b. Specific Criticisms of Administration	0		12	2.7	12	1.04	24	1.29
c. Protests against Interference with free access to Commission			6	1.3	5	0.51	11	0.59
3. Anti-Arab—								
a. General Anti-Arab Statements	7	2.7	23	5.1	5	0.51	35	1.87
b. Specific Criticisms of Administration	0		0		4	0.34	4	0.2
c. Protests against Interference with free access to Commission			0		0		0	
4. Against Article 22 of League Covenant	0		78	17.4	955	82.1	1033	55.3
5. Against Secret Treaties, especially treaties dividing Syria	0		48	10.7	940	81.3	988	52.9

== Conclusions regarding Armenia ==
The Commission expressed support for the creation of an Armenian state and rejected that Turkey would respect the rights of the Armenian population, in the light of the genocide suffered by the Armenians during the war.

== Significance for the Palestinian cause ==
Even though the Commission's report did not lead to Palestinian independence, it acts as an important historical reference point for Palestinians to prove the existence of their movement, nationhood, and political goals as early as 1919.

== The report ==
Its publication was initially suppressed for various reasons, and later reported by the State Department that publication "would not be compatible with the public interest". The Commission's report was ultimately published in the December 2, 1922 edition of the Editor & Publisher magazine.

- Report of the American Section of the International Commission on Mandates in Turkey, Paris, August 28, 1919, Papers Relating to the Foreign Relations of the United States, The Paris Peace Conference, 1919, Volume XII, Field Missions of the American Commission to Negotiate Peace, Document 380, Paris Peace Conf. 181.9102/9 (Office of the Historian)
- King Crane Commission, “King-Crane report on the Near East,” Editor and Publisher 55 no. 27 (winter 1922)

- World War I Document Archive
- IPCRI
- HRI

- King-Crane Commission Digital Collection, Oberlin College Archives
