= Saladin Ambar =

Political scientist

Saladin Ambar is an American political scientist. He is a professor of Political Science at Rutgers University, and is a Senior Scholar at the Eagleton Center on the American Governor. Ambar taught for 18 years in New York and New Jersey public schools. In 2008, he received a PhD from Rutgers University. In 2024, Ambar became an Associate Producer of the forthcoming film, Sagittaria, written and directed by Zach Busch. He appears in the 2026 documentary film, Mario, about the life of former New York Governor Mario Cuomo, directed by Peter, George, and Teddy Kunhardt. The film premiered at the 2026 Tribeca Film Festival.

== Books ==
In 2023, Ambar won the PROSE Book Award in Government and Politics from the Association of American Publishers for his Stars and Shadows: The Politics of Interracial Friendship From Jefferson to Obama (Oxford University Press 2022)

- Murder on the Mississippi: The Shocking Crimes That Shaped Abraham Lincoln (Diversion Books, 2025)
- Malcolm X at Oxford Union: Racial Politics in a Global Era (Oxford University Press, 2014)
- Stars and Shadows: The Politics of Interracial Friendship from Jefferson to Obama (Oxford University Press, 2022)
- American Cicero: Mario Cuomo and the Defense of American Liberalism (Oxford University Press, 2017)
- How Governors Built the Modern American Presidency (University of Pennsylvania Press, 2012)
- Reconsidering American Political Thought (Routledge, 2019)
