= Hang Serei Odom =

- Born: Hang Serei Odom; 1970?
- Disappeared: 9 September 2012 (aged 41–42); O'Chum district of northeastern Ratanakiri province, Cambodia
- Status: Found dead
- Died: Cambodia
- Cause of death: Wounds to the head with a blunt instrument
- Body discovered: 11 September 2012
- Occupation: Journalist
- Employer: Virakchun Khmer Daily
- Known for: his environmental journalism

Hang Serei Odom (also known as Hang Serei Oudom) (1970 – 11 September 2012), was a Cambodian journalist for the Virakchun Khmer Daily newspaper in the Ou Chum district of northeastern Ratanakiri province of Cambodia, was involved in environmental reporting about illegal logging when he was murdered.

Odom was the first reporter in Cambodia since 2008 to be killed while reporting or for his reporting.

== Career ==
The northwest province of Ratanakiri in Cambodia

During his time working for the Virakchun Khmer Daily newspaper, Hang Serei Odom was known for reporting on stories that involved illegal logging activities. In the months before his death, he uncovered several cases that were linked to Cambodia's elite, including a story published 6 September about the son of a military police commander, causing investigations into their involvement in illegal logging. Hang Serei Odom was fearless in the way that he wrote about the luxury wood industry in his hometown. His stories reportedly had a negative impact on the businesses of many of the connected powerful officials in Cambodia, which is ultimately what led to his death.

== Death ==
Hang Serei Odom was found in the trunk of his own car which was parked at a cashew plantation in the Ranatakir province of Cambodia on 11 September 2012. His wife reported him missing after he did not return from a meeting. He was found with two ax-wounds to his head, one in the back of the head and one in the forehead.

Odom's murder was used to threaten other Cambodian journalists. Afterwards, journalist Ek Sokunthy was threatened by someone who had asked him if he knew about Odom's murder.

== Context ==
Mr. Odom was frequently reported on illegal logging activity in the Ratanakiri Province in Cambodia. In his last article, published on 6 September 2012, he alleged that Keng Sanglao, the son of Provincial Military Police Chief Kem Raksmey, was involved in the illicit timber trade and that military vehicles were used to transport illegally cut logs. Like many other journalists in this area, Hang Serei Odom was concerned about the dwindling land reserves in their home town. The United Nations reports that in 20 years Cambodia's forest has shrunk from 73 percent to 57 percent.

== Impact ==
The illegal logging industry is a serious problem in the remote Ratanakiri province of Cambodia where Odam was killed. Since April 2012, two civilians have been murdered in connection with the illegal logging activities. Chut Wutty, a Cambodian environmentalist who was working with several journalists at the time, was killed 26 April 2012. Journalists also face other forms of intimidation. Mam Sonando, a radio journalist, was imprisoned as a result of his reporting on the issue. Less than a month after Odam was killed, Ek Sokunthy, a newspaper reporter, was beaten after receiving threats for reporting about illegal reporting. Press freedom groups say that journalists are being intimidated by the killings, violence and threats of imprisonment.

== Reactions ==
Irina Bokova, director-general of UNESCO, said, "This is the first murder of a journalist in Cambodia in a long time and I trust that the Cambodian authorities will do all in their power to bring those responsible for this crime to justice. Crimes against media personnel must be brought to justice to prevent a climate of fear from constricting journalists' ability to claim their human and professional right to freedom of expression." Cambodian journalist Khim Sambo was the last journalist to be killed in 2008, according to the Cambodian Center for Human Rights and the Southeast Asian Press Alliance.

Ramana Sorn, who represents the Cambodian Center for Human Rights, said Odam's and Chutty's murders are threats to other journalists who attempt to expose illegal logging in Cambodia.

Both the Committee to Protect Journalists and Reporters Without Borders called on Cambodia's government end impunity to discourage others who use force against journalists. The Society of Environmental Journalists and the Earth Journalism Network also petitioned the government for a response.

Forbidden Stories named Hang Serei Odom as 1 of 13 reporters investigating environmental issues that were killed between 2009 and 2019.

== Investigation ==
In September 2012, military officer An Bunheng (a subordinate of Kem Raksmey) and his wife "Vy" were arrested in connection with the murder investigation after the victim's shoes were allegedly found in the couple's home. In 2013, a judge dismissed the charges against the pair, citing a lack of evidence. Environmental and human rights activists criticized the decision.

== See also ==
- Human rights in Cambodia
