= Earth Journalism Network =

- Formation: August 1, 2004; 22 years ago
- Founder: James Fahn
- Type: Nonprofit organization
- Parent organization: Internews
- Website: earthjournalism.net

Earth Journalism Network (EJN) is an Internews and Internews Europe project. Internews is an international non-profit organization. Internews initially developed the Earth Journalism Network (EJN) in 2004 to enable journalists from low and middle-income countries to cover the environment more effectively. EJN is now a global network working with reporters and media outlets in virtually every region of the world.

EJN trains journalists to cover a wide variety of issues, including climate change, biodiversity, the ocean, and One Health. EJN also works to establish networks of environmental journalists in countries where they don't exist and build their capacity where they do. This work is done through workshops and the development of training materials and by offering Fellowship programs, grants to media organizations, story stipends, and support for story production and distribution.

== Work ==
=== Fellowships ===
Both independently and in partnership with other organizations, the Earth Journalism Network awards fellowships to journalists which allow them to attend conferences within the field of environmentalism. In particular, EJN’s Climate Change Media Partnership, currently run together with the Stanley Center for Peace and Security based in Muscatine, Iowa, has brought more than 500 journalists to the UNFCCC Conferences of the Parties (COPs) since 2007. CCMP is EJN’s most popular program, drawing more than 500 applications each year for only 20 spots. Applications typically open in May or June of each year, with final results announced in September.

EJN has also offered fellowships to other COPs, including the UN Convention on Biological Diversity and the UN Convention to Combat Desertification; other fellowships have included visits to the UN Ocean Conference, World Conservation Congress, World Water Forum, Global Environment Facility Assembly, among others.

Prior to and throughout these events, EJN holds workshops to train reporters on environmental journalism best practices.

=== Advocacy ===
==== Murder of Hang Serei Oudom ====
In September 2012, the Earth Journalism Network and the Society of Environmental Journalists circulated a joint petition calling on the Cambodian government to launch a full investigation into the murder of environmental journalist Hang Serei Oudom. Oudom had been covering illegal logging activities for the local newspaper Vorakchun Khmer Daily when his body was discovered with several axe blows to the head. The New York Times' Andrew Revkin called attention to this petition on his blog Dot Earth.

== Leadership ==
James Fahn is the executive director of Earth Journalism Network. Fahn was originally based in Thailand for nine years where he was a reporter and editor for The Nation, an English-language daily newspaper based in Bangkok.
