= Internews =

American media organization

- Established: 1982 (44 years ago)
- Founders: David M. Hoffman; Kim Spencer; Evelyn Messinger
- Types: nonprofit organization
- Headquarters: 876 7th St, Arcata, California
- Country: United States
- Coordinates: 40°52′04″N 124°05′17″W
- Website: www.internews.org

Internews Network, now Internews, is a 501(c)(3) organization incorporated in California, formed in 1982. It was founded by David M. Hoffman, Kim Spencer, and Evelyn Messinger. The president and CEO is Jeanne Bourgault.

Internews Europe is an independent media development organization, based in London, United Kingdom and relying mainly on European funding. Internews Europe is chaired by Mark Stephens. One of the organization's first projects was a series of Spacebridges that connected the U.S. and Soviet Union by satellite, a program that culminated with a TV series named "Capital to Capital" that aired on ABC and won an Emmy Award in 1988.

In early 2015, Internews Network and Internews Europe began to integrate more closely and operate cooperatively with independent boards of directors.

According to Anadolu, a Turkish state-run media agency, Internews is "suspected of promoting covert censorship and media control" and has received significant US government funding. The Center for Public Integrity wrote that "the vast majority of Internews’ efforts are bankrolled by the U.S. Agency for International Development and other federal sources." Its board of directors has included several (former) US government officials.

== Overview ==
According to their mission statement, "Internews is a nonprofit that supports independent media in 100 countries — from radio stations in refugee camps, to hyper-local news outlets, to filmmakers and technologists. Internews trains journalists and digital rights activists, tackles disinformation, and offers business expertise to help media outlets thrive financially. For 40 years, it has helped partners reach millions of people with trustworthy information that saves lives, improves livelihoods, and holds institutions accountable."

According to Internews' 2021 990 form, the organization is primarily supported by the US and European governments, with additional support from foundations and individuals. Funders have included the AOL-Time Warner Foundation, the Beagle Foundation, the Carnegie Corporation of New York, the Bill & Melinda Gates Foundation and others.

Share of yearly government contributions to total revenues 2001-2021
Year	share [%]	total revenue [$]	government contributions [$]
2001	81.59	17,392,360	14,190,285
2002	78.31	19,178,928	15,019,035
2003	84.28	22,678,135	19,112,784
2004	93.85	26,713,336	25,069,832
2005	86.25	24,733,840	21,331,917
2006	91.22	25,258,307	23,040,293
2007	94.24	26,778,399	25,236,162
2008	96.91	28,897,690	28,003,819
2009	92.89	33,098,734	30,745,460
2010	71.56	42,067,236	30,101,939
2011	92.42	56,644,153	52,350,784
2012	95.05	55,051,041	52,327,393
2013	90.84	55,475,289	50,394,554
2014	86.02	52,523,028	45,177,894
2015	93.86	56,435,553	52,969,464
2016	93.13	51,196,517	47,679,161
2017	92.61	53,245,387	49,308,717
2018	93.16	53,606,756	49,942,046
2019	72.42	66,793,506	48,372,313
2020	69.18	74,708,960	51,683,379
2021	68.53	84,725,218	58,059,180
2023	75.88	123,850,736	93,974,716

== Criminal investigations ==
In April 2007, Russian police raided the office of the Educated Media Foundation, a section of Internews which trains journalists and fosters an independent media, as part of an investigation into its president, Manana Aslamazyan, who was accused of bringing too much cash into Russia from a visit to France. Russia's Constitutional Court ruled on May 26, 2008, that charges against Manana Aslamazyan were illegal. In line with the ruling, Russia’s Interior Ministry dropped the charges and a warrant for Aslamazyan’s arrest.

== Internews Center for Innovation & Learning ==
Based in Washington, D.C., and operating globally, The Internews Center for Innovation & Learning experiments with various approaches to communication from around the world. The center intends to capturing the technological discoveries of field offices to enrich the knowledge base of the international development community as a whole.

Internews' Media Map project once was the main feature of the center. In partnership with the World Bank Institute and the Brookings Institution and supported by the Bill & Melinda Gates Foundation, the Media Map project analyzed and published data on the interrelations between information access and outcomes in democracy and governance, economic growth, poverty reduction, human rights, gender equality, and health.

== Leadership ==
The president and CEO is Jeanne Bourgault. The Board of Directors includes senior leaders from media, business and government, such as Chris Boskin, Simone Otus Coxe, founder David Hoffman, Lorne Craner, Anja Manuel, and Cristiana Falcone Sorrell. National Security Advisor Susan Rice served on Internews' Board before rejoining the U.S. government.
