= S. Frederick Starr =

American jazz musician and academic

12th President of Oberlin College
- In office July 1983 – June 1994
- Preceded by: Emil Danenberg
- Succeeded by: Nancy Dye

Personal details
- Born: Stephen Frederick Starr; March 24, 1940 (age 86)
- Education: Yale University (BA); King's College, Cambridge (MA); Princeton University (PhD)
- Profession: Russian and Eurasian affairs expert, historian, musician

Stephen Frederick Starr (born March 24, 1940) is an American academic. He is a former president of Oberlin College.

Founder and chairman of the Central Asia-Caucasus Institute, he is fluent in Russian and is the author or editor of 20 books and more than 200 articles on Russian and Eurasian affairs. Starr's expertise is in Afghanistan, Central Asia, the Caucasus, Russia, and the rest of the former Soviet Union. He focuses on developing nations, energy and environment issues, Islamic faith, culture and law, and oil politics.

Starr has advised three U.S. presidents on Russian/Eurasian affairs and chaired an external advisory panel on U.S. government-sponsored research on the region, organized and co-authored the first comprehensive strategic assessment of Central Asia, the Caucasus, and Afghanistan for the Joint Chiefs of Staff in 1999. He joined the American Foreign Policy Council as a Distinguished Fellow for Eurasia in January 2017.

== Early life and education ==
Starr was born on March 24, 1940. He earned a Bachelor of Arts degree from Yale University in 1962. While there, he was a member of the social and literary fraternity St. Anthony Hall. He earned his M.A. at King's College, University of Cambridge. He received a Ph.D. in history at Princeton University.

Among North American archaeologists, he is best known for his survey of archaeological sites throughout Hamilton County, Ohio. In 1958, the results of his exploration of a prehistoric Native American mound were published by The Historical and Philosophical Society of Ohio, and the results of his countywide survey were published by the Cincinnati Museum of Natural History in 1960.

== Career ==
=== Academics ===
He began work as an archaeologist in Turkey and in 1974 started the Kennan Institute for Advanced Russian Studies, which opened U.S. research contact with Central Asia. He served as vice president of Tulane University from 1979 to 1982, as well as its vice provost from 1980 to 1981.

Starr served as the 12th president of Oberlin College from 1983 to 1994. Despite increasing minority hiring, Starr's presidency contained clashes with students over such issues as divestment from South Africa and the dismissal of a campus minister, as well as his desire to turn Oberlin into "Harvard of the Midwest." After a clash with students on the front lawn of his home in April 1990, Starr took a leave of absence as president from July 1991–February 1992. He resigned in March 1993, effective to June of that year. After leaving Oberlin, he was president of the Aspen Institute from 1994 to 1996.

Journalist Ken Silverstein has dubbed Starr "The Professor of Repression" due to his support for corrupt despotic regimes in the Caspian region. Similarly, a book on the 2008 Georgian-Russian war co-edited by Starr was criticized for lack of impartiality.

Frederic Starr is a member of the World Society for the Study, Preservation and Popularization of the Cultural Heritage of Uzbekistan. In 2018, together with the Chairman of the World Society PhD Firdavs Abdukhalikov, the scientific director of the Project Edward Rtveladze, as well as the UNESCO representative in Uzbekistan Maria del Pilar Alvarez Laso, he participated in the presentation of a number of volumes in the series “Cultural Heritage of Uzbekistan in the World’s Collections” In 2020, during the IV International Congress “Cultural Heritage of Uzbekistan - the Foundation of a New Renaissance,” Starr criticized the incompetent restoration of architectural monuments in the country and proposed reconstructing them virtually.

=== Musician ===
Starr is a jazz clarinetist. In 1980, he co-founded the Louisiana Repertory Jazz Ensemble while at Tulane. The ensemble is dedicated "to preserving the raucous pre-1930 jazz of New Orleans." The band has performed across the United States, France, and the former Soviet Union. In March 1982, the group gave the Doubleday Lecture at the Smithsonian Institution. It also made national television appearances in Italy, Japan and Sweden. Jazz historian Al Rose once called it "the most authentic band on the scene today". The Ensemble's albums include Alive and Well (1981), Uptown Jazz (1984) and Hot & Sweet: Sounds of Lost New Orleans (1986).

== Publications ==
=== Books ===
- Decentralization and Self-Government in Russia, 1830-1870. Princeton University Press, 1972. ISBN 0-691-03090-1
- Melnikov. Solo Architect in a Mass Society. Princeton University Press, 1978. ISBN 0-691-03931-3
- Two Evils: Memoirs of a Diplomat-Soldier During the Third Reich. with Hans von Herwarth. Collins, 1981. ISBN 0-89256-154-8
- Red and Hot. The Fate of Jazz in the Soviet Union 1917-1980. Oxford University Press, 1983 ISBN 0-19-503163-6.
- Southern Comfort: The Garden District of New Orleans, 1800-1900. MIT Press, 1989. ISBN 978-1568985466
- Bamboula!: The Life and Times of Louis Moreau Gottschalk. Oxford University Press, 1995. ISBN 978-0195072372
- Strategic Assessment of Central Eurasia. Atlantic Council of the United States, 2001. with Charles Fairbanks, C. Richard Nelson, and Kenneth Weisbrode.
- Lost Enlightenment: Central Asia's Golden Age from the Arab Conquest to Tamerlane. Princeton University Press, 2013. ISBN 978-0-691-15773-3
- Looking Forward: Kazakhstan and the United States. with Bulat Sultanov, S. Enders Wimbush, Fatima Kukeyeva, Svante E. Cornell, and Askar Nursha. Central Asia-Caucasus Institute & Silk Road Studies Program, 2014. ISBN 978-91-86635-80-0

=== Articles ===
- "A Usable Past" in Alexander Dallin and Gail S. Lapidus, eds. The Soviet System: From Crisis to Collapse, 2nd. revised edition. Westview Press, 1995, pp 11–15. ISBN 0-8133-1876-9
- "Rediscovering Central Asia." The Wilson Quarterly. Summer 2009.

=== Edited ===
- Legacy of History in Russia and the New States of Eurasia. M.E. Sharpe, 1994. ISBN 9781563243530
- Xinjiang: China 's Muslim Borderland. Routledge, 2004. ISBN 978-0765613189.
- The Guns of August 2008: Russia's War in Georgia, with Svante E. Cornell, editor. M.E. Sharpe, 2009. ISBN 978-0-7656-2507-6
- Ferghana Valley: The Heart of Central Asia. Routledge, 2014. ISBN 9781317470663
- Putin’s Grand Strategy: The Eurasian Union and Its Discontents, with Svante E. Cornell. Central Asia-Caucasus Institute & Silk Road Studies Program, 2014. ISBN 978-91-86635-82-4
