= Kim Spencer =

American television producer and executive

Kim Spencer (born 1948 in Geneva, Illinois) is an American television producer and executive.

== Education and early career ==
Kim Spencer holds a B.A. in political science from Reed College and did graduate work in urban planning at Harvard Graduate School of Design.

== Professional career ==
In 1979, Kim Spencer founded Public Interest Video Network, a consortium of independent media makers in Washington, DC, that produced several innovative live broadcasts for [PBS], including “Nuclear Power: The Public Reaction” (1979) after the [Three Mile Island] power plant incident, and “America at Thanksgiving” (1980), which featured humorist Art Buchwald having a two-way TV conversation with diverse families at their holiday dinner tables across the US.

In 1982 Spencer co-founded Internews Network, a global non-profit organization supporting independent media and access to quality information worldwide, with Evelyn Messinger and David M. Hoffman. With his partner Messinger, he produced a series of satellite “spacebridges” between the US and Soviet Union, including “The Moscow Link,” a live two-way exchange between Russian scientists and the first global conference on “nuclear winter” sponsored by Carl Sagan and Paul R. Ehrlich in Washington, DC (1982).

More than a dozen spacebridges culminated with the Emmy Award-winning "Capital to Capital" series, six programs linking the United States Congress with the USSR Supreme Soviet that appeared live on ABC News and Gosteleradio (1987–88).

Spencer was a coordinating producer at the launch of the ABC News weekly series "Prime Time Live" in 1989, responsible for coordination of major productions, including "Behind the Kremlin Walls," a one-hour live broadcast from Moscow, which won an Emmy Award in 1991, and "Nature in a Bottle," a report from inside the Biosphere II sealed environment in Arizona.

In the early 1990s in Paris, with journalist Patrice Barrat, Spencer developed the innovative "Vis à Vis" series: transcontinental two-way video dialogues linking people ‘face to face’ from their homes and workplaces using videoconference technology. Recorded over a period of a week, then edited into 15 one-hour programs for European broadcasters. The "Vis à Vis" format was later used as a model for many trans-border, cross-cultural exchanges. Working with producer Steven Lawrence, three programs were created for PBS, including "Beyond the Veil" in 1997, which connected a schoolteacher in Tehran with her counterpart in Washington D.C. – the first independent Iranian-US media co-production after the hostage crisis in 1979.

From 1993 to 1999, Spencer was the executive director of Internews Network, responsible for managing media development and journalism training in more than a dozen countries in the former Soviet Union, the Balkans, and Israel/Palestinian Territories.

In 1999, Spencer founded Link Media and directed the launch of Link TV, the independent satellite network devoted to global affairs. Originally called WorldLink TV, the non-commercial Link TV is available in 34 million US homes on DIRECTV channel 375 and DISH Network channel 9410. Spencer served as president of Link Media for 10 years and was involved in a 2012 merger with KCET, the major public broadcaster serving 6 million Southern California households. At Link TV, Spencer helped create the Peabody Award-winning daily news program "Mosaic: World News from the Middle East," the news analysis programs "Latin Pulse" and "Global Pulse," the documentary series "Bridge to Iran," the digital media platform ViewChange.org, and the weekly series "Earth Focus,” currently the longest-running environmental program on American television.

Kim Spencer is Senior Programming Executive of KCETLink Media Group, based in Burbank, CA and San Francisco. He is also a founding partner of DigitalCitizen.TV an organization promoting transpartisan engagement and better media coverage of elections.

== Awards ==
- Alfred I. duPont–Columbia University Award for "The First Fifty Years," on the history of U.S.-Soviet relations, with producer Bill Jersey and host Harrison Salisbury (1983)
- International Teleconferencing Gold Award for the "Five Continents Spacebridge," for its complex live satellite connections linking the heads of state of five non-aligned nations
- Emmy Award for Outstanding Technical Achievement for "Capital to Capital" (1987)
- Christopher Award for “work affirming the highest values of the human spirit” for the "Capital to Capital” series (1987)
- Emmy Award for Outstanding News and Documentary Achievement for "Capital to Capital" (1988)
- Peabody Award for Excellence in Broadcast Journalism for "Mosaic: World News from the Middle East" (2004)
