= Evelyn Messinger =

American journalist, producer and activist

Evelyn Messinger (born in Annapolis, Maryland) is an American TV and print journalist, digital media pioneer, television producer, and media activist. She lives in the San Francisco Bay Area.

== Education and early career ==
Messinger received her bachelor's degree in Broadcasting from San Francisco State University in 1980, and promptly produced her first documentary, The Windcatchers, and became a producer and editor at the San Francisco TV series VideoWest. She became a news editor and producer at the San Francisco bureaus of CNN and CBS, then worked in Europe producing pilots and programs for the BBC, France2 and others.

== Professional career ==
Messinger has, most recently, contributed to the creation of the media journalism project News Ambassadors. She is the producer of the TV and online video series This Planet, and was the originating producer of The Goldziher Prize for Excellence in Journalism covering Muslim Americans.

She co-founded Internews, a global non-profit organization supporting independent media and access to quality information worldwide, with Kim Spencer and David M. Hoffman in 1982.

She was the American co-creator of the groundbreaking US-Soviet televised Spacebridges, which connected Soviet and American citizens, performers and lawmakers throughout the 1980s, and was the co-producer of many of these programs, some of which won an Emmy Award in 1989. She was also the founding director of the Soros Foundation's Electronic Media Program (1990-1993).

Messinger is the founder of InterAct (Internews Interactive). She is currently the President Of Digital Citizen, a non-profit pioneer of digital media convergence that has specialized in citizen participation in media since 1998. In this role she worked with journalist Shia Levitt in 2023 on the creation of News Ambassadors, which links student reporters with counterparts in politically or demographically dissimilar areas. She has served on the founding Board of Directors of Link TV, and has been instrumental in introducing new media formats to broadcast television and the Internet in projects with PBS, the World Bank, and many others.

== Awards ==
Her awards include a Webby Award in 2009 for Link TV series Global Pulse (2007-2010), a Cine Gold Eagle for the PBS documentary Thinking Twice (1982), and a first place in the San Francisco Video Festival for her documentary, Windcatchers, which ran nationally on the PBS network in 1980 as part of the Bay Area Video Coalition’s “Western Exposure” series.

== Publications ==
Evelyn Messinger is an essayist and a published commentator on issues of media and democracy, the Internet, and digital citizenship. She has most recently written Puckleman's Way (2023, December 14) for Drexel University's literary magazine The Smart Set. Earlier writing includes essays for The Nation, Whole Earth Review, Qualcomm Spark, MediaShift, and The Huffington Post.
