= Internews Europe =

Internews Europe is an international development organisation founded in 1995 that specialises in media development which includes supporting independent media and free information flows in fragile states, emerging democracies and some of the world's poorest countries. In doing so, it tries to promote good governance, human rights, effective response to humanitarian crises and access to information on critical issues such as the environment and climate change.

Mark Stephens chairs the independent board of Internews Europe.

== Fields of work ==
=== Human rights ===
The organisation trains journalists and citizen journalists and gives them the tools and knowledge to analyse and report on human rights issues effectively. It has been providing support to independent media and helped them to preserve access to independent information. A current project in Kyrgyzstan, for instance, supports the reforming of the media and helps journalists to strengthen their conflict-sensitive reporting skills. In December 2008, Internews organised Every Human Has Rights media awards ceremony during the celebration of the 60th anniversary of the Declaration of Human Rights in Paris. It gathered distinguished personalities such as members of the Elders, Irish President Mary Robinson and U.S. President Jimmy Carter that honoured 30 journalists and citizen journalists from around the world in a ceremony.

=== Humanitarian response ===
Another field of activity is the support of two way information flows between humanitarian organisations and affected populations. In the recent past, the organisation has responded to crisis situations as in Haiti. It partners with a number of humanitarian agencies, including the Red Cross, Save the Children, United Nations Office for the Coordination of Humanitarian Affairs and the UK Department for International Development (DFID) to gather evidence about the key role that effective communication can play in the effectiveness, relevance and accountability of humanitarian response. Internews has been the beneficiary of a large grant from the Humanitarian Innovation Fund (with money from the UK's DFID, the Swedish Foreign Ministry and the Canadian International Development Agency) for a project in Central African Republic, where it support a network of local radio stations providing real-time mapping of developing crises.

=== Environmental protection ===
Within the field of environmental protection, the organisation has been running the Earth Journalism Network (EJN) together with the Internews Network. EJN establishes networks of environmental journalists in countries where they don't exist, and builds their capacity where they do, through training workshops and fellowship programs, the development of briefing materials and online tools, support for production and distribution, and the provision of small grants.

=== Conflict and stabilisation ===
Its work also includes the training and monitoring of media professionals in Conflict Sensitive Journalism in conflict-affected countries. This involves supporting media productions to promote conflict reconciliation and transitional justice, the development of new media policy and regulatory frameworks and local training capacity. In Rwanda, for instance, the organisation has supported the training of local journalists to encourage a peaceful dialogue.

From 2010 to 2012, Internews Europe implemented a project in Pakistan where it has worked with communities affected by the 2010 floods. The project has given a voice to local communities through the use of local media and therefore helped to build bridges between local media, authorities and disaster-affected communities.

=== Democracy and governance ===
The organisation's programmes also include the provision of training in political and investigative journalism, support in developing media codes of conduct and locally driven media monitoring during election campaigns and around other politically sensitive issues. This is because it is believed that a free, accountable and independent media can play a crucial role in supporting democratic development. In Libya, for instance, it organised the training of media professionals and journalists on professional election coverage as part of a project aimed at strengthen the newly independent media emerging after Gadhafi's regime. In Zimbabwe, Internews Europe accompanied the development of Freedom Fone, an interactive information exchange service that uses mobile phone technology. With the help of this device Zimbabwean citizens could share their views and ask questions on the creation of the new Constitution which follows on from the establishment of the National Unity Government in February 2009.

== Key staff ==
- Meera Selva, chief executive officer

== See also ==
- Development Communication
- Media Development
