= Old Style 1751 =

This is the calendar for Old Style 1751, which began on Monday, 25 March, in England (and related regions). The Old Style year 1751 ended on 31 December, unlike England's typical Old Style calendar, which ended with the following March, on 24 March. Hence, 1751 was the final year to begin on 25 March, and Old Style 1752 began on 1 January (Wednesday), in England, Wales, Ireland, or the American colonies (etc.), as a transition year to the New Style (N.S.) Gregorian calendar. However, both calendars had been in dual use in some regions, for many years.

	January 1750/1751
Su	Mo	Tu	We	Th	Fr	Sa
		1	2	3	4	5
6	7	8	9	10	11	12
13	14	15	16	17	18	19
20	21	22	23	24	25	26
27	28	29	30	31

	February 1750/1751
Su	Mo	Tu	We	Th	Fr	Sa
					1	2
3	4	5	6	7	8	9
10	11	12	13	14	15	16
17	18	19	20	21	22	23
24	25	26	27	28

	March 1750/1751
Su	Mo	Tu	We	Th	Fr	Sa
					1	2
3	4	5	6	7	8	9
10	11	12	13	14	15	16
17	18	19	20	21	22	23
24	25	26	27	28	29	30
31

	April 1751
Su	Mo	Tu	We	Th	Fr	Sa
	1	2	3	4	5	6
7	8	9	10	11	12	13
14	15	16	17	18	19	20
21	22	23	24	25	26	27
28	29	30

	May 1751
Su	Mo	Tu	We	Th	Fr	Sa
			1	2	3	4
5	6	7	8	9	10	11
12	13	14	15	16	17	18
19	20	21	22	23	24	25
26	27	28	29	30	31

	June 1751
Su	Mo	Tu	We	Th	Fr	Sa
						1
2	3	4	5	6	7	8
9	10	11	12	13	14	15
16	17	18	19	20	21	22
23	24	25	26	27	28	29
30

	July 1751
Su	Mo	Tu	We	Th	Fr	Sa
	1	2	3	4	5	6
7	8	9	10	11	12	13
14	15	16	17	18	19	20
21	22	23	24	25	26	27
28	29	30	31

	August 1751
Su	Mo	Tu	We	Th	Fr	Sa
				1	2	3
4	5	6	7	8	9	10
11	12	13	14	15	16	17
18	19	20	21	22	23	24
25	26	27	28	29	30	31

	September 1751
Su	Mo	Tu	We	Th	Fr	Sa
1	2	3	4	5	6	7
8	9	10	11	12	13	14
15	16	17	18	19	20	21
22	23	24	25	26	27	28
29	30

	October 1751
Su	Mo	Tu	We	Th	Fr	Sa
		1	2	3	4	5
6	7	8	9	10	11	12
13	14	15	16	17	18	19
20	21	22	23	24	25	26
27	28	29	30	31

	November 1751
Su	Mo	Tu	We	Th	Fr	Sa
					1	2
3	4	5	6	7	8	9
10	11	12	13	14	15	16
17	18	19	20	21	22	23
24	25	26	27	28	29	30

	December 1751
Su	Mo	Tu	We	Th	Fr	Sa
1	2	3	4	5	6	7
8	9	10	11	12	13	14
15	16	17	18	19	20	21
22	23	24	25	26	27	28
29	30	31

Note that Scotland already used a calendar beginning 1 January to 31 December, as adopted since 1600, while England (and related regions) had continued to begin the new year on 25 March, until 1752.

Preceded by Old Style common year starting on Sunday	Common year	Succeeded by Old Style common year starting on Tuesday
Preceded by Old Style leap year starting on Saturday	Leap year	Succeeded by Old Style 1752

Century	Old Style Year
Sixteenth century:	1510	1521	1527	1538	1549	1555	1566	1577	1583	1594
Seventeenth century:	1605	1611	1622	1633	1639	1650	1661	1667	1678	1689	1695
Eighteenth century:	1706	1717	1723	1734	1745	1751

== See also ==
- Old Style common year starting on Monday - for similar years
- Old Style 1752 - transition year to Gregorian calendar
- 1753 - first full Gregorian year in England (and related regions)
