= After Saturday comes Sunday =

Middle Eastern proverb

"After Saturday comes Sunday" (Arabic: min sallaf es-sabt lāqā el-ḥadd qiddāmūh, lit. 'When Saturday is gone, one will find Sunday') is a Middle Eastern proverb signifying that Muslim persecution of Christians will follow persecution of Jews. It has been documented in Egypt, Syria, and Lebanon, albeit in the form sállẹf ẹs-sábt bẹtlâqi l-ḥádd qẹddâmẹk (lit. 'Loan Saturday [out], and you will find Sunday before you'). According to some journalist accounts, the proverb is prominent among the Maronites with the meaning that the Muslims will do away with the Christians after they have dealt with the Jews, implying the pending elimination or expulsion of minorities living in the Muslim world. Israeli folklorist Shimon Khayyat has interpreted it as a threatening message, stating: "Since the Jews are now persecuted, it is as inevitable that the Christians' turn will come next as it is Sunday that will follow Saturday". Recent uses of the proverb have been attributed to Arab Christians expressing a fear that they might soon be ostracized on a scale akin to that which was seen during the Jewish exodus from Muslim-majority countries. It is often reported to be used by Muslim fundamentalists as a slogan to intimidate local Christian communities.

== Usage and background ==
The proverb appears to have been used in the sense of one's actions having inevitable future ramifications, the way that Sunday inevitably follows Saturday. A similar metaphor has been recorded as early as 1915 when an Armenian priest, being marched off in the Turkish extermination convoys during the Armenian genocide is recorded as telling his Kurdish neighbour, who had insulted him: “We are the breakfast, you will be the lunch. Don't forget.”

Folklorist Shimon Khayyat, collecting proverbs predominantly from interviews with Syrian and Lebanese Jews who emigrated to Israel after 1950, but also from manuscript and printed sources, wrote that the phrase is of Middle Eastern Christian origin, and that it means "since the Jews are now persecuted, it is as inevitable that the Christians' turn will come next as it is that Sunday will follow Saturday."

Shimon Khayyat records several regional variants of the expression:

- sallif issabt bitlāqī il-ḥadd qiddāmak: 'Let Saturday pass first, then you will find Sunday before you.'
- ugb il-sabit laḥḥad yiǧī: (Iraqi Arabic):'After Saturday comes Sunday.'
- man qadam (i)l-sabt ylāqī (a)l-ḥadd 'uddāmū (Egyptian variant): 'Whoever lets Saturday go first, will see Sunday in front of him.'

The Lebanese-American scholar Sania Hamady cites the proverb in the form: "Lend Saturday, you will find Sunday ahead of you". In her analysis, this illustrates a utilitarian view of Arabic reciprocity: one gives in the expectation of receiving. The proverb in this view is entrenched in the value-system of taslîf wa-muwâfât (advancement and repayment of favors). Where there is "Service for service, merit goes to the beginner", Arabs have an incentive to assist others because he who is first to proffer a service acquires thereby merit as the initiator in the system of social exchange.

According to a publication by the American Foreign Policy Council, the proverb in the form "After Saturday, Sunday", was brandished as a popular slogan among supporters of Haj Amin al-Husseini's faction during the 1936–39 Arab revolt in Palestine. The message is reported to have meant that once the Jews had been driven out, the Christians would be expelled.

At that time, it is attested as a Lebanese Christian proverb in pro-Zionist Christian circles among the Maronite community, who read the Palestinian revolt against Great Britain and Jewish immigration as a foretaste of what they imagined might befall their community were Lebanese Muslims to gain ascendancy.

On the eve of the publication of the White Paper of 1939, in which Great Britain decided on a restriction on Jewish immigration to Palestine, Palestine Post, founded by the Zionist newspaper man Gershon Agron, reported that the provisions of the policy were injurious not only to Jews, but to Christian Palestinian Arabs, who held twice the number of government jobs that local Muslim Arabs did. Morris in this context speaks of the British authorities favoring the Christians with contracts, permits, and jobs, further alienating the majority. The Palestinian Christians were, the article continued, worried that their jobs might be axed. The correspondent then concluded:

Apart from this consideration of enlightened self-interest, the Christians are anxious for their future as a minority under what will amount to Moslem rule. In fact, some Moslems have been tactless enough to point out to Christians that "after Saturday comes Sunday."

According to Benny Morris, around 1947–8 in Palestine, "all (Christians) were aware of the saying: 'After Saturday, Sunday".

According to a 1956 field report by American Universities staff, the phrase had been circulating for roughly a decade by that time in the Near East with the sense: "after the expulsion of the Jews, whose Sabbath is on Saturday, the Christian Westerners will follow".

In 1967, Royce Jones wrote in the Sunday Telegraph that it was a Jordanian slogan used on the eve of the Six-Day War, and that it expressed an intention to commit genocide on Christians. Jones's letter was cited by Yosef Tekoah before the UN Security Council as proof of the relief Christians in Bethlehem supposedly felt with the Israeli conquest of the West Bank. The Jordanian representative Muhammad el-Farra dismissed the use of the proverb as 'cheap propaganda' and cited as testimony Bethlemites affirming their allegiance to Jordan.

According to blogger Gerald A. Honigman, the phrase was first given prominent circulation in English by Bernard Lewis in the form: "First the Saturday People, then the Sunday People", in an article written for Commentary in early 1976. Lewis claimed that the phrase was heard in the Arab world on the eve of the Six-Day War (1967), and argued that recent developments in Lebanon suggested that the Arabs had reversed their priorities.

== As a slogan attributed to Palestinian Muslims ==
Many sources register this proverb's appearance as an Islamic slogan daubed on walls or putatively on the Palestinian flag during the years of the First Intifada (1987–1997). Many Christian Zionists have cited this as a Palestinian graffito that highlights the putative threat of Muslim extremists to Christians, arguing that it means Israel is only the first step for an Islamic war on Christianity. The proverb has been asserted to be indicative of a tension within the Palestinian resistance as Hamas emerged to vie with the PLO for the hearts and minds of people.

Mordechai Nisan of the Jerusalem Center for Public Affairs claims the slogan had been used on a PLO flag when the Anglican Bishop Desmond Tutu visited the Holy Land in 1989. Nisan opines that there is a Muslim-Arab war being waged against Israel and the Jews, and that Christians all over the world cannot escape being involved:

When the Muslim jihad pursues its Jewish victim, it manipulates and blackmails the West into submission. When the two tangle, the third party never escapes the consequences of the brawl.

The magazine Democratic Palestine, organ of the Palestinian Marxist group, PFLP warned at the time of the first Intifada that Hamas could present a distorted picture of the Palestinian struggle in the world's eyes, as witness its motto: 'The Quran is the sole legitimate representative of the Palestinian People'. So too, it added, the slogan 'After Saturday comes Sunday' might be understood as suggesting that Hamas might turn to the Christians after finishing with the Jews.

Ilana Kass and Bard E. O'Neill also cite it as a Hamas slogan during the First Intifada with the rise of Islamic groups. In a 'worst-case scenario' Christians might be faced down were the Jews destroyed. Christians in such an Islamic state would be second-class citizens.

Israel Amrani, in a 1993 interview with, and commentary on, the Anglican spokeswoman for the PLO, Hanan Ashrawi, called her 'a strange bird in the flock for which she speaks.' Describing a rift in the Palestinian movement between the fundamentalist Hamas and the secular PLO, and arguing that the former movement was opposed at the time to women appearing in public, he cites the proverb as a 'famous Muslim saying: 'sometimes interpreted to mean that after the fundamentalists finish the Jews, they'll deal with the Christians.'

Paul Charles Merkley of Carleton University cites reports from the end of the First Intifada (1993) that the proverb was used as graffiti on walls in Gaza and the Muslim-Arab sections of Jerusalem and Bethlehem.

The proverb has some currency in the Bethlehem area—Andre Aciman mentions a sighting of it as a graffiti some time in the early 1990s in Beit Sahur—and many sources, Israeli and foreign, cite its use there as evidence that Christian fears of Islamic fundamentalism are what drive Christian Bethlemites to emigrate or request Israeli citizenship. As the first Intifada drew to an end with the Oslo peace talks, it was not only Christians but also Muslims from the West Bank who sought to apply for Israeli citizenship. Donna Rosenthal cites a West Jerusalem resident and Greek Orthodox woman, whose family came from Bethlehem, using the proverb to explain the reasons why she chose to live in Israel. Nadav Shragai supports this view, citing Israeli journalist Danny Rubinstein, while adding that a muezzin of the town was heard remarking in 2012: "After Saturday comes Sunday," in the sense that 'after they're done with the Jews, they'll be coming after the Christians,' phrasing that was 'considered unacceptable even in the rapidly Islamizing Bethlehem.' The Arab scholar Salim Munier, who has undertaken research on Palestinian Christians, disagrees, arguing that the emigration from the area is grounded primarily in financial considerations, secondly in peer pressure, and only thirdly in a sense of religious or cultural suffocation.

=== Consecutive metonymy of Jews and Christians ===
It is sometimes interpreted as a metonymy of the First they came ... narrative, to mean that after Muslim fundamentalists finish dealing with the Jews—who celebrate Sabbath on Saturday—they will next deal with the Christians—who celebrate Sabbath on Sunday.

=== Other uses ===
A story title of Sonia Sanchez 'after Saturday Night comes Sunday' to symbolize The Black Woman's Burden, as in the relationship between love and (failure of) marriage. The story's female protagonist has to raise twin boys by herself.

French Israeli filmmaker and pro-Christian activist Pierre Rehov refers to the saying in a 2007 documentary First Comes Saturday, Then Comes Sunday.
