= Old Style 1752 =

Last pre-Gregorian calendar year in England

This is the calendar for Old Style 1752, a leap year which began on 1 January, and dropped 3–13 September to transition to the Gregorian calendar. Previously, the Old Style calendar in England (and related regions) had begun on 25 March and ended with the following March, on 24 March. Because the Gregorian calendar did not have leap day in 1700, the original 10-day difference in calendars had expanded to an 11-day difference, and to compensate, 2 September was followed by 14 September, as skipping 11 days beyond 3 September. Year 1753, in England (and related regions) followed the full Gregorian calendar. Note, below, the shortened length of September.

Year 1752

Gregorian Calendar

	January 1752
Su	Mo	Tu	We	Th	Fr	Sa
			1	2	3	4
5	6	7	8	9	10	11
12	13	14	15	16	17	18
19	20	21	22	23	24	25
26	27	28	29	30	31

	February 1752
Su	Mo	Tu	We	Th	Fr	Sa
						1
2	3	4	5	6	7	8
9	10	11	12	13	14	15
16	17	18	19	20	21	22
23	24	25	26	27	28	29

	March 1752
Su	Mo	Tu	We	Th	Fr	Sa
1	2	3	4	5	6	7
8	9	10	11	12	13	14
15	16	17	18	19	20	21
22	23	24	25	26	27	28
29	30	31

	April 1752
Su	Mo	Tu	We	Th	Fr	Sa
			1	2	3	4
5	6	7	8	9	10	11
12	13	14	15	16	17	18
19	20	21	22	23	24	25
26	27	28	29	30

	May 1752
Su	Mo	Tu	We	Th	Fr	Sa
					1	2
3	4	5	6	7	8	9
10	11	12	13	14	15	16
17	18	19	20	21	22	23
24	25	26	27	28	29	30
31

	June 1752
Su	Mo	Tu	We	Th	Fr	Sa
	1	2	3	4	5	6
7	8	9	10	11	12	13
14	15	16	17	18	19	20
21	22	23	24	25	26	27
28	29	30

	July 1752
Su	Mo	Tu	We	Th	Fr	Sa
			1	2	3	4
5	6	7	8	9	10	11
12	13	14	15	16	17	18
19	20	21	22	23	24	25
26	27	28	29	30	31

	August 1752
Su	Mo	Tu	We	Th	Fr	Sa
						1
2	3	4	5	6	7	8
9	10	11	12	13	14	15
16	17	18	19	20	21	22
23	24	25	26	27	28	29
30	31

	September 1752
Su	Mo	Tu	We	Th	Fr	Sa
		1	2	14	15	16
17	18	19	20	21	22	23
24	25	26	27	28	29	30

	October 1752
Su	Mo	Tu	We	Th	Fr	Sa
1	2	3	4	5	6	7
8	9	10	11	12	13	14
15	16	17	18	19	20	21
22	23	24	25	26	27	28
29	30	31

	November 1752
Su	Mo	Tu	We	Th	Fr	Sa
			1	2	3	4
5	6	7	8	9	10	11
12	13	14	15	16	17	18
19	20	21	22	23	24	25
26	27	28	29	30

	December 1752
Su	Mo	Tu	We	Th	Fr	Sa
					1	2
3	4	5	6	7	8	9
10	11	12	13	14	15	16
17	18	19	20	21	22	23
24	25	26	27	28	29	30
31

With the omission of 3–13 September, then 14 September 1752 became the first day to match the New Style date of the Gregorian calendar, as adopted c.1582 by some Catholic territories. Scotland followed this same plan, in converting to Gregorian dates in 1752, along with England, Wales, Ireland, the American colonies, and related regions.

Other nations, such as Russia and Sweden, continued to use the Julian calendar, in 1752. Although the Swedish calendar had tried a gradual transition, beginning in 1700, to drop 11 leap days during 40 years, Sweden returned to the Julian calendar and finally adopted the Gregorian calendar in 1753. Other nations did not change to the Gregorian system until more than 150 years later. There were many different transition plans used by various other nations (see: Gregorian calendar#Adoption).

Preceded by Old Style 1751	Common year	Succeeded by Common year starting on Monday
Preceded by Old Style leap year starting on Monday	Leap year	Succeeded by Leap year starting on Thursday

== See also ==
- Old Style 1751 - first Old Style year to end on 31 December in England and related regions
