= Jewish Institute for National Security of America =

U.S. nonprofit organization

- Abbreviation: JINSA
- Formation: 1976; 50 years ago
- Type: National security think tank
- Tax ID no.: 52-1233683
- Headquarters: 1101 14th Street, NW
- Location: Washington, D.C.
- Chairman: David P. Steinmann
- Budget: Revenue: $7.77 million Expenses: $7.68 million (FYE December 2023)
- Website: www.jinsa.org

The Jewish Institute for National Security of America (JINSA), formerly named the Jewish Institute for National Security Affairs, is a Washington, D.C.–based non-profit and think tank.

== History ==
JINSA was founded in 1976, three years after the Yom Kippur War. JINSA's founding, according to Jason Vest, writing in The Nation, was prompted by "neoconservatives concerned that the United States might not be able to provide Israel with adequate military supplies in the event of another Arab-Israeli war."

JINSA since expanded its portfolio to cover not only Israel-U.S. relations, but general American national security policy as well.

In the late 1980s, JINSA underwent a profound repurposing of mission which, although retaining the interest in maintaining and strengthening the U.S.–Israeli defense relationship, widened its focus to general U.S. defense and foreign policy, with missions and meetings with national leaders and officials Ethiopia, Belgium, South Korea, India, Bulgaria, Italy, the Republic of China, Uzbekistan, Costa Rica, Spain, Eritrea, Jordan, the People's Republic of China, Hungary, United Kingdom and Germany.

Shoshana Bryen was JINSA's executive director from 1989 to 1991. She was credited with transforming JINSA from a small think tank into a major player in the conservative scene in Washington, D.C. Tom Neumann became executive director in 1991, serving until 2012. Larry Greenfield was named executive director in 2012. Scholar Michael Makovsky joined as CEO and executive director in 2023 from the Bipartisan Policy Center, where he was director of foreign policy from 2006 to 2013.

In 2012, JINSA launched the Latino-Jewish Alliance to engage the U.S. Latino community on Israeli defense and security topics.

=== Policy positions ===
One of JINSA's main goals is to cement strong military cooperation between Israel and the United States by working with the American defense establishment. It emphasizes strong U.S. military capabilities and close military cooperation between Israel and the United States.

JINSA is considered one of the most prominent and leading conservative think tanks, known for its hawkish foreign policy views. The group is non-partisan and includes Republicans and Democrats on its advisory board.

Since 2018, JINSA has advocated for a U.S.-Israel mutual defense pact. In July 2019, JINSA created a draft treaty, which was discussed during a December 2019 meeting between U.S. Secretary of State Mike Pompeo and Israeli Prime Minister Benjamin Netanyahu discussed a draft of such an agreement that was originally proposed by JINSA. In September 2023, JINA renewed its campaign to a defense pact.

On March 20, 2023, JINSA issued an open letter, first appearing in The Hill, signed by 44 retired U.S. generals and admirals calling on the White House and Congress to "immediately provide Israel with the advanced weapons it needs to deter and prevent a nuclear Iran."

JINSA supported President George W. Bush's policies in two regards, advocating the need for regime change in Iraq, cultivating close ties with Ahmed Chalabi. and supporting American funding for opposition groups in Iran.

JINSA has supported Azerbaijan in its war against Armenia as a means to weaken Iran, regardless of accusations of ethnic cleansing of Armenians by Azerbaijan (see Flight of Nagorno-Karabakh Armenians), nor their genocidal rhetoric towards Armenia. JINSA president Michael Makovsky has stated in a conversation with the Azerbaijani ambassador to the United States: "Whatever it's worth, at JINSA, we believe that America has stronger strategic ties with Azerbaijan."

In August 2026, JINSA took credit for several pieces of pro-Israel legislation introduced in Congress, including Section 219 of the House version of the 2027 National Defense Authorization Act (NDAA), which requires the US Secretary of Defense to establish a “United States-Israel Defense Technology Cooperation Initiative” to coordinate across nine categories of defense technologies, including artificial intelligence, quantum technology, and biotechnology.

== Programs ==
=== Generals and Admirals Program ===
JINSA organizes trips of U.S. military officers, retired U.S. military flag and general officers, and students at U.S. military academies to Israel. In February 2023, a JINSA-organized delegation of 30 U.S. military officers visited Israel Aerospace Industries, one of Israel's largest technology employers. According to The Nation, "JINSA facilitates meetings between Israeli officials and the still-influential US flag officers, who, upon their return to the States, happily write op-eds and sign letters and advertisements championing the Likudnik line."

More than 200 retired admirals and generals, including shock and awe theorist Adm. Leon "Bud" Edney, USN, Lt. Gen. Jay Garner, USA, Maj. Gen. David L. Grange, USA, Maj. Gen. Jarvis Lynch, USMC, Maj. Gen. Sidney Shachnow, USA, Adm. Leighton "Snuffy" Smith, USN, Adm. Carlisle Trost, USN and Brig. Gen. Thomas E. White, USA, have participated in the trips over the last 21 years. Participation in the program makes no requirements of the invitees to make statements, form opinions or maintain any further relationship with JINSA, yet many trip alums have participated more than once, and 50 past participants co-authored a statement on violence in the Palestinian-controlled territories that appeared in The New York Times in October 2000.

The program also includes activities designed to introduce the cadets and midshipmen to the many cultures that make up Israeli society, and organize visits to historic and religious sites.

In October 2026, Responsible Statecraft published a report that approximate 66% of G&A program cohort alumni from 2019 to 2016 "have held or currently hold positions in the defense industry spanning board seats, executive jobs or advisory roles at defense contractors and defense-tech firms, or posts at defense-focused investment funds, consultancies and lobbying shops."

=== Homeland Security Program ===
In 2002 JINSA initiated a program called LEEP (Law Enforcement Exchange Program) aimed at exchanging counter-terrorism experience and tactics between U.S. law enforcement agencies and their counterparts in the Israeli National Police. The primary focus of the program is to bring U.S. law enforcement executives (police chiefs, sheriffs, etc.) to Israel for an intensive program aimed at educating U.S. officials on techniques for countering domestic terrorism in the United States. From 2002 to 2020 over 200 U.S. federal, state, county and municipal law enforcement executives have been enrolled in the program, involving visits to Israel, together with thousands of US security personnel attending conferences where visiting Israeli experts have spoken. According to Max Blumenthal in his book The Management of Savagery, JINSA has claimed that it has overseen the training of over 9,000 US police officials by Israeli-led experts. Blumenthal cited one US enforcement superintendent in 2004 these exchanges changed the way Homeland Security was being organized in New Jersey. The US-Israeli anthropologist, Jeff Halper co-founder of ICAHD and supporter of the BDS movement, in an article for Mondoweiss criticized these programmes, as based on military techniques developed to control the Palestinians in the Israeli occupied territories, as threatening to lead to an 'Israelization' of American police forces and a concomitant 'Palestinization' of the American people.

=== Publications ===
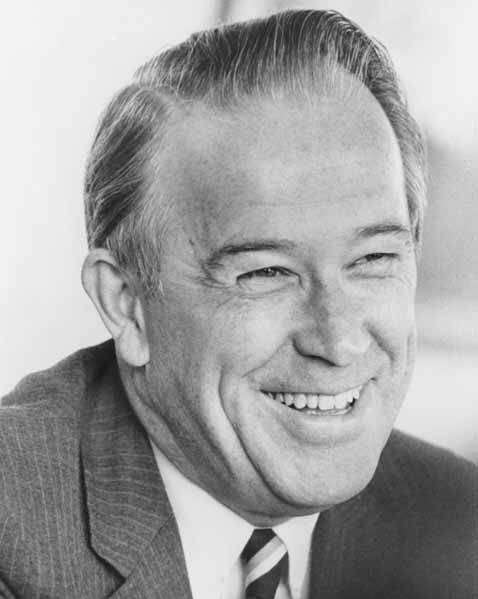
JINSA presents a Distinguished Service Award in honor of U.S. Senator Henry M. Jackson.

JINSA publishes semi-annual Journal of International Security Affairs. From 2016 the magazine became a free publication. For 22 years, JINSA published Security Affairs – a monthly newsletter. Apart from magazines and newsletters, the institute also publishes conference proceedings and monographs. In 2004, JINSA published a reference book: Profiles in Terror: A Guide to Middle East Terrorist Organizations by Aaron Mannes.

=== Awards ===
Each fall, JINSA presents an annual Henry M. "Scoop" Jackson Distinguished Service Award, named in honor of the late-Senator Henry M. "Scoop" Jackson to U.S. government leaders (generally a senior U.S. Government or Armed Forces official, a Senator or two Members of the United States House of Representatives) for their career dedication to U.S. national security. Past honorees have included:

- 1982: Senator Henry M. "Scoop" Jackson
- 1984: Ambassador Jeane J. Kirkpatrick
- 1985: Congressman Jack Kemp
- 1986: Senator Rudy Boschwitz
- 1987: Ambassador Max Kampelman
- 1988: Admiral William J. Crowe Jr., USN, Chairman, Joint Chiefs of Staff
- 1989: Professor Eugene V. Rostow
- 1990: Senator Connie Mack
- 1991: Dick Cheney, Secretary of Defense
- 1992: Congressman Les Aspin
- 1993: Congressman John P. Murtha
- 1994: Senator Daniel K. Inouye
- 1995: Senator Ted Stevens
- 1996: Congressman Duncan Hunter and Congressman Norm Dicks
- 1997: Senator Joe Lieberman
- 1998: Senator John Warner
- 1999: Congressman Ike Skelton and Congressman Curt Weldon
- 2000: Senator Max Cleland
- 2001: Gordon England, Secretary of the Navy, Dr. James Roche, Secretary of the Air Force, Thomas E. White, Secretary of the Army
- 2002: Paul Wolfowitz, Deputy Secretary of Defense
- 2003: Congresswoman Jane Harman and Congressman Jim Saxton
- 2004: Senator Evan Bayh
- 2005: General Peter Pace, USMC, Chairman, Joint Chiefs of Staff
- 2006: Senator John McCain
- 2007: Robert Gates, Secretary of Defense
- 2008: Admiral Michael Mullen, USN, Chairman, Joint Chiefs of Staff
- 2009: Army Gen. George W. Casey Jr., Army chief of staff; Marine Corps Gen. James T. Conway, Marine Corps commandant; Navy Adm. Gary Roughead, chief of naval operations; Coast Guard Adm. Thad W. Allen, Coast Guard commandant; Air Force Gen. Norton A. Schwartz, Air Force chief of staff; and Navy Adm. Eric T. Olson, commander of U.S. Special Operations Command.
- 2010: Senator Jon Kyl
- 2011: NATO Supreme Allied Commander Admiral James G. Stavridis
- 2012: Senator Lindsey Graham
- 2013: Senator Mark Kirk
- 2014: Congressman Mac Thornberry
- 2015: Congressman Ed Royce

In addition, beginning in 2003, JINSA has honored six enlisted representatives of the U.S. Armed Services and U.S. Special Operations Command, each selected by their respective services, with the "Grateful Nation Award" for duty that, while exemplary, might otherwise go unrecognized.

== See also ==
- American Israel Public Affairs Committee
- American Jewish Committee
- Foreign policy interest group
- Jewish Council for Public Affairs
- Military history of Jewish Americans
- Saban Center for Middle East Policy
- The Conference of Presidents of Major American Jewish Organizations
- Washington Institute for Near East Policy
