= The Journal of International Security Affairs =

The Journal of International Security Affairs is an American electronic journal on international relations and U.S. foreign and defense policy published twice annually by the Jewish Institute for National Security Affairs. It was established in 2001 and its editor-in-chief is Ilan Berman (American Foreign Policy Council). Notable members of its editorial board include John Bolton, former UN Ambassador and U.S. National Security Advisor, and the late Major General Sidney Schachnow.

The headquarters of the Journal of International Security Affairs is in Washington, D.C.
