= Central Asia-Caucasus Institute =

International think tank

The Central Asia-Caucasus Institute or CACI was founded in 1996 by S. Frederick Starr, a research professor at Johns Hopkins University's School of Advanced International Studies. He has served as vice president of Tulane University and as president of Oberlin College (1983–1994) and the Aspen Institute. He has advised three U.S. presidents on Russian/Eurasian affairs and chaired an external advisory panel on U.S. government-sponsored research on the region, organized and co-authored the first strategic assessment of Central Asia, the Caucasus and Afghanistan for the Joint Chiefs of Staff in 1999, and was involved in the drafting of U.S. legislation affecting the region.

The Central Asia-Caucasus Institute is housed at the American Foreign Policy Council's (AFPC) offices on Capitol Hill. Together with the Silk Road Studies Program, which is housed within the Institute for Security and Development Policy (ISDP), it forms a joint transatlantic think tank with offices in Washington, D.C., and Stockholm, Sweden. Dr. S. Frederick Starr serves as the chairman, while Dr. Svante E. Cornell serves as director of the institute. The institute's fellows include Enders Wimbush, Mamuka Tsereteli, Svante Cornell, Laura Linderman, S. Frederick Starr, and David Soumbadze. CACI was affiliated with the Paul H. Nitze School of Advanced International Studies at Johns Hopkins University for 19 years, until February 2017. Its in-house publications include the CACI Analyst, the Türkiye Analyst and the Silk Road Paper series. The series includes papers and monographs on topics such as the Armenian-Azerbaijani conflict, democracy and Western policy in Georgia, Central Asian cooperation, U.S. foreign policy in greater Central Asia, extremism in Türkiye, and secularism in Central Asia and Azerbaijan.

CACI also mounts a program of forums in Washington, D.C., jointly with the Atlantic Council.

CACI sponsors a Rumsfeld Fellowship program jointly with the Rumsfeld Foundation. The goal of the program is to foster better understanding and build stronger relations between the United States and countries of the region. Since its inaugural session in the fall of 2008 the program has brought over three hundred young leaders to the United States to conduct independent research and to meet policymakers, business leaders, journalists and academics.

In addition, a yearly CAMCA (Central Asia–Mongolia–Caucasus–Afghanistan) Regional Forum has evolved out of the Rumsfeld Fellowship Program. The 2016 Forum took place in Tbilisi, Georgia and included President Giorgi Margvelashvili, Prime Minister Giorgi Kvirikashvili, Donald H. Rumsfeld, and Ambassador R. James Woolsey among its speakers. The 2026 CAMCA Regional Forum will be held in Baku, Azerbaijan.
