= Profiles in Terror =

2004 book by Aaron Mannes

- Author: Aaron Mannes
- Cover artist: Douglas Grigar (design)
- Published: 2004 Rowman & Littlefield
- Media type: Hardcover
- Pages: 392
- ISBN: 0-7425-3525-8
- OCLC: 55679529
- Dewey Decimal: 303.6/25/0956 22
- LC Class: HV6433.M5 M35 2004

Profiles in Terror: A Guide to Middle East Terrorist Organizations is a 2004 book by Aaron Mannes. It profiles more than twenty terrorist organizations operating in the Middle East and their affiliate groups worldwide, describing their characteristics: ideology and objectives; history; leadership; organization; external relations; financial support networks; target and tactics; external relations; a chronology of significant events and attacks; and references for each group.

The book was published by Rowman & Littlefield in 2004 as a 392-page hardcover (ISBN 0-7425-3525-8). It was published in cooperation with JINSA Press (an imprint of the Jewish Institute for National Security Affairs) as a JINSA book.
