= Ilan Berman =

American legal and foreign policy scholar (1975–present)

Ilan I. Berman
- Born: December 23, 1975 (age 50)
- Education: Brandeis University (BA); American University (MA, JD)
- Occupations: Lawyer, policy analyst
- Known for: Middle East and Iran analysis
- Notable work: Winning the Long War: Retaking the Offensive Against Radical Islam (2009); Tehran Rising: Iran's Challenge to the United States ( 2005)

Ilan I. Berman (born December 23, 1975) is an American lawyer and policy analyst. He is the Vice President of the American Foreign Policy Council. He focuses on regional security in the Middle East, Central Asia, and the Russian Federation.

== Early life ==
Berman's parents were Soviet Jews who were refuseniks.

== Education ==
Berman has a BA in Politics from Brandeis University, an MA in International Politics from American University, and a JD from Washington College of Law.

== Career ==
Berman is adjunct professor for International Law and Global Security at the National Defense University, and a member of the Associated Faculty at Missouri State University's Department of Defense and Strategic Studies. He also serves as a member of the Committee on the Present Danger, writes a monthly column for Forbes.com, and is an Editor of The Journal of International Security Affairs. He has also advised the United States Department of Defense, agencies of the U.S. government including the CIA, and offices of congressmen on matters of foreign policy and national security.

== Views ==
In November 2002, Al Ahram Weekly quoted him as remarking with regard to the U.S.'s targeted killing of al-Qaeda terrorists in Yemen,

It is too early to tell whether this event alone will precipitate a shift toward explicit support of such tactics as employed by Israel on Washington's part. What does seem clear, however, is that the United States and Israel are gravitating toward increasingly similar perceptions, and possibly strategies, in the war on terrorism.

He wrote in his 2005 book Tehran Rising: Iran's Challenge to the United States and has said in speeches that in displacing Saddam Hussein's government in Iraq which had been an enemy of Iran, and the Taliban in Afghanistan which had been a rival, the United States had unintentionally taken away two significant checks on the power of Iran in the Middle East.

In August 2006 he noted that to that point in time, the U.S. had had a lot of difficulty in convincing especially Russia and China, to support sanctions on Iran for its moving forward with its uranium enrichment program, and that "both Moscow and Beijing are major strategic partners of the Islamic republic and have a vested interest in protecting their investments in the Iranian regime." In July 2008 he observed: ""The Iranians are playing a colossal game of chicken with us," and asked: "Does the international community have the will to take the short-term pain and disarm these guys, or accept the long-term pain of a region completely dominated by this regime? I think the world community has essentially come to grips with the fact that Iran is going to go nuclear."

In October 2009, Berman noted: "The Iranian strategy has been pretty consistent all along; to keep the West talking while they work on their nuclear program." In March 2010, commenting on Iran's warning to Europe not to sanction it, he observed:

The Iranians have a pattern of warning anyone threatening to get tough with them, basically saying, 'Don't do this, because there will be consequences. What's notable here is that they are singling out Europe. It's a sure sign Europe is being more activist [about curtailing economic ties to Iran] than it normally is."

Lou Dobbs of CNN in 2008 described him as "one of the [U.S.]'s leading experts on the Middle East and Iran."

In May 2020, Berman, a critic of the Iranian government, confirmed that several people had been contacted by hackers by e-mail using a fake e-mail address for him. Hackers, impersonating Berman, had contacted the World Health Organization (WHO) requesting an interview and sending a link to interview questions which linked to a malicious domain. The Cyberattack was thought to be from a group of state-sponsored Iranian hackers who were known to have targeted Iranian Dissidents, academics, journalists and Human rights defender in the past.

In August 2020, Berman was quoted by The Christian Science Monitor as an "expert in Middle East security" when he commented on the developments of world politics with regards to the Iran nuclear deal framework. The American high-pressure program and especially the secondary sanctions, which punished foreign companies doing business with Iran, had been deeply counter-effective to European aims. In order to keep their economy going the Iranians had been pushed into the arms of China, who had been looking to increase their influence in the Middle East. Berman said, that if a deal, as it was described, was reached then this would lead to "a huge erosion of Iranian sovereignty and acknowledgment by the Iranians that the current economic situation has them in truly dire straits that can't keep going much longer," and that the regime may have decided they would rather remain in "charge of half the country than losing the whole thing."

In August 2020, Berman warned that providing loans to Iran would be a mistake as it would have an adverse effect on negotiations with Iran.

On 4 September 2020 Berman was a speaker of the Middle East Forum. He pointed out the considerable changes of China's foreign policy from his predecessor Deng Xiaoping's low-profile and unassuming foreign policy to Xi Jinping's developing hardline power struggle between China and the United States which included a drive "to supplant the United States as the dominant strategic power in the Middle East." Berman also highlighted the security concerns regarding China's investment in Israel's high-tech sectors and its efforts "to become the single largest nation-state investor in the Jewish state in the next several years, eclipsing the United States." Furthermore, Berman pointed out that "China is slowly ... exporting its system of social control" to authoritarian and repressive regimes to "effectively monitor and surveil" their populations.

== Works ==
=== Books ===
- Winning the Long War: Retaking the Offensive Against Radical Islam, (Rowman & Littlefield, 2009)
- Tehran Rising: Iran's Challenge to the United States (Rowman & Littlefield, 2005)
- Dismantling Tyranny: Transitioning Beyond Totalitarian Regimes, co-editor, with J. Michael Waller (Rowman & Littlefield, 2005)
- Taking on Tehran: Strategies for Confronting the Islamic Republic, editor (Rowman & Littlefield, 2007)

=== Select articles ===
- "Joe Biden's Secret Weapon for Resetting Iran Policy" Politico, 17 February 2021
- "What will Joe Biden do about the Iran-Al-Qaeda connection?" USA Today, 14 January 2021
- "The Israeli-Iranian cold war heats up" The Hill (newspaper), 27 August 2019
- "To Stop Iran, Lean On China", The New York Times, Op-Ed, November 8, 2011
- "The Islamist Flirtation; Mohamed ElBaradei's growing ties to the Egyptian Muslim Brotherhood call into question his commitment to liberal reform", Foreign Policy, April 2, 2010
- "Our Missile-Defense Race Against Iran; The Bush-era plan was the best of the realistic alternatives", The Wall Street Journal, September 21, 2009
- "How to Engage Iran (If You Must); Tehran has mastered the dark arts of deception and delay. Here's how Obama can cut through the diplomatic fog and get results", Foreign Policy, September 8, 2009
- "Review of Iran and the Bomb", Middle East Quarterly, 2009
- "Chill wind blows over claims to Arctic lands", Jane's Defence Weekly, 2008
- "Toward an Economic Strategy against Iran", Comparative Strategy, 2008
- "The Iranian Nuclear Crisis: Latest Developments and Next Steps", AFP Council, 2007
- "The Logic Behind Sino-Iranian Cooperation", The China and Eurasia Forum Quarterly, 2006
- "The Bear Is Back. Russia's Middle Eastern adventures", National Review Online, February 18, 2005
- "The new battleground: Central Asia and the Caucasus", The Washington Quarterly, 2004
- "Israel, India, and Turkey: Triple Entente?", Middle East Quarterly, 2002

=== Statement before Congress ===
- "The Economics of Confronting Iran", Statement Before the Joint Economic Committee of the United States Congress, July 25, 2006
