= Peter Garretson =

Retired U.S. Air Force officer and writer on space policy and strategy

- Allegiance: United States
- Branch: United States Air Force
- Rank: Lieutenant colonel
- Commands: Space Horizons Research Task Force, Air Command and Staff College

Peter Garretson (Lt Col-Ret., USAF), is a Senior Fellow in Defense Policy at the American Foreign Policy Council where he is co-director of AFPC's Space Strategy Initiative. Garretson served as a United States Air Force officer and a writer on space policy and strategy. Garretson was also an instructor at Air University's Air Command and Staff College, where he leads the Space Horizons Research Task Force and helped develop the Schriever Scholars program. He was previously Division Chief of Irregular Strategy, Plans and Policy. Garretson served as a visiting fellow at India's premier strategic think tank, the Institute for Defence Studies and Analyses as a Council on Foreign Relations international affairs fellow. His team won the SECDEF/SECSTATE Diplomacy Development Defense D3 Innovation Challenge. As of October 2018 he is funded by the OSD MINERVA initiative to study contemporary great power attitudes toward space expansionism, territoriality, and resource nationalism. This research resulted in the book Scramble for the Skies: the Great Power Competition to Control the Resources of Outer Space with Dr. Namrata Goswami.
