= Svante Cornell =

Swedish scholar (born 1975)

Svante E. Cornell (born 1975) is a Swedish scholar specializing on politics and security issues in Eurasia, especially the South Caucasus, Turkey, and Central Asia. He is a director and co-founder of the Stockholm-based Institute for Security and Development Policy, and Research Director of the Central Asia-Caucasus Institute & Silk Road Studies Program, and joined the American Foreign Policy Council as a Senior Fellow for Eurasia in January 2017. Cornell has often been criticized for promoting "a stridently pro-Azerbaijani position" and for his personal ties with the Aliyev family in Azerbaijan.

== Education ==
Cornell studied at the Department of the International Relations, Middle East Technical University, Ankara, Turkey. He earned a Ph.D. in Peace and Conflict Studies from Uppsala University in Uppsala, Sweden.

== Career ==
In 2000, Cornell took part in the Baku–Tbilisi–Ceyhan “oil odyssey,” a project dedicated to delivering “the first barrel of symbolic Caspian crude [oil] to the Mediterranean Sea” with Ural sidecar bikes. Cornell's motorcycle was sponsored by Azercell, the Azerbaijani state-owned telecommunications company. During the trip, Cornell and the other participants met with Azerbaijani president Heydar Aliyev, who called them "great politicians".

From 2002 to 2003 Cornell served as the course Chair of the Caucasus Area Studies at the Foreign Service Institute of the U.S. Department of State.

Cornell is a co-founder and director of the Institute for Security and Development Policy. He is the director of the Central Asia-Caucasus Institute & Silk Road Studies Program, a joint center run by ISDP in collaboration with the American Foreign Policy Council (AFPC). Cornell is also a Senior Fellow for Eurasia at AFPC. He is also the editor in Chief of the Joint Center's biweekly publications, Central Asia-Caucasus Analyst and Turkey Analyst.

Cornell frequently worked with lobbyists representing Azerbaijan from Podesta Group and DCI Group concerning Azerbaijani public relations and US-Azerbaijan relations.

== Writings ==
Cornell's doctoral thesis was entitled Autonomy and Conflict: Ethnoterritoriality and Separatism in the South Caucasus – Cases in Georgia.

He is the author of a number of books, including Small Nations and Great Powers: A Study of Ethnopolitical Conflict in the Caucasus.

In 2009, together with S. Frederick Starr, he edited The Guns of August 2008: Russia's War in Georgia, which addresses the causes and consequences of the 2008 South Ossetia War; a reviewer noted that the book's "strong pro-Georgian bias often undermines the quality of its scholarship, at times blurring the line between fact and fiction".

Cornell's op-eds and commentary have appeared in the Jerusalem Post, Le Monde, The New York Times, The Guardian, the International Herald Tribune, Le Figaro, The Baltimore Sun, Dagens Nyheter, the Moscow Times, Turkish Daily News, the Los Angeles Times, and The Washington Times. He also published a paper for NRB Analysis.

== Criticism ==
A 2017 article by the Swedish newspaper Dagens Nyheter uncovered that Cornell's ISDP institute is sponsored by the Azerbaijani lobbying organization European Azerbaijan Society, which engages in caviar diplomacy on behalf of Azerbaijan. Dagens Nyheter also revealed that the Central Asia-Caucasus Institute think tank, on which Cornell is an advisory board member, is funded by the Azerbaijani governmental think tank Center for Strategic Studies under the President of Azerbaijan (SAM), whose official purpose is to "create and maintain a positive image of the Republic of Azerbaijan abroad".

Swedish Member of Parliament Fredrik Malm criticized Cornell for his connections with the Azerbaijani president Ilham Aliyev: "There may be reasons to have contacts with dictatorships, but there is a difference between having contacts and systematically confirming a dictatorship, and even praising the dictator. Svante Cornell's demarcation is diffuse to say the least. In my eyes, he appears to be an accomplice, much like those ones we saw during the Cold War who defended the Soviet Union."

Ami Hedenborg, a spokesperson for Amnesty International Sweden, similarly criticized Cornell's relationship with the Azerbaijani leadership: "Azerbaijan is a country that grossly violates human rights, and if you sit as a Swedish researcher on a council funded by the regime, which is supposed to convey a positive image of the country, it is very worrying. You have to ask yourself: in whose interest am I sitting here and what am I conveying? What needs to be conveyed are the serious violations of human rights that are taking place."

Journalist Lillian Avedian described Cornell as part of a group of scholars from American universities who "built a successful career writing about Azerbaijan’s politics while cultivating a relationship with its government".

== Honors and awards ==
Cornell has received an honorary doctorate from the National Academy of Sciences of Azerbaijan.

== Books ==
- Cornell, Svante E. Small Nations and Great Powers: A Study of Ethnopolitical Conflict, 2001. ISBN 0-7007-1162-7
- Cornell, Svante E. The Wider Black Sea Region: An Emerging Hub in European Security, Central Asia-Caucasus Institute & Silk Road Studies Program, 2006. ISBN 91-85473-27-8
- Cornell, Svante E. Georgia after the Rose Revolution: Geopolitical Predicament and Implications for U.S. Policy, Army War College monograph, 2007.
- Cornell, Svante E.; Starr, S. Frederick., eds. The Guns of August 2008: Russia's War in Georgia, 2009. ISBN 978-0-7656-2507-6
- Cornell, Svante E. Azerbaijan Since Independence, 2010. ISBN 978-0-7656-3002-5
