= Aaron Mannes =

American expert of terrorist risk (born 1970)

Aaron Mannes in 2017

Aaron Mannes (born 1970) is an American expert on evaluation of terrorist risk. He has been director of research at the Middle East Media Research Institute and a researcher at the Information and Network Dynamics Laboratory and the Laboratory for Computational Cultural Dynamics at the University of Maryland. In 2004 he published Profiles in Terror: A Guide to Middle East Terrorist Organizations.

== Education ==
Mannes earned a master's degree from St. John's College in Annapolis, Maryland. In 2014 he completed a doctorate in public policy at the University of Maryland with a dissertation entitled "The Evolving National Security Role of the Vice President".

== Career ==
From 1998 to 2001, Mannes was the director of research at the Middle East Media Research Institute. From 2004 to 2007, he worked on semantic web analysis of terrorism-related issues at the Information and Network Dynamics Laboratory of the University of Maryland. He then became a researcher at the Laboratory for Computational Cultural Dynamics within the university's Institute for Advanced Computer Studies, where he has worked on computerized forecasts of terrorist activity, such as work with V.S. Subrahmanian on predicting attacks by the Indian Mujahideen.

== Publications ==
In 2004 Mannes published Profiles in Terror, in which he profiled more than twenty terrorist organizations. With V. S. Subrahmanian and others, he has co-written Computational Analysis of Terrorist Groups: Lashkar-e-Taiba (2012) and Indian Mujahideen: Computational Analysis and Public Policy (2013), and he wrote the chapter "Qualitative Analysis & Computational Techniques for the Counter-Terror Analyst" in Handbook of Computational Approaches to Counterterrorism (2013), edited by Subrahmanian. A 2008 article in the Journal of International Policy Solutions, "Testing the Snake Head Strategy: Does Killing or Capturing its Leaders Reduce a Terrorist Group's Activity?" has been cited as one of several quantitative studies in the first decade of the 21st century casting doubt on the usefulness of leadership decapitation as a counter-terrorism tactic.
