= Laboratory for Computational Cultural Dynamics =

US research laboratory

The Laboratory for Computational Cultural Dynamics logo.

The Laboratory for Computational Cultural Dynamics (LCCD) is a multidisciplinary research laboratory located under the University of Maryland’s Institute for Advanced Computer Studies (UMIACS). The lab primarily focuses on the development of theory and algorithms that describe decision making in cultural contexts. An important secondary goal is the development of tools to support such decision making, based on the aforementioned theoretical work. The lab is co-directed by Prof. V. S. Subrahmanian and Prof. Dana Nau.

== Motivation ==
The overall goal of the LCCD is to develop the computational infrastructure needed to help others when decision making in a cultural situation is required. The technologies developed at the lab see potential application in:

- understanding terrorist organizations and predicting terrorist behavior;
- understanding other cultures in order to facilitate international collaboration;
- preventing crime and reducing conflict;
- enhancing the performance of governmental and non-governmental organizations;
- improving the quality of life among groups in diverse multi-ethnic societies;
- assessing the effectiveness of aid programs in a cultural context;
- aiding governmental missions that involve contact with diverse cultural groups;
- recovery from conflicts and disasters.

== Technology ==
The basic technological architecture of the research at LCCD consists of a theoretical backing for its deployable applications.

=== Theory ===
The algorithms developed, although catered to specific situations, are based on some combination of the following:

- stochastic-based modeling agents applied to different geopolitical actors;
- prediction and evaluation algorithms, used to answer queries like “given some hypothetical world state, how will a particular group change its behavior?” (and related questions);
- computational behavioral models, fed by culturally contextual databases consisting of demographic, economic and political data. These data are collected from electronic news sources (newspapers, blogs, YouTube), legacy databases, and expert human input.

=== Application ===
Modeling the subtle complexities of the interactions between human entities is a challenging problem. The LCCD produces applications based on its theoretical models as a method of testing the accuracy, speed, and ease of use of its technology. These applications vary wildly and include:

- T-REX, an automated RDF extractor that crawls between 100,000 and 160,000 pages per day to provide searchable access to worldwide events;
- OASYS, a tool that provides both quantitative and qualitative analysis of public opinion on certain topics by analyzing news sources. A more sophisticated version is available commercially as SentiMetrix;
- SOMA, a formal, logical-statistical reasoning language through which users can express knowledge about the behaviors of particular groups and combine these rules into a functioning agent;
- CAGE, a foray into serious games with the intention of providing a virtual world for the exploration of related data, algorithms, and predictions;
- STOP, an online portal through which analysts access data regarding SOMA-modeled terror groups.

== ICCCD ==
The work done at the LCCD is inherently cross-disciplinary, as it involves a melding of the real and virtual worlds. To increase communication between the myriad fields involved in such research, the lab (in cooperation with the AAAI) sponsors the International Conference on Computational Cultural Dynamics (ICCCD), an annual conference.

Papers are solicited on computational models for cultural dynamics, and also on applications where such models may be expected to be useful in enhancing cultural sensitivity.

== Partners ==
The research performed at the LCCD is multidisciplinary in nature. Coupled with the University of Maryland’s physical proximity to Washington, DC, long-standing relationships between the federal government, non-profit organizations, and related industry representatives have formed. Funding from government sources has led to deployed applications in high-profile situations involving counter-terrorism.

== Media coverage ==
- The Washington Post predicts increased Hezbollah activity against Israel based on the lab’s SOMA system;
- Information Week covers the SOMA Terror Organization Portal as a way to "predict what [terrorist groups] might do in different situations in the future;"
- New Scientist describes the lab’s work in predicting and preventing terrorism;
- The New York Sun covers CAGE, the laboratory's work in counter-terrorist serious games;
- The Sunday Times covers TREX as a way to "provide early warning of potential conflicts;"
- Science describes work done in TREX and SOMA;
- The Wall Street Journal leverages the laboratory's input to discuss the need to implement standards to protect the Internet from cyberwarfare.
