= Nadav Shragai =

Israeli author and journalist

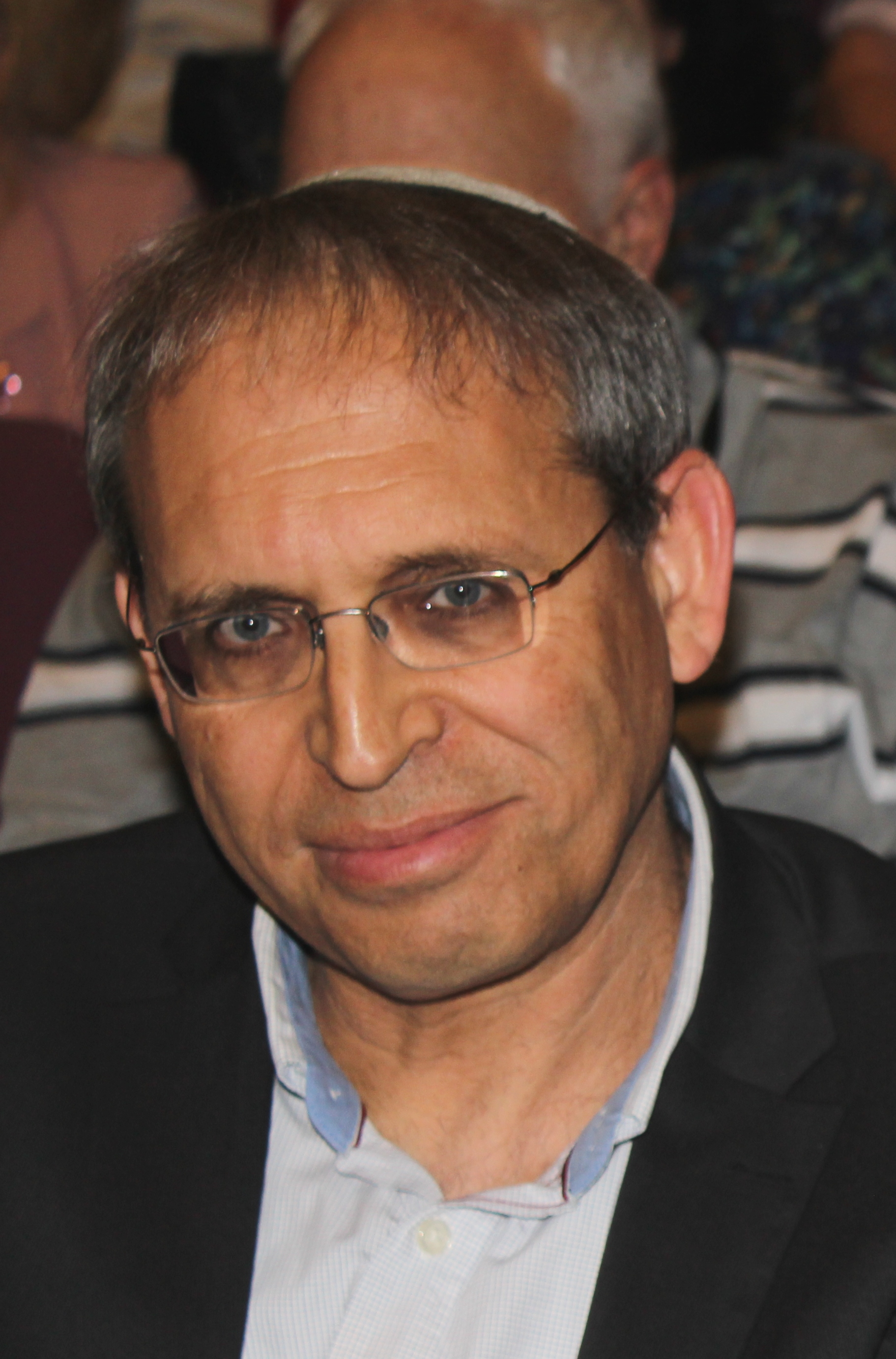
Nadav Shragai

Nadav Shragai (Hebrew: נדב שרגאי) is an Israeli author and journalist.

== Biography ==
Nadav Shragai is the grandson of Shlomo Zalman Shragai, who served as mayor of West Jerusalem in the early 1950s. Shragai was a correspondent for Israeli newspaper Haaretz in 1983-2009, covering national security and religious affairs. He has published a number of books on the Israeli–Palestinian conflict.

Shragai's articles on Israeli security issues, international law and related topics have been published by the Jerusalem Center for Public Affairs. His book The Mount of Dispute: The Struggle for the Temple Mount - Jews and Muslims, Religion and Politics about the Temple Mount was published by Keter Publishing House in 1995.

On his deathbed, former Israeli general Uzi Narkiss told Shragai that Shlomo Goren, former Chief Rabbi of Israel, urged him to blow up the Dome of the Rock, known by many in the past as the Mosque of Omar.

Shragai lives in Jerusalem. He is married with five children and one grandchild.

== Views and opinions ==
Haaretz publisher Amos Schocken said that Shragai was a journalist with clear opinions with which he largely disagreed, but "his opinions never influenced his news reporting, which was always professional."

== Published works ==
- Understanding Israeli Interests in the E1 Area: Contiguity, Security, and Jerusalem
- The Al-Aksa Is in Danger Libel: The History of a Lie

== See also ==
- Media of Israel
