= Vouchsafe, O Lord =

Vouchsafe, O Lord (Greek Καταξίωσον, Κύριε, Latin Dignare, Domine) are the initial words of a prayer from the Matins and Vespers service of the Eastern Orthodox, and the former Prime and Compline of the Roman and Eastern Catholic Churches, and for Matins and Vespers (or Morning and Evening Prayer) of the Anglican, Lutheran, and other liturgical Protestant churches.

== Orthodox Church ==
=== Matins ===
For Sunday Orthros (Matins) this phrasing is employed as part of the Great Doxology:

Vouchsafe, O Lord, this day, that we be kept without sin.
Blessed are You, O Lord, the God of our fathers, and praised and glorified is Your name to the ages. Amen.
Let Your mercy be on us, O Lord, as we have set our hope on You.
Blessed are You, O Lord. Teach me Your statutes. (Thrice)
Lord, You have been our refuge from generation to generation. I said: Lord, have mercy on me. Heal my soul, for I have sinned against You.
Lord, I have fled to You. Teach me to do Your will, for You are my God.
For with You is the fountain of life; in Your light we shall see light.
Continue Your mercy to those who know You.
Holy God, Holy Mighty, Holy Immortal, have mercy on us. (Thrice)
Glory to the Father and the Son and the Holy Spirit.
Both now and ever and to the ages of ages. Amen.
Holy Immortal, have mercy on us.

For weekday Matins, the phrasing is used in the Lesser Doxology.

=== Vespers ===
Vouchsafe, O Lord, to keep us this night without sin.
Blessed are You, O Lord, the God of our fathers,
and praised and glorified is Your Name for ever. Amen.
Let Your mercy be upon us, O Lord,
even as we have set our hope on You.
Blessed are You, O Lord; teach me Your statutes.
Blessed are You, O Master; make me to understand Your commandments.
Blessed are You, O Holy One; enlighten me with Your precepts.
Your mercy endures forever, O Lord! Do not despise the works of Your hands!
To You belongs worship, to You belongs praise, to You
belongs glory: to the Father and to the Son and to the
Holy Spirit, now and ever and unto ages of ages.

=== Compline ===
Vouchsafe, O Lord is sung as part of the Doxology of Small Compline. The rubrics for Great Compline, used during Lent and Holy Week, and the eves of certain great feasts, specifically direct that the Doxology be read, not sung.

== Western Christianity ==
The Greek liturgical text was imported into the closing of the Western Christian Te Deum, which is used in the Ambrosian Rite at Matins, and in other rites as a special hymn of thanksgiving, e.g. the Dettingen Te Deum composed by Handel to celebrate his patron George II of Great Britain's victory at the Battle of Dettingen.

This usage was incorporated into liturgical Protestant rites at the time of the Reformation. In the 1549 prayer book, the first Book of Common Prayer, which was adapted from the Use of Sarum, it was required for both Mattins (sic) and Evensong, but later became optional.

Latin text

Salvum fac pópulum tuum, Dómine, et bénedic hæreditáti tuæ.
Et rege eos, et extólle illos usque in ætérnum.
Per síngulos dies benedícimus te.
Et laudámus nomen tuum in sǽculum, et in sǽculum sǽculi.
Dignáre, Dómine, die isto sine peccáto nos custodíre.
Miserére nostri, Dómine, miserére nostri.
Fiat misericórdia tua, Dómine, super nos, quemádmodum sperávimus in te.
In te, Dómine, sperávi: non confúndar in ætérnum.

Translation from the Book of Common Prayer

O Lord, save thy people : and bless thine heritage.
Govern them : and lift them up for ever.
Day by day : we magnify thee;
And we worship thy Name : ever world without end.
Vouchsafe, O Lord : to keep us this day without sin.
O Lord, have mercy upon us : have mercy upon us.
O Lord, let thy mercy lighten upon us : as our trust is in thee.
O Lord, in thee have I trusted : let me never be confounded.

=== Protestant churches ===
==== Anglicanism ====
The 1549 Book of Common Prayer collapsed the first three morning offices of the Catholic usage into one service called Mattins, and the latter two into Evensong, the traditional English-language name for Vespers. The other offices were abolished. In this book, the Te Deum, including the Vouchsafe, O Lord, was mandatory at Matins (Note: "And (to thende the people may the better heare) in such places where they doe syng, there shall the lessons be songe in a playne tune after the maner of distincte readyng: and lykewyse the Epistle and Gospell. After the fyrste lesson shall folowe Te Deum laudamus in Englishe, dayly throughout the yeare, excepte in Lente, all the which tyme in the place of Te Deum shalbe used Benedicite omnia Opera Domini Domino, in Englyshe as foloweth") The 1552 Book of Common prayer renamed these Morning Prayer and Evening Prayer, but continued the use of the Te Deum Laudamus, with Vouchsafe, O Lord, at Morning Prayer, with the option of substituting the Benedicite, omnia opera. The 1662 Book of Common Prayer called for either the Te Deum Laudamus or the Benedicite to be recited (in English, despite their Latin incipits in the rubrics) after the Second Lesson at both Morning and Evening Prayer, thus the Vouchsafe, O Lord could be incorporated into one, or both at the option of the minister. The present Daily Office continues this use, with modernised language.

==== Lutheranism ====
Lutheran churches generally incorporate the Te Deum, which includes the Vouchsafe, O Lord into Matins. Vouchsafe, O Lord is not used at Vespers in Lutheranism.
