= American Foreign Policy Council =

US foreign policy think tank

- Abbreviation: AFPC
- Formation: 1982
- Type: U.S. foreign policy think tank
- Headquarters: Washington, D.C., U.S.
- Key people: Herman Pirchner Jr.; Ilan Berman; Annie Swingen; Richard Harrison
- Revenue: $3.2 million (2024)
- Expenses: $2.9 million (2024)
- Website: www.afpc.org

The American Foreign Policy Council (AFPC) is a think tank dedicated to advancing the national security and foreign policy interests of the United States. Founded in 1982 and based in Washington, D.C., its foreign and defense policy specialists provide information to members of the US Congress, the executive branch, and the US policymaking community.

AFPC provides analysis and policy recommendations on global strategic issues, with a particular focus on defense (missile defense, arms control, energy security, espionage), international relations, and the promotion of democracy.

== Mission and activities ==
AFPC's mission is to inform U.S. policymakers, media, and the general public on key international challenges through research, publications, and advisory services. The organization works closely with government officials, members of Congress, and foreign policy experts to shape American policy on issues including U.S.-China relations, Russia, the Middle East, cybersecurity, and missile defense.

AFPC conducts research, organizes briefings, and publishes reports on global security developments. It also hosts delegations and discussions with foreign leaders to facilitate dialogue on critical international affairs.

== Funding ==
AFPC operates as a 501(c)(3) non-profit organization. It accepts donations exclusively from American citizens and U.S. entities, ensuring that its funding aligns with its mission to advance U.S. national interests. This funding model supports AFPC's research, publications, and various programs.

== Programs ==
- U.S. Foreign Policy and National Security Program:

This program assists the United States by providing analysis and recommendations on foreign policy and national security issues.

- Central Asia-Caucasus Institute:

The Central Asia-Caucasus Institute covers regions from Turkey to western China.

- China Program:

AFPC's China Program offers critical analysis on political, military, and social developments in and around the People's Republic of China.

- Countering Islamic Extremism Project:

This project focuses on policy toward Islamic extremism in the post-9/11 era.

- Defense Technology Program:

The Defense Technology Program examines how emerging technologies impact U.S. national security and the future of warfare.

- Future of Public Diplomacy Project:

This initiative aims to elevate America's voice in the new Information Age by exploring and enhancing public diplomacy strategies.

- Indo-Pacific Security Program:

AFPC's Indo-Pacific Security Program maps security and strategy in Asia and the Indo-Pacific, analyzing regional dynamics and U.S. interests.

- Middle East Program:

This program analyzes regional security and emerging threats in the greater Middle East, providing insights into complex geopolitical issues.

- Russia and Ukraine Program:

AFPC's Russia and Ukraine Program explores the politics and security of Russia and Ukraine, offering in-depth analysis of regional developments.

- Space Policy Initiative:

The Space Policy Initiative shapes a vision for the next strategic frontier, examining policies and strategies related to space exploration and security.

== Board of advisors ==
As of March 2025, AFPC's board of advisors consists of

- Paula Dobriansky, former Under Secretary of State for Democracy and Global Affairs
- James S. Gilmore III, former U.S. Ambassador to the Organization for Security and Cooperation in Europe and Governor of Virginia
- Newt Gingrich, former Speaker of the United States House of Representatives
- Michelle S. Giuda, former Assistant Secretary and Acting Under Secretary of State
- Bob Kasten, former Senator from Wisconsin
- Richard T. McCormack, former United States Under Secretary of State for Economic Growth, Energy, and the Environment
- Tom Ridge, former United States Secretary of Homeland Security
- William Schneider Jr., former Under Secretary of State for International Security Affairs
- Manisha Singh, Former Assistant Secretary and Acting Under Secretary of State
- Dov S. Zakheim, former Under Secretary of Defense (Comptroller)
- Dr. Christopher Ford, former Assistant Secretary and Acting Under Secretary of State

== Leadership and staff ==
- Herman Pirchner, President
- Ilan Berman, Senior Vice President
- Richard Harrison, Vice President of Operations and Director of Defense Technology Programs
- Annie Swingen, Vice President of External Affairs
- Frederick Starr, Distinguished Fellow for Eurasia and Chairman of the Central Asia-Caucasus Institute
- Svante Cornell, Senior Fellow for Eurasia and Director of Research and Publications, and for Central Asia-Caucasus Institute
- Laura Linderman, Senior Fellow for Eurasia and Director of Programs, Central Asia-Caucasus Institute

== Publications ==
===== Monitors =====
- Africa Political Monitor: AFPC's review of politics in both North and Sub-Saharan Africa.
- China Policy Monitor: The American Foreign Policy Council's review of P.R.C. government actions and U.S. policy.
- Defense Technology Monitor: The American Foreign Policy Council's review of developments in defense technology.
- Global Islamism Monitor: AFPC's review of developments in global Islamism.
- Indo-Pacific Monitor: The American Foreign Policy Council's review of developments in the Indo-Pacific.
- Information Warfare Watch: The American Foreign Policy Council’s review of public diplomacy and disinformation.
- Iran Democracy Monitor: The American Foreign Policy Council's Review of Radicalism and Reform in Islamic Republic of Iran.
- Resource Security Watch: The American Foreign Policy Council's Review of Changes to the Global Strategic Environment
- Russia Policy Monitor: The American Foreign Policy Council's review of Russian government actions and U.S. policy.
- South Asia Monitor: AFPC's review of developments in South Asia.
- Ukraine Reform Monitor: The American Foreign Policy Council’s Review of Ukrainian modernization and reform

===== Articles =====
AFPC experts regularly contribute articles to prominent newspapers and magazines, such as the Washington Post, New York Times, International Herald Tribune, Jane’s Defense Weekly, Washington Times, Wall Street Journal, Financial Times, and National Review. These articles cover a wide range of foreign policy and international security topics.

===== Books =====
AFPC scholars author and edit books that delve into various aspects of global politics and security. For instance, Arabs, Turks and Persians: Geopolitics and Ideology in the Greater Middle East by Svante E. Cornell examines the complex dynamics of the Middle East.

===== Policy Papers =====
AFPC publishes policy papers that provide detailed analysis and recommendations on specific foreign policy issues. An example is Thousand Sails: Why Low Earth Orbit is the Next Frontier for Great Power Competition between the U.S. and China by Peter Garretson, Sydney Nystrom, and David Zou, which discusses the strategic implications of satellite mega-constellations.

===== Defense Dossier =====
This periodic publication focuses on contemporary defense and security issues. For example, the December 2024 issue, titled Warfare in the Age of AI, explores the impact of artificial intelligence on modern warfare.

===== Special Reports =====
AFPC occasionally releases special reports that provide comprehensive analysis on critical topics. These reports are designed to inform policymakers and the public about pressing international issues.
