= Sunday =

Day of the week

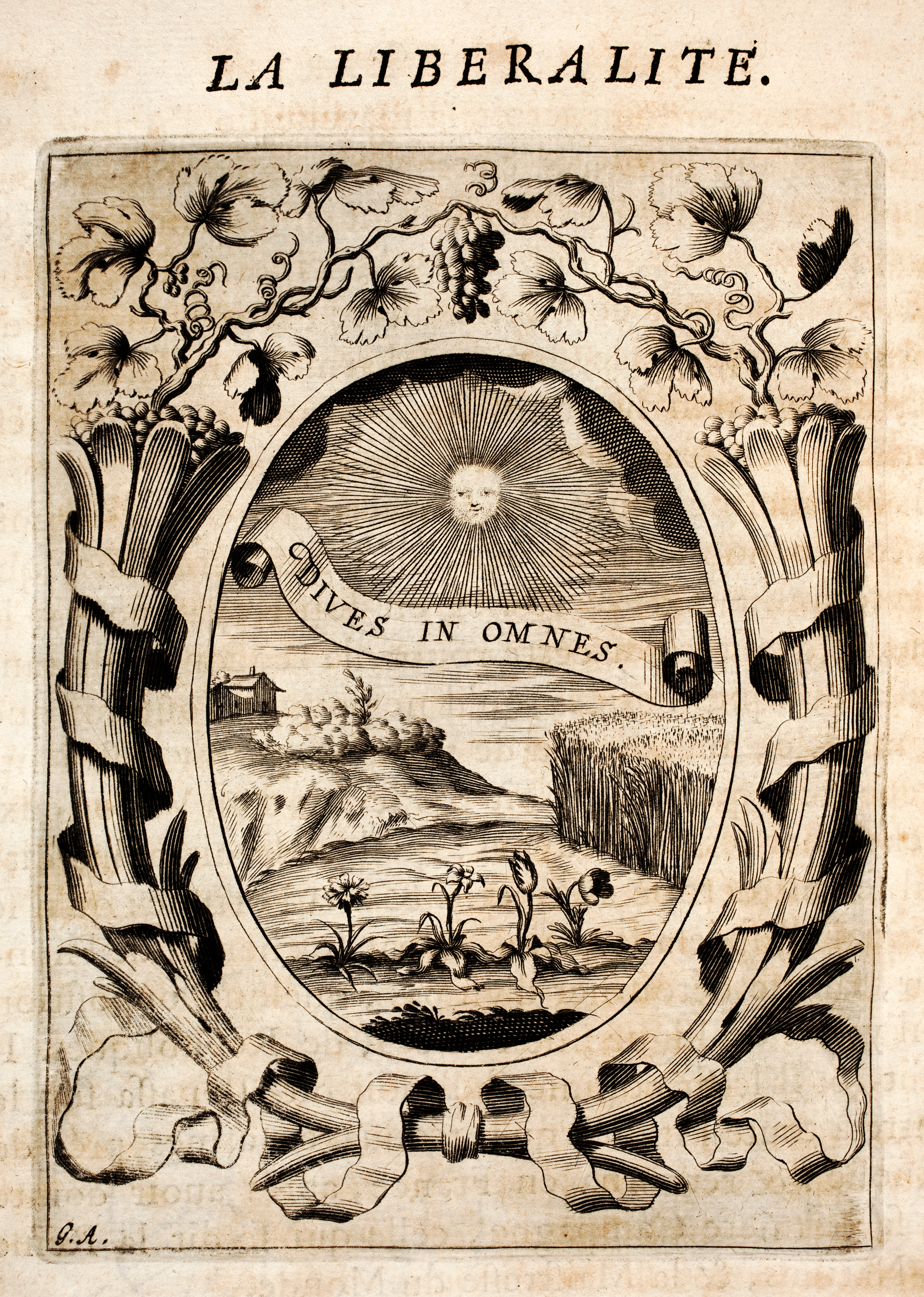
Sol Iustitiae (Sun of Righteousness), derived from the Judeo-Christian Bible, Malachi 4:2. By Albrecht Dürer, c. 1499/1500

Sunday (Latin: dies solis meaning "day of the sun") is the day of the week between Saturday and Monday. Sunday is a day of rest in most Western countries and a part of the weekend. In some Arab countries, Sunday is a weekday.

For most Christians, Sunday is observed as a day of worship and rest, holding it as the Lord's Day, the day of Christ's resurrection; in the United States, Canada, Japan, as well as in parts of South America, Sunday is the first day of the week. According to the Islamic calendar, Hebrew calendar and traditional calendars (including Christian calendars) Sunday is the first day of the week; Quaker Christians call Sunday the "first day" in accordance with their testimony of simplicity. The International Organization for Standardization standard ISO 8601 puts Sunday as the seventh day of the week.

== Etymology ==
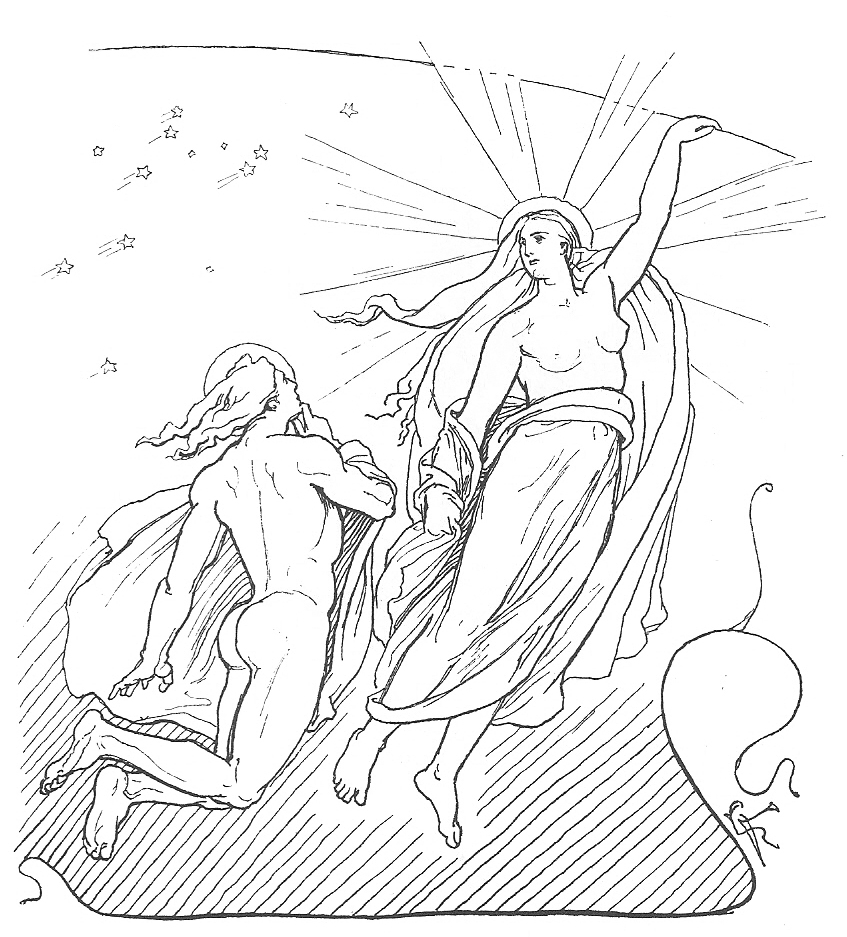
A depiction of Máni, the personified Moon, and his sister Sól, the personified Sun, from Norse mythology (1895) by Lorenz Frølich.

The name "Sunday", the day of the Sun, is derived from the traditional astronomical naming system for days of the week. This system likely originated in the Neo-Babylonian Empire during the Jewish exile in Babylon, though the first direct evidence of it dates to the Roman Empire. The order has been explained in Hellenistic astrology as relating to planetary hours. Each of the hours of the day was assigned to one of the seven classical planets – Saturn, Jupiter, Mars, the Sun, Venus, Mercury and the Moon – and the planet of the first hour of each day gave its name to that day.

The astronomical weekday names spread throughout Europe, including to the Germanic peoples. The names of Sunday and Monday were translated to the corresponding Germanic words, hence dies Solis became "Sunday". The other days took the names of corresponding Germanic deities.

The English noun Sunday derived sometime before 1250 from sunedai, which developed from Old English (before 700) Sunnandæg, literally meaning "sun's day". This is cognate to other Germanic languages, including Old Frisian sunnandei, Old Saxon sunnundag, Middle Dutch sonnendach (modern Dutch zondag), Old High German sunnun tag (modern German Sonntag), and Old Norse sunnudagr (Danish and Norwegian søndag, Icelandic sunnudagur and Swedish söndag). The Germanic term is a Germanic interpretation of Latin dies solis ("day of the sun"), which is a translation of the ancient Greek Ἥλίου ημέρα" (Hēlíou hēméra).

In most Indian languages, the word for Sunday is derived from Sanskrit Ravivāra or Adityavāra — vāra meaning day and Aditya and Ravi both being names for Surya, the Sun and the solar deity. Ravivāra is the first day cited in Jyotisha, which provides logical reason for giving the name of each weekday. In the Thai solar calendar, the name ("Waan Arthit") is derived from Aditya, and the associated colour is red.

In most Slavic languages other than Russian, the words for Sunday reflect the Christian commandment to abstain from work. Belarusian нядзеля (nyadzelya), Bulgarian неделя (nedelya), Croatian, Bosnian and Serbian nedjelja / недеља, Czech neděle, Macedonian недела (nedela), Polish niedziela, Slovak nedeľa, Slovenian nedelja and Ukrainian неділя (nedilya) are all cognates literally meaning "no work" or "day with no work".

In Russian, the word for Sunday is Воскресенье (Voskreseniye) meaning "resurrection" (that is, the day of a week which commemorates the resurrection of Jesus Christ). In Old Russian, Sunday was also called неделя (nedelya), "free day", or "day with no work", but in the contemporary language this word means "week".

The Modern Greek word for Sunday, Κυριακή, is derived from Κύριος (Kyrios, Lord) also, due to its liturgical significance as the day commemorating the resurrection of Jesus Christ, i.e. The Lord's Day.

The name is similar in the Romance languages. In Italian, Sunday is called domenica, which also means "Lord's Day" (from Latin Dies Dominica). One finds similar cognates in French, where the name is dimanche, as well as Romanian duminică, and in Spanish and Portuguese, domingo.

In Chinese, Korean, and Japanese, Sunday is called 星期日 (Xīng qī rì), 일요일 (Il-yo-Il), and 日曜日 (Nichiyōbi) respectively, which all mean "sun day of the week".

The Arabic word for Sunday is الأحد (Al-Ahad), meaning "the first". It is usually combined with the word يوم (Yawm) meaning "day".

The Latvian word for Sunday is svētdiena, literally "holy day", while the Lithuanian word is sekmadienis (< sekma 'seventh' + diena 'day'). The fossil word sekmas (male), sekma (female) has been displaced by septintas (septinta) in contemporary Lithuanian.

== Position in the week ==
=== ISO 8601 ===
The international standard ISO 8601 for representation of dates and times states that Sunday is the seventh and last day of the week. This method of representing dates and times unambiguously was first published in 1988.

=== Culture and languages ===
In the Judaic, Christian, and most Islamic traditions, Sunday has been considered the first day of the week. A number of languages express this position either by the name of the day or by the naming of the other days. In Hebrew it is called יום ראשון yom rishon, in Arabic الأحد al-ahad, in Persian and related languages یکشنبه yek-shanbe, all meaning "first".

In Greek, the names of the days Monday, Tuesday, Wednesday, and Thursday (Greek: Δευτέρα, Greek: Τρίτη, Greek: Τετάρτη, and Greek: Πέμπτη) mean "second", "third", "fourth", and "fifth", respectively. This leaves Sunday in the first position of the week count. Similarly in Portuguese, where the days from Monday to Friday are counted as "segunda-feira", "terça-feira", "quarta-feira", "quinta-feira" and "sexta-feira".

In Vietnamese, the working days in the week are named as: Thứ Hai (Second), Thứ Ba (Third), Thứ Tư (Fourth), Thứ Năm (Fifth), Thứ Sáu (Sixth), and Thứ Bảy (Seventh). Sunday is called "Chủ Nhật"(chữ Hán: 主日) meaning "Lord's Day". Some colloquial text in the south of Vietnam and from the church may use a different reading of "Chúa Nhật". In contemporary Vietnamese, "Chúa" means God or Lord and "Chủ" means own. The week still runs from Monday to Sunday. In German, Wednesday is called Mittwoch, literally "mid-week", implying the week runs from Sunday to Saturday.

In the Yoruba culture of West Africa, Sunday is called Oj̣ó ̣Aikú. Ojó Aiku is the day that begins a new week known as "Day of Rest". It is the day Orunmila, the convener of Ifá to earth, buried the mother of Esu Odara and his wife, Imi. Since that occurrence, Yoruba people decided to refer to the day as Ojó Aiku.

Slavic languages implicitly number Monday as day number one.

	Polish	Slovak	Czech	Ukrainian	Belarusian	Bulgarian	Russian	Serbian	Croatian	literal or derived meaning
Monday	poniedziałek	pondelok	pondělí	понеділок	панядзелак	понеделник	понедельник	ponedeljak / понедељак	ponedjeljak	(day) after not working
Tuesday	wtorek	utorok	úterý	вівторок	аўторак	вторник	вторник	utorak / уторак	utorak	second (day)
Wednesday	środa	streda	středa	середа	серада	сряда	среда	sreda / среда	srijeda	middle (day)
Thursday	czwartek	štvrtok	čtvrtek	четвер	чацвер	четвъртък	четверг	četvrtak / четвртак	četvrtak	fourth (day)
Friday	piątek	piatok	pátek	п'ятниця	пятніца	петък	пятница	petak / петак	petak	fifth (day)
Saturday	sobota	sobota	sobota	субота	субота	събота	суббота	subota / субота	subota	sabbath
Sunday	niedziela	nedela	neděle	неділя	нядзеля	неделя	воскресенье	nedelja / недеља	nedjelja	not working (day)

Russian воскресение (Sunday) means "resurrection". Hungarian szerda (Wednesday), csütörtök (Thursday), and péntek (Friday) are Slavic loanwords, so the correlation with "middle", "four", and "five" are not evident to Hungarian speakers. Hungarians use Vasárnap for Sunday, which means "market day".

In the Maltese language, due to its Siculo-Arabic origin, Sunday is called Il-Ħadd, a corruption of wieħed, meaning "one". Monday is It-Tnejn, meaning "two". Similarly, Tuesday is It-Tlieta (three), Wednesday is L-Erbgħa (four), and Thursday is Il-Ħamis (five).

In Armenian, Monday is Yerkoushabti, literally meaning "second day of the week", Tuesday Yerekshabti "third day", Wednesday Chorekshabti "fourth day", Thursday Hingshabti "fifth day". Saturday is Shabat coming from the word Sabbath or Shabbath in Hebrew, and Kiraki, coming from the word Krak, meaning "fire", is Sunday, referring to the sun as a fire. Apostle John, in Revelations 1:10, refers to the "Lord's Day", Greek: Κυριακή ἡμέρα (kyriakḗ hēmera), that is, "the day of the Lord", possibly influencing the Armenian word for Sunday.

In many European countries, calendars show Monday as the first day of the week, which follows the ISO 8601 standard.

In the Persian calendar, used in Iran and Afghanistan, Sunday is the second day of the week. However, it is called "number one" as counting starts from zero; the first day - Saturday - is denoted as day zero.

== Sunday in Christianity ==
=== Christian usage ===
The ancient Romans traditionally used the eight-day nundinal cycle, a market week, but in the time of Augustus in the 1st century AD, a seven-day week also came into use.

In the gospels, the women are described as coming to the empty tomb "εις μια των σαββατων", which literally means "toward the first of the sabbath" and is often translated "on the first day of the week".

Justin Martyr, in the mid-2nd century, mentions "memoirs of the apostles" as being read on "the day called that of the sun" (Sunday) alongside the "writings of the prophets." Some scholars believe this "was interpolated into his work at some later time".

On 7 March 321, Constantine I, Rome's first Christian emperor, decreed that Sunday would be observed as the Roman day of rest:

On the venerable Day of the Sun let the magistrates and people residing in cities rest, and let all workshops be closed. In the country, however, persons engaged in agriculture may freely and lawfully continue their pursuits; because it often happens that another day is not so suitable for grain-sowing or vine-planting; lest by neglecting the proper moment for such operations the bounty of heaven should be lost.

Despite the official adoption of Sunday as a day of rest by Constantine, the seven-day week and the nundinal cycle continued to be used side by side until at least the Calendar of 354 and probably later.

In 363, Canon 29 of the Council of Laodicea prohibited observance of the Jewish Sabbath (Saturday), and encouraged Christians to work on Saturday and rest on the Lord's Day (Sunday). The fact that the canon had to be issued at all is an indication that adoption of Constantine's decree of 321 was still not universal, not even among Christians. It also indicates that Jews were observing the Sabbath on Saturday.

=== Modern practices ===
First-day Sabbatarians, including Christians of the Methodist, Baptist and Reformed (Presbyterian and Congregationalist) traditions, observe Sunday as the sabbath, a day devoted to the worship of God at church (the attendance of Sunday School, a service of worship in the morning and evening), as well as a day of rest, meaning that people are free from servile labour and should refrain from trading, buying and selling except when necessary.

For most Christians the custom and obligation of Sunday rest is not as strict. A minority of Christians do not regard the day they attend church as important, so long as they attend. There is considerable variation in the observance of Sabbath rituals and restrictions, but some cessation of normal weekday activities is customary. Many Christians today observe Sunday as a day of church attendance.

In Roman Catholic practice, on Sundays, church members "are bound to come together into one place so that, by hearing the word of God and taking part in the eucharist, they may call to mind the passion, the resurrection and the glorification of the Lord Jesus". Liturgically, Sunday begins on Saturday evening. The evening Mass on Saturday is liturgically a full Sunday Mass and fulfills the obligation of Sunday Mass attendance, and Vespers (evening prayer) on Saturday night is liturgically "first Vespers" of the Sunday.

The same evening anticipation applies to other major solemnities and feasts, and is an echo of the Jewish practice of starting the new day at sunset. Those who work in the medical field, in law enforcement, and soldiers in a war zone are dispensed from the usual obligation to attend church on Sunday. They are encouraged to combine their work with attending religious services if possible.

In the Eastern Orthodox Church, Sunday begins at the Little Entrance of Vespers (or All-Night Vigil) on Saturday evening and runs until "Vouchsafe, O Lord" (after the "prokeimenon") of Vespers on Sunday night. During this time, the dismissal at all services begin with the words, "May Christ our True God, who rose from the dead ...." Anyone who wishes to receive Holy Communion at Divine Liturgy on Sunday morning is required to attend Vespers the night before (see Eucharistic discipline). Among Orthodox Christians, Sunday is considered to be a "Little Pascha" (Easter), and because of the Paschal joy, the making of prostrations is forbidden, except in certain circumstances.

Some languages lack separate words for "Saturday" and "Sabbath" (e.g. Italian, Portuguese). Outside the English-speaking world, Sabbath as a word, if it is used, refers to the Saturday, or the specific Jewish practices on it. Sunday is called the Lord's Day e.g. in Romance languages and Modern Greek. English-speaking Christians often refer to the Sunday as the Sabbath, other than Seventh-day Sabbatarians, a practice which, probably due to the international connections and the Latin tradition of the Roman Catholic Church, is more widespread among, but not limited to, Protestants. Quakers traditionally referred to Sunday as "First Day" eschewing the pagan origin of the English name, while referring to Saturday as the "Seventh day".

Some Christian denominations, called "Seventh-day Sabbatarians", observe a Saturday Sabbath. Christians in the Seventh-day Adventist, Seventh Day Baptist, and Church of God (Seventh-Day) denominations, as well as many Messianic Jews, have maintained the practice of abstaining from work and gathering for worship on Saturdays (sunset to sunset) as did all of the followers of God in the Old Testament.

== Sunday in Mandaeism ==
Sunday in Mandaeism is called Habshaba (Habšaba). Mandaeans perform communal masbuta (baptism) every Sunday.

== Common occurrences on Sunday ==
=== In government and business ===
In the United States and Canada, most government offices are closed on both Saturday and Sunday. The practice of offices closing on Sunday in government and in some rural areas of the United States stem from a system of blue laws. Blue laws were established in the early puritan days, which forbade secular activities on Sunday and were rigidly enforced. Some public activities are still regulated by these blue laws in the 21st century.

In 1985, twenty-two states in which religious fundamentalism remained strong maintained general restrictions on Sunday behavior. In Oklahoma, for example, it is stated: "Oklahoma's statutes state that "acts deemed useless and serious interruptions of the repose and religious liberty of the community," such as trades, manufacturing, mechanical employment, horse racing, and gaming are forbidden. Public selling of commodities other than necessary foods and drinks, medicine, ice, and surgical and burial equipment, and other necessities can legally be prohibited on Sunday. In Oklahoma, a fine not to exceed twenty-five dollars may be imposed on individuals for each offense." Because of these blue laws, many private sector retail businesses open later and close earlier on Sunday or do not open at all.

Many countries, particularly in Europe such as Sweden, France, Germany and Belgium, but also in other countries such as Peru, hold their national and local elections on a Sunday, either by law or by tradition.

=== In media ===
Many American and British daily newspapers publish a larger edition on Sundays, which often includes color comic strips, a magazine, and a coupon section. Others only publish on a Sunday, or have a "sister paper" with a different masthead that only publishes on a Sunday.

North American radio stations often play specialty radio shows such as Casey Kasem's countdown or other nationally syndicated radio shows that may differ from their regular weekly music patterns on Sunday morning or Sunday evening. In the United Kingdom, there is a Sunday tradition of chart shows on BBC Radio 1 and commercial radio; this originates in the broadcast of chart shows and other populist material on Sundays by Radio Luxembourg when the Reithian BBC's Sunday output consisted largely of solemn and religious programmes. The first Sunday chart show was broadcast on the Light Programme on 7 January 1962, which was considered a radical step at the time. BBC Radio 1's chart show moved to Fridays in July 2015 but a chart update on Sundays was launched in July 2019.

Period or older-skewing television dramas, such as Downton Abbey, Call the Midwife, Lark Rise to Candleford and Heartbeat are commonly shown on Sunday evenings in the UK; the first of these was Dr. Finlay's Casebook in the 1960s. Similarly, Antiques Roadshow has been shown on Sundays on BBC1 since 1979 and Last of the Summer Wine was shown on Sundays for many years until it ended in 2010. On Sundays, BBC Radio 2 plays music in styles which it once regularly played but which are now rarely heard on the station, with programmes such as Elaine Paige on Sunday and Sunday Night is Music Night although more contemporary styles now make up a higher percentage of the station's Sunday output than previously; for example, Kendrick Lamar received a Sunday-night play on the station in March 2022. Even younger-skewing media outlets sometimes skew older on Sundays within the terms of their own audience; for example, BBC Radio 1Xtra introduced an "Old Skool Sunday" schedule in the autumn of 2019.

Many American, Australian and British television networks and stations also broadcast their political interview shows on Sunday mornings.

=== In sports ===
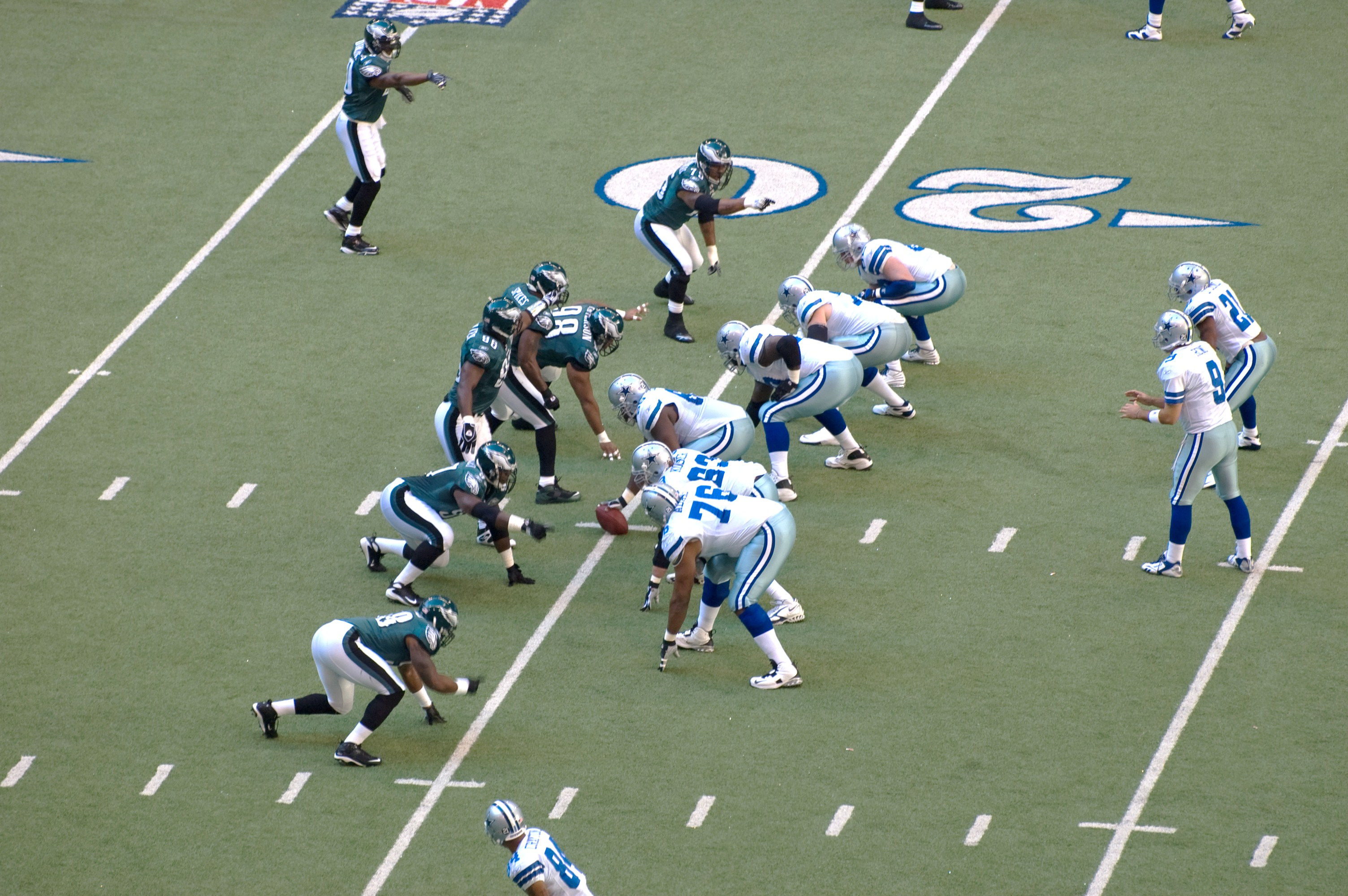
In the United States, National Football League games are usually played on Sunday

Major League Baseball usually schedules all Sunday games in the daytime except for the nationally televised Sunday Night Baseball matchup. Certain historically religious cities such as Boston and Baltimore among others will schedule games no earlier than 1:35 PM to ensure time for people who go to religious service in the morning can get to the game in time.

In the United States, professional American football in the National Football League is usually played on Sunday, although Saturday (via Saturday Night Football), Monday (via Monday Night Football), and Thursday (via Thursday Night Football or Thanksgiving) see some professional games. College football usually occurs on Saturday, and high-school football tends to take place on Friday night or Saturday afternoon.

In the UK, some club and Premier League football matches and tournaments usually take place on Sundays. Rugby matches and tournaments usually take place in club grounds or parks on Sunday mornings. It is not uncommon for church attendance to shift on days when a late morning or early afternoon game is anticipated by a local community.

The Indian Premier League schedules two games on Saturdays and Sundays instead of one, also called Double-headers.

One of the remains of religious segregation in the Netherlands is seen in amateur football: The Saturday-clubs are by and large Protestant Christian clubs, who were not allowed to play on Sunday. The Sunday-clubs were in general Catholic and working class clubs, whose players had to work on Saturday and therefore could only play on Sunday.

In Ireland, Gaelic football and hurling matches are predominantly played on Sundays, with the first (previously second) and fourth (previously third) Sundays in September always playing host to the All-Ireland hurling and football championship finals, respectively.

Professional golf tournaments traditionally end on Sunday. Traditionally, those in the United Kingdom ended on Saturday, but this changed some time ago; for example, the Open ran from Wednesday to Saturday up to 1979 but has run from Thursday to Sunday since 1980.

In the United States and Canada, National Basketball Association and National Hockey League games, which are usually played at night during the week, are frequently played during daytime hours - often broadcast on national television.

Most NASCAR Cup Series and IndyCar events are held on Sundays. Most Formula One World Championship races are likewise held on Sundays regardless of time zone/country, while MotoGP holds most races on Sundays, with Middle Eastern races being the exception on Saturday. All Formula One events and MotoGP events with Sunday races involve qualifying taking place on Saturday.

== Astrology ==
Sunday is associated with the Sun and is symbolized by the symbol ☉.

== Named days ==
- Advent Sunday – First day of liturgical year and start of the season of Advent
- Black Sunday
- Bloody Sunday
- Cold Sunday – 1982 meteorological event
- Easter Sunday – Commemoration of the resurrection of Jesus Christ
- Gaudete Sunday – Among the Western Christian Churches, the third Sunday of Advent
- Gloomy Sunday – 1933 single by Rezső Seress
- Good Shepherd Sunday
- Laetare Sunday – Fourth Sunday in the season of Lent
- Low Sunday, also known as Octave of Easter, White Sunday, Quasimodo Sunday, Alb Sunday, Antipascha Sunday, and Divine Mercy Sunday – Western Christianity celebration
- Passion Sunday – Fifth Sunday in Lent, the beginning of Passiontide (since 1970 for Roman Catholics in the ordinary form of the rite, the term remains only official among the greater title of the Palm Sunday, which used to be also the "2nd Sunday of Passiontide")
- Palm Sunday – Christian moveable feast preceding Easter
- Selection Sunday – American collegiate basketball tournament process
- Septuagesima, Sexagesima and Quinquagesima Sunday are the last three Sundays before Lent. Quinquagesima ("fiftieth"), is the fiftieth day before Easter, reckoning inclusively; but Sexagesima is not the sixtieth day and Septuagesima is not the seventieth but is the sixty-fourth day prior. The use of these terms was abandoned by the Catholic Church in the 1970 calendar reforms (the Sundays before Lent are now simply "Sundays in ordinary time" with no special status). However, their use is still continued in Lutheran tradition: for example, "Septuagesimae".
- Shavuot – Jewish holiday - the Jewish Pentecost, or 'Festival of Weeks'. For Karaite Jews it always falls on a Sunday.
- Stir-up Sunday – Last Sunday before Advent
- Super Bowl Sunday – National Football League championship game
- Trinity Sunday – Western Christian feast day
- Whitsun, also known as Whitsunday or White Sunday – Name for Christian holy day of Pentecost

== See also ==
- After Saturday Comes Sunday – Middle Eastern proverb
- Saint Kyriakē – Greek saint (died 289 CE)
- Sol Invictus – Late Roman solar deity
- Sunday Christian – Description of a specific type of Christian
- Sunday (computer virus) – Logic bomb DOS computer virus
- Sunday league football – Amateur association football competitions
- Sunday roast – British dish of meat and vegetables
- Sunday scaries – Anxiety about the start of the working week
- Sunday shopping – Ability of retailers to operate stores on Sunday

== Sources ==
- Barnhart, Robert K. (1995). The Barnhart Concise Dictionary of Etymology. HarperCollins. ISBN 0-06-270084-7
