= Vladimir Pozner =

Vladimir Pozner may refer to

- Vladimir Pozner Jr. (born 1934), French-born Russian-American journalist and broadcaster
- Vladimir Pozner Sr. (1908–1975), Soviet spy
- Vladimir Pozner (writer) (1905–1992), French writer and translator, cousin of Vladimir Pozner Sr.
