= Victoria Mercanton =

French film director and editor

Victoria Mercanton in 1989

Victoria Mercanton, or Victoria Spiri-Mercanton (1911–2007), was a French film editor and director, born Viktoria Aleksandrovna Pozner (Russian: Виктория Александровна Познер) on 25 January [O.S. 12 January] 1911, in Saint Petersburg, Russia, active from the 1930s to 1970s.

Known as Toto, she was a frequent collaborator on the films of Roger Vadim since his directorial debut in 1956 with And God Created Woman.

After surviving a couple of disastrous fires of nitrate film in the editing suite - including one which claimed the life of a director sitting next to her — Mercanton successfully lobbied the government to legislate that the French film industry switch to safety film by the mid-1950s. She flippantly explained to Vadim, "You understand, I wanted to be able to smoke my Gauloises while working."

== Family ==
Daughter of Russian Jews Aleksandr and Elizaveta Pozner. Her family fled Soviet Russia after the Bolshevik Revolution.

- Husband — film editor Roger Spiri-Mercanton
- Brother — Vladimir Aleksandrovich Pozner
- Nephew — Vladimir Pozner
