= Censorship in Russia =

Censorship is controlled by the Government of Russia and by civil society in the Russian Federation, applying to the content and the diffusion of information, printed documents, music, works of art, cinema and photography, radio and television, web sites and portals, and in some cases private correspondence, with the aim of limiting or preventing the dissemination of ideas and information that the Russian state or public opinion consider to be a danger.

Russian Federation legislation on the mass media defines censorship as a "requirement, vis-à-vis media editors, officials, state bodies, organizations, institutions or public associations, to coordinate, prior to their distribution, the messages and documents to be broadcast as well as the obligation to prohibit, where appropriate, their broadcast in whole or in part".

The constitution of the Russian Federation prohibits censorship in paragraph 5 of Article 29. However, there are in fact many cases of censorship of works and limitation of the freedom to disseminate information from the public authorities, public organizations, and groups of citizens who feel offended and organize their self-defense. There are also two cases of censorship by local authorities—in 2006 and 2012—which have been recognized by Russian courts as such.

== General problems of censorship in Russia ==
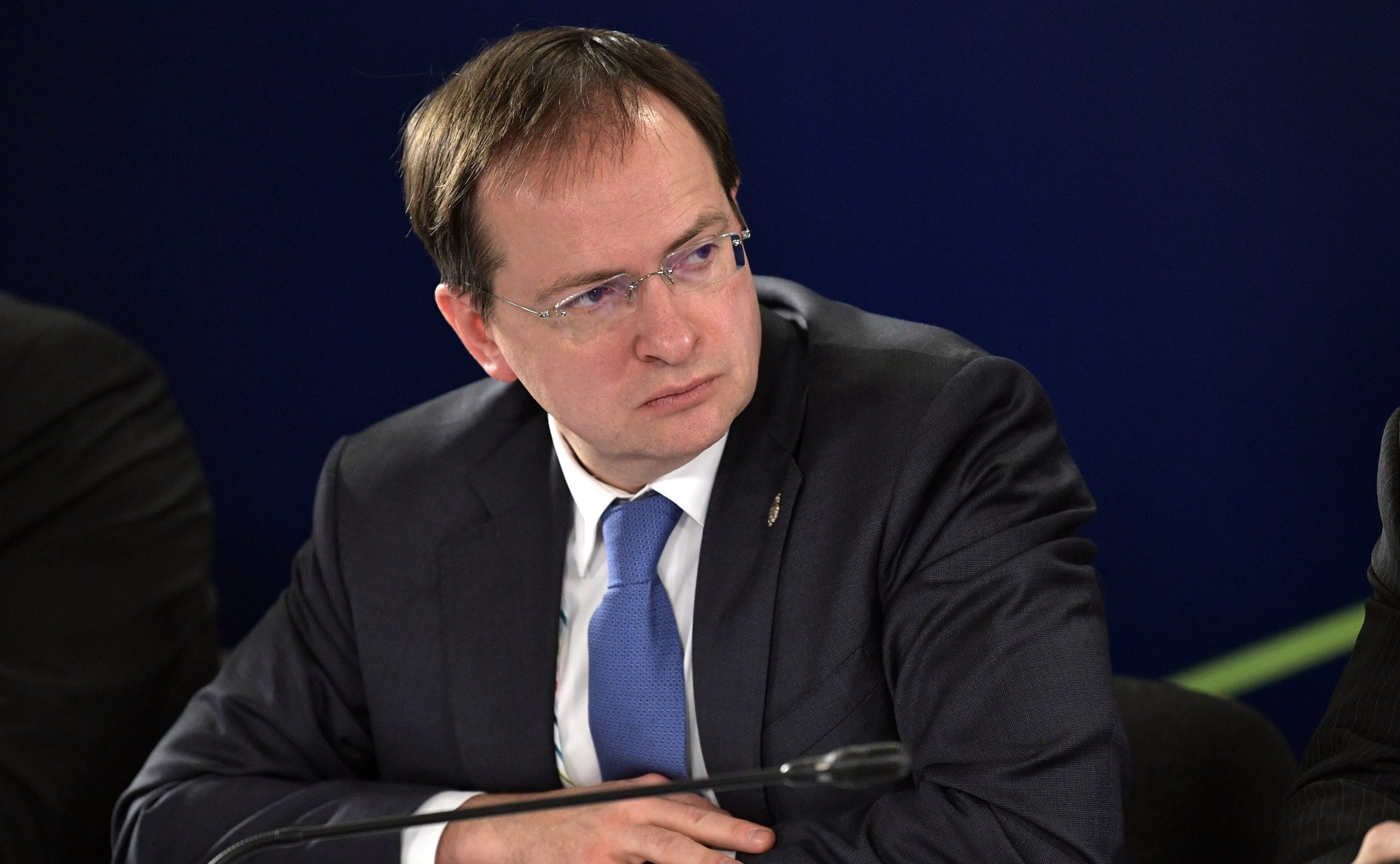
Vladimir Medinsky 2017, Minister of Culture of Russia

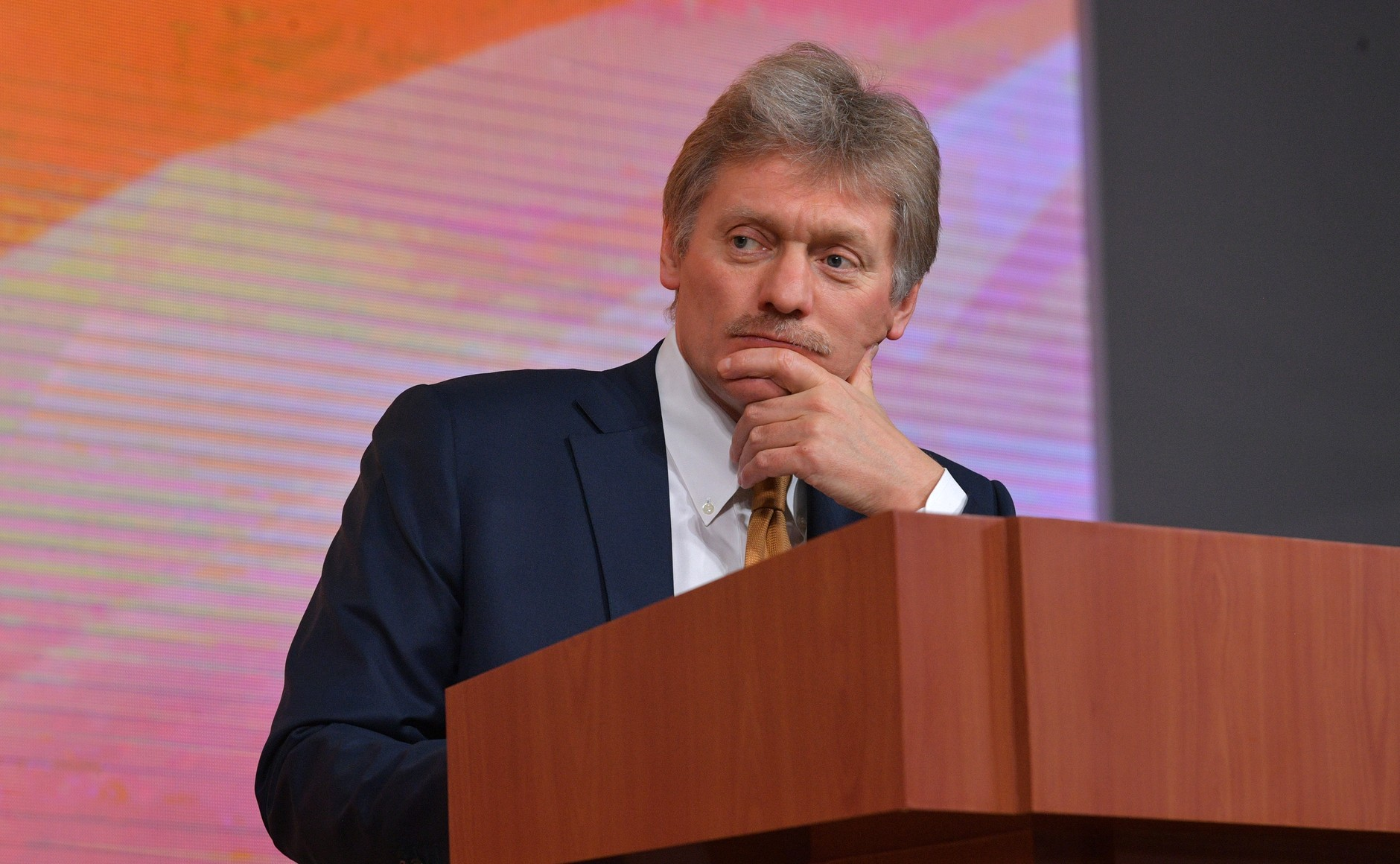
Dmitry Peskov, spokesperson of the Russian presidency

=== Subject matter and agenda ===
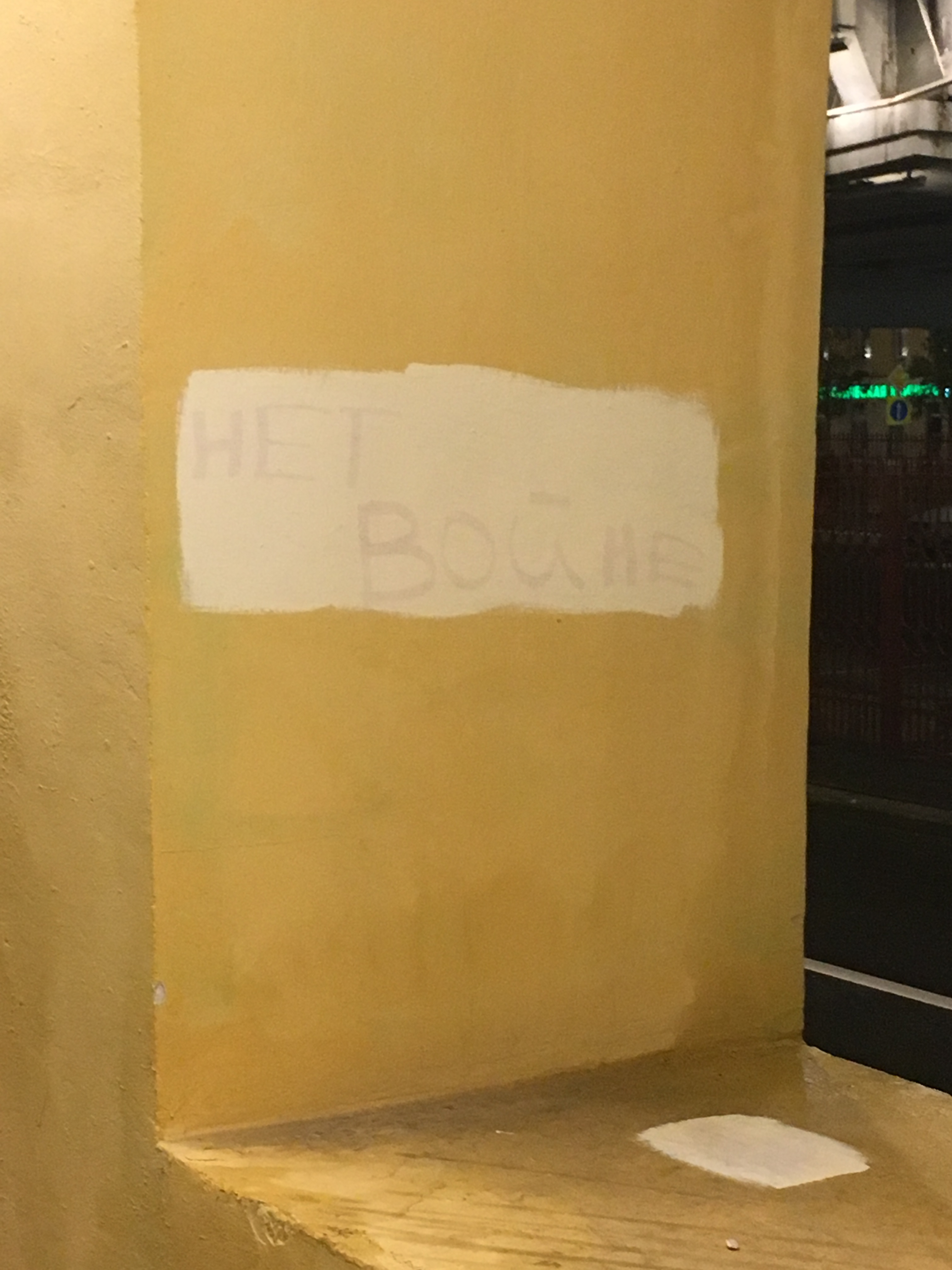
Since February 2022 all Nyet voynye! signs in Moscow are urgently painted over by municipal services shortly after apparition.

In March 2008, Vladimir Vladimirovich Pozner, a journalist with the Russian state television channel Perviy Kanal, speaking at a meeting of the Russian Citizens' Federation on the issues of morals and ethics on national television, said that there is no freedom of expression in Russia. In 2011, Pozner acknowledged that there was a stop-list on Russian television, that is to say a list of names of people who should not be invited to television. Thus, since 2010, access to federal television has been made inaccessible to Boris Nemtsov, Garry Kasparov, Mikhail Kasyanov, Edward Limonov, Alexey Navalny. According to journalist and politician Alexander Nevzorov, 2014 was the year in which censorship reached its highest level during the post-Soviet period. "It's magical, violent, insane and stupid in the highest degree.". Sarkis Dabrinian agrees with him as a defender of human rights: "Censorship is back in the country" (June 2014). In June 2015, Izvestia publishes an article of the Minister of Culture, Vladimir Medinsky, entitled "Who does not feed his culture, will go to feed the foreign army ". At the head of the article, the Minister of Culture declares that the state must not only subsidize culture, but also follow the content created through these subsidies, and systematically encourage only projects that reflect the values of the conservative majority of the world population. Medinski emphasizes the negative effect in Russia of political censorship and considers that the role of the bureaucracy is to guarantee the financial, administrative and legal viability of the rules according to which the state does not limit the artist in his creation, but controls if its production is not offensive to citizens. As an instructive example, the minister cited the dismissal of the director of the Novosibirsk Opera and Ballet Theater Boris Mesdritch, after the scandal of Timofei Kuliabin's staging of Richard Wagner's opera Tannhäuser (opera).

Russia has put in place a special procedure for productions and productions that are inscribed or withdrawn from the state budget accounts, and the fact is also that the State orders works on theme, says Dmitry Peskov, spokesman for the President of Russia. Reacting to these ministerial directives, director Andrei Zvyagintsev said in October 2016 that: "Orderly officials castrate artistic creation". The laureate of the Venice Film Festival and the Cannes Film Festival call Peskov's principles of public art market rules, which means that officials spend state money on films and performances in the interests of the public. of the state itself. With this conception, Dmitry Peskov forgets it is not their money available to its officials, but taxpayers' money. They decided once and for all that they knew better what people need than these people themselves and pay miserable productions with taxpayers' money. Armen Djigarkhanian calls censorship, the financial dependence of Russian theater that significantly influences the repertoire.

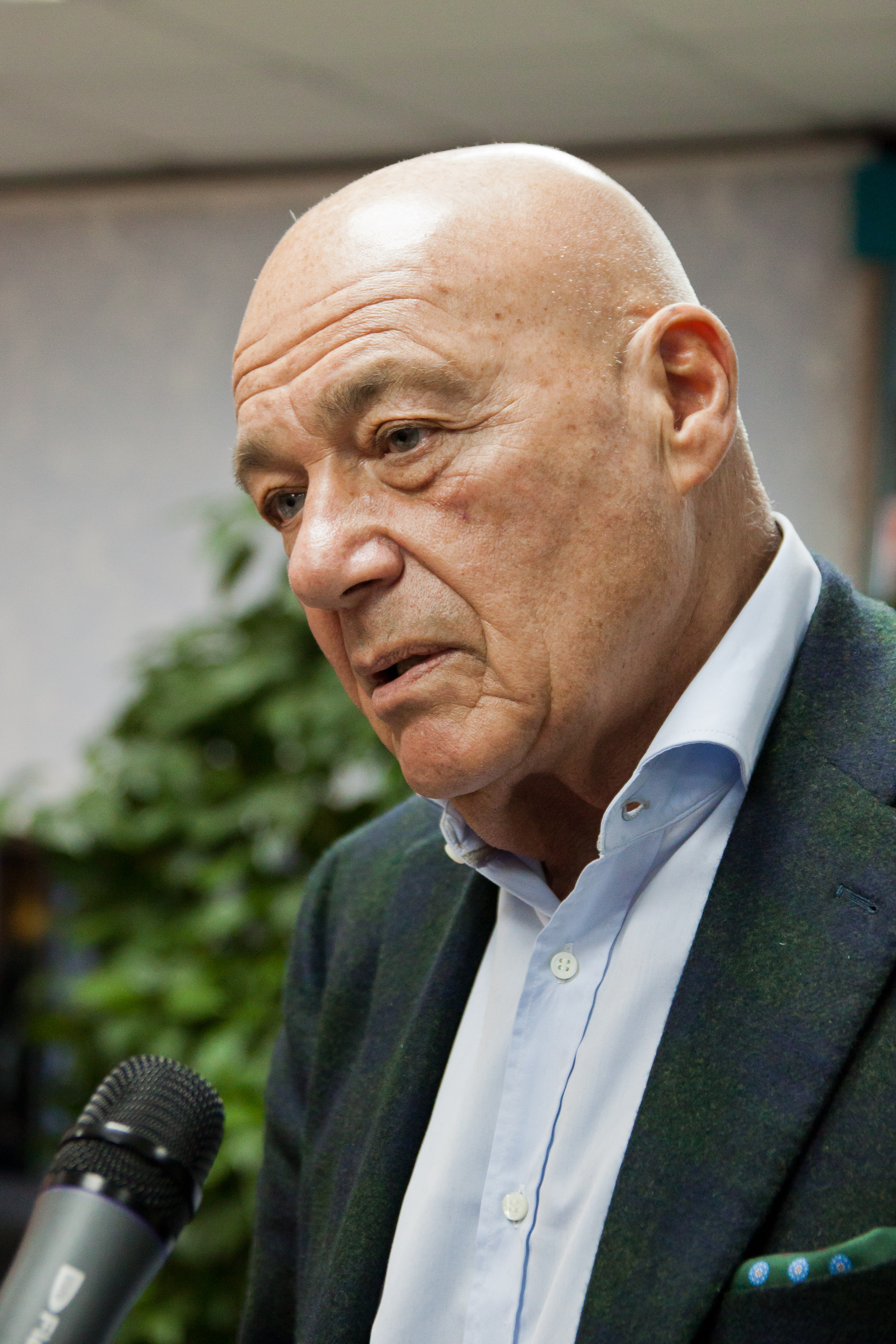
Vladimir Posner 2013

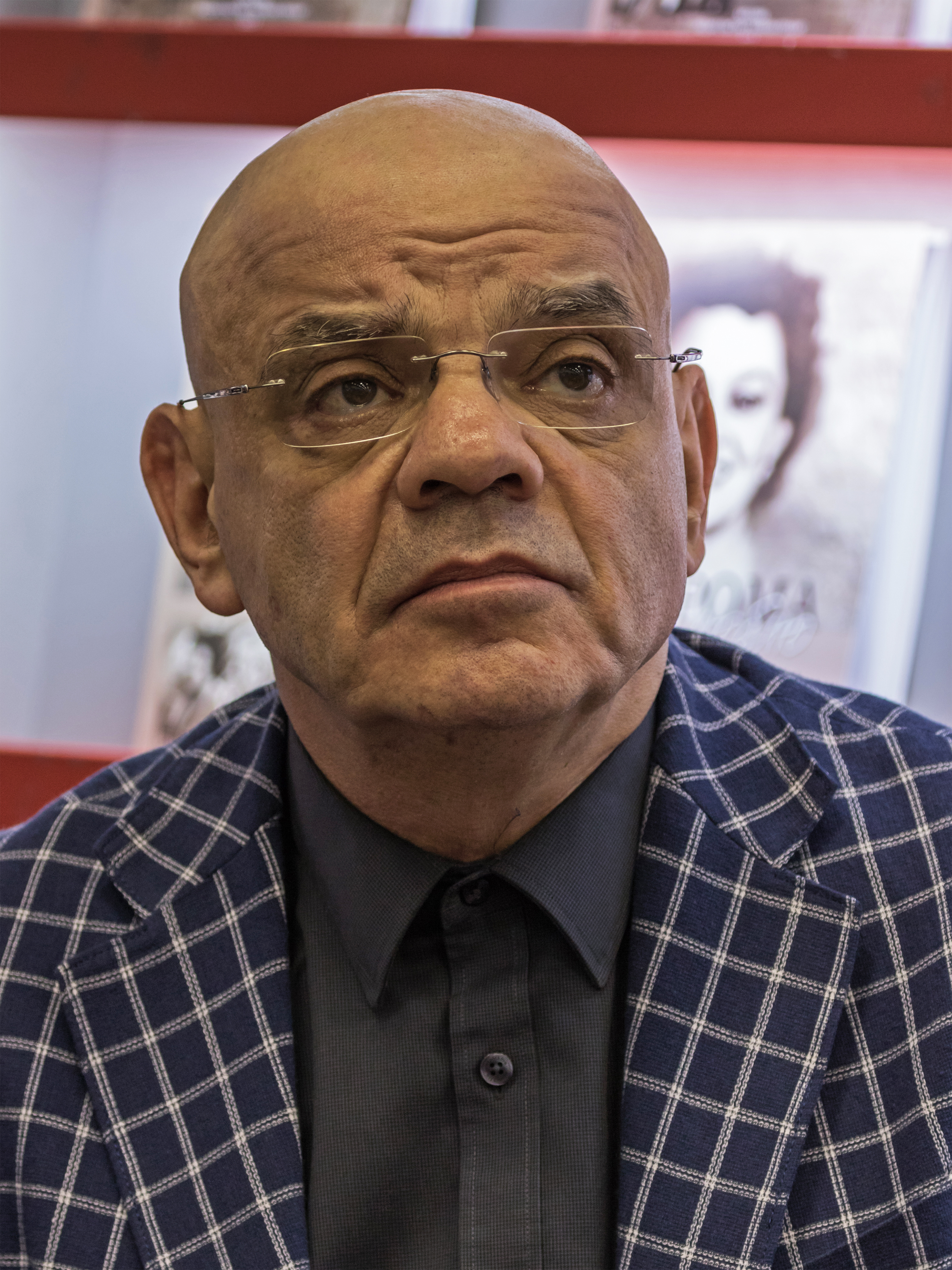
Konstantin Raikin, actor, stage director

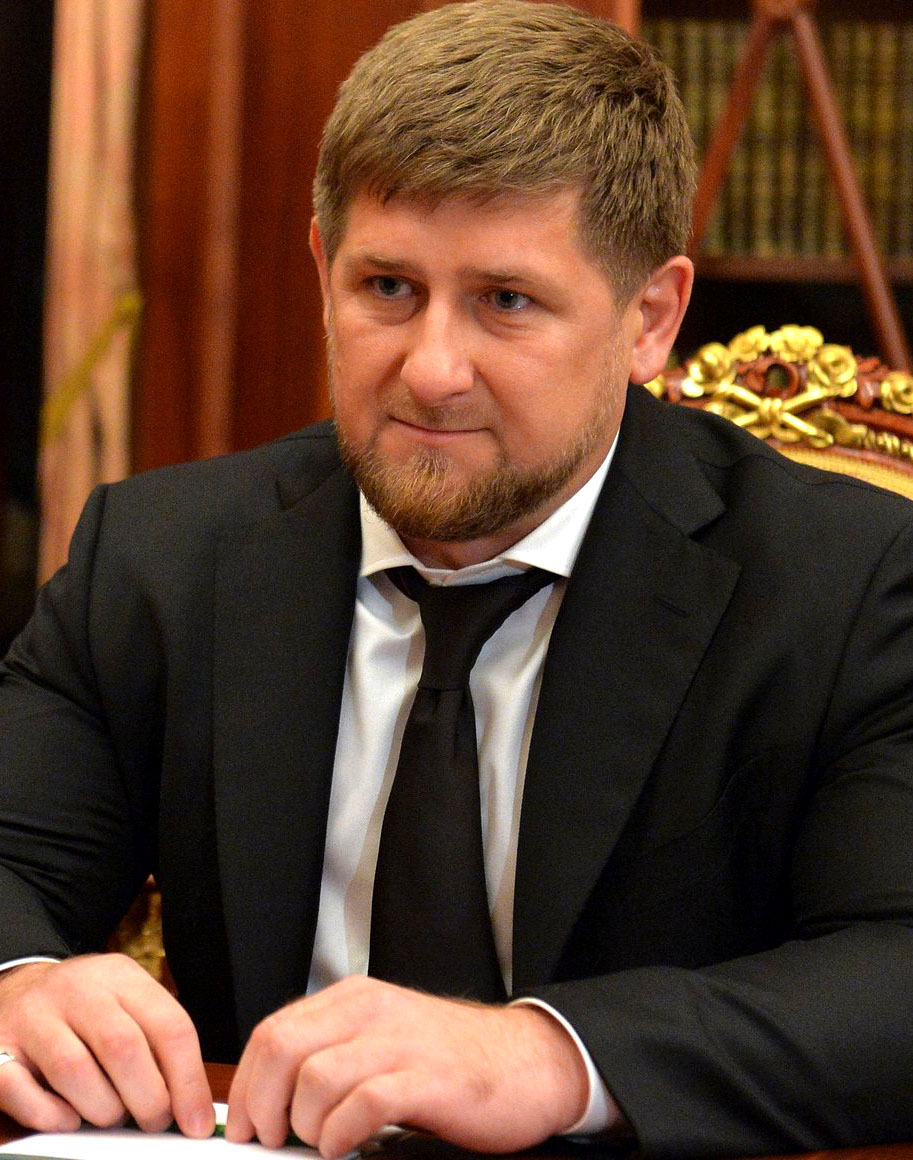
Ramzan Kadyrov, Chechen politician 2014

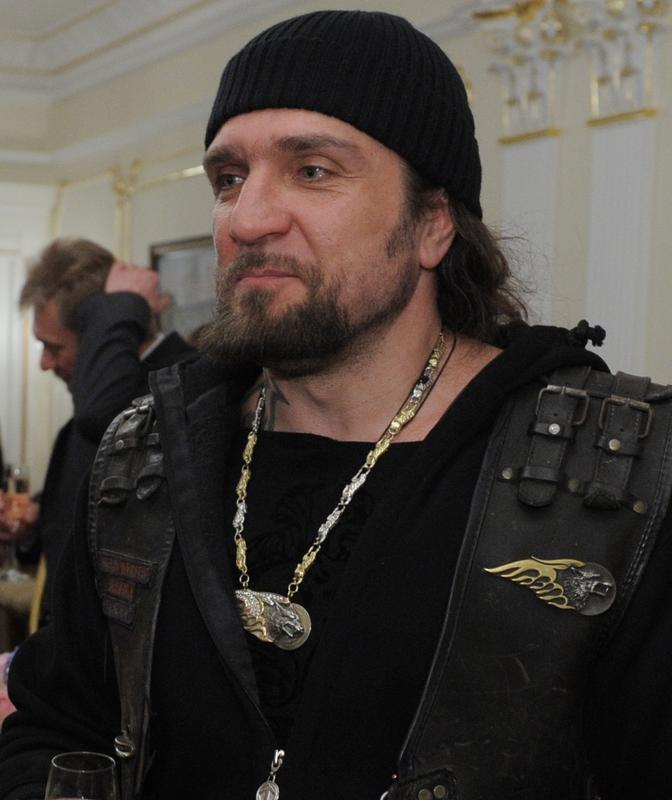
Alexander Zaldostanov (biker)

== Media, communication and education controls ==
2025 World Press Freedom Index Good: 85–100 points Satisfactory: 70–85 points Problematic: 55–70 points Difficult: 40–55 points Very serious <40 points Not classified

In October 2016, at the Congress of the Union of Theater Artists of Russia, Konstantin Raikin condemned the interference of the State, public organizations and groups of citizens offended in the cultural life of the country under the guise of the words Patrie, spirituality, morality. He describes these phenomena as a return to Russia of the infamous censorship of Stalin's time in the USSR.

There are people in Russia who say they are offended and try to tell the artists what to do. This is reflected by the popular artist of the USSR Oleg Tabakov. About this public censorship he notes that "these people got the idea that if the government does not censor, then they have to control the art themselves". Tabakov is convinced that the methods of these spies of censorship do not create the conditions for the appearance of an appropriate art. The censorship of Russian creativity against Raikin, Zviaginsev and Tabakov was also condemned by Vladimir Vladimirovich Pozner, Yevgeny Mironov (actor) and Sergey Bezrukov. The problems related to the arrival of censorship and the moralization of artistic creation were discussed in November 2016, at a meeting of theater directors, at the deputy director of the Administration of the President of Russia, Sergei Kirienko. Among the statements of support for censorship media attention has focused on the provocative statements of biker Aleksandr Zaldostanov and those of Ramzan Kadyrov at the head of Chechnya. The idea that Zaldostanov wants to pass is that freedom is only a scheming of the spirit of evil: "The devil always wants to try by freedom! But under the guise of this freedom Raikin wants to turn the country into a sewage dump. He is supported by Kadyrov unhappy that "a certain caste arrogates to itself the right to offend the religious feelings of tens of millions of Orthodox and Muslims by stating that in art everything is allowed".

On 1 August 2014, the bloggers law came into effect, which, even after the adoption of another text, makes it possible to apply prison sentences for extreme cases.

The Freedom House organization ranks Russia in countries where the internet is not free. According to this organization, the situation of the Russian Internet (Rounet) tends to worsen in the area of censorship. The main restrictions on the Internet in the Russian Federation are related to anti-terrorism measures. Censorship monitors and blocks, where appropriate, LGBT communications, Donbas-related topics, extra-parliamentary political opposition, nationalist-oriented messages, and child pornography. All over Russia, according to the same organization, blockages of unwanted sites occur, destruction of their content, pressure from political and economic authorities on online publications, or even cyberattacks against independent media31. About 60% of Russians believe that censorship is essential, but only 25% of respondents for personal websites and publications, according to the Levada Analytical Center. The number of supporters of censorship on the internet tends to grow in Russia.

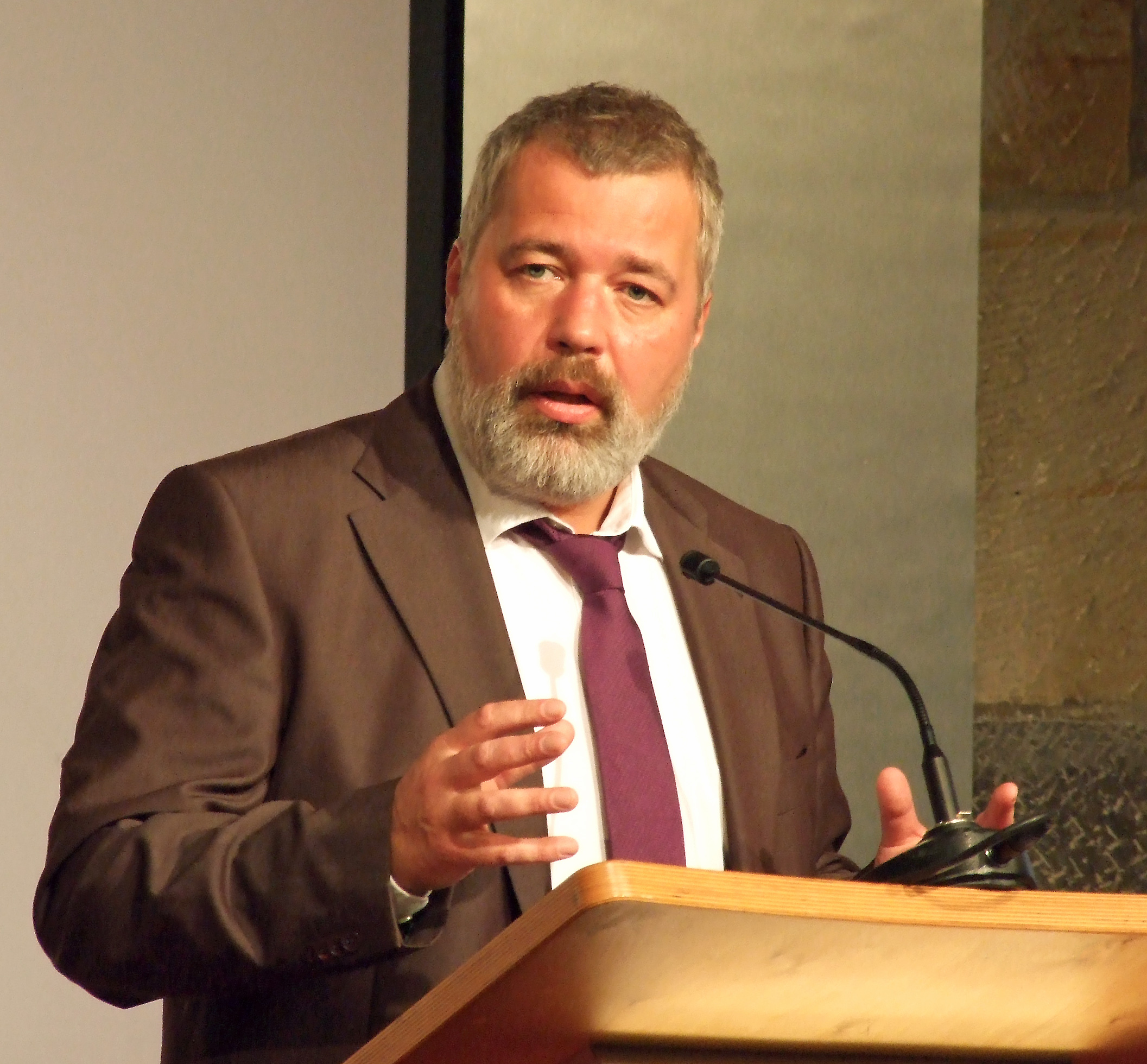
Novaya Gazeta's editor-in-chief Dmitry Muratov was awarded the 2021 Nobel Peace Prize for his "efforts to safeguard freedom of expression". In March 2022, Novaya Gazeta suspended its print activities after receiving a second warning from Roskomnadzor.

In November 2016, the Minister of Culture of Russia, Vladimir Medinsky said that in Russia, there is no form of censorship and that the discussions on this issue come from the financial, family, creativity of prominent people in the culture Russian.

On 2 December 2016, at a joint meeting of the Council for Culture and Arts and the Council for the Russian Language, President Vladimir Putin states that "the principle of the freedom of artistic creation is absolutely immutable". He considers that "attempts to interrupt performances and exhibitions are totally unacceptable and he guarantees that force will remain in the law to prevent such acts". At the same time, Putin reminds artists that there is a border between the offending epate and the artistic activity.

On 4 March 2022, Russian President Vladimir Putin signed into law a bill introducing prison sentences of up to 15 years for those who publish "knowingly false information" about the Russian military and its operations, leading to some media outlets in Russia to stop reporting on Ukraine or shutting down their media outlet. Although the 1993 Russian Constitution has an article expressly prohibiting censorship, the Russian censorship apparatus Roskomnadzor ordered the country's media to only use information from Russian state sources or face fines and blocks.

As of December 2022, more than 4,000 people were prosecuted under "fake news" laws in connection with the Russian invasion of Ukraine. Hugh Williamson, Europe and Central Asia director at Human Rights Watch, said that "These new laws are part of Russia's ruthless effort to suppress all dissent and make sure the [Russian] population does not have access to any information that contradicts the Kremlin's narrative about the invasion of Ukraine." In February 2023, Russian journalist Maria Ponomarenko was sentenced to six years in prison for publishing information about the Mariupol theatre airstrike.

At least 1,000 Russian journalists have fled Russia since February 2022.

In early June 2022, the Svetlogorsk City Court in the Kaliningrad region ruled that a list of Russian soldiers killed in Ukraine, published by privately owned news websites, constituted "classified information" and its publication could be considered a criminal offense.

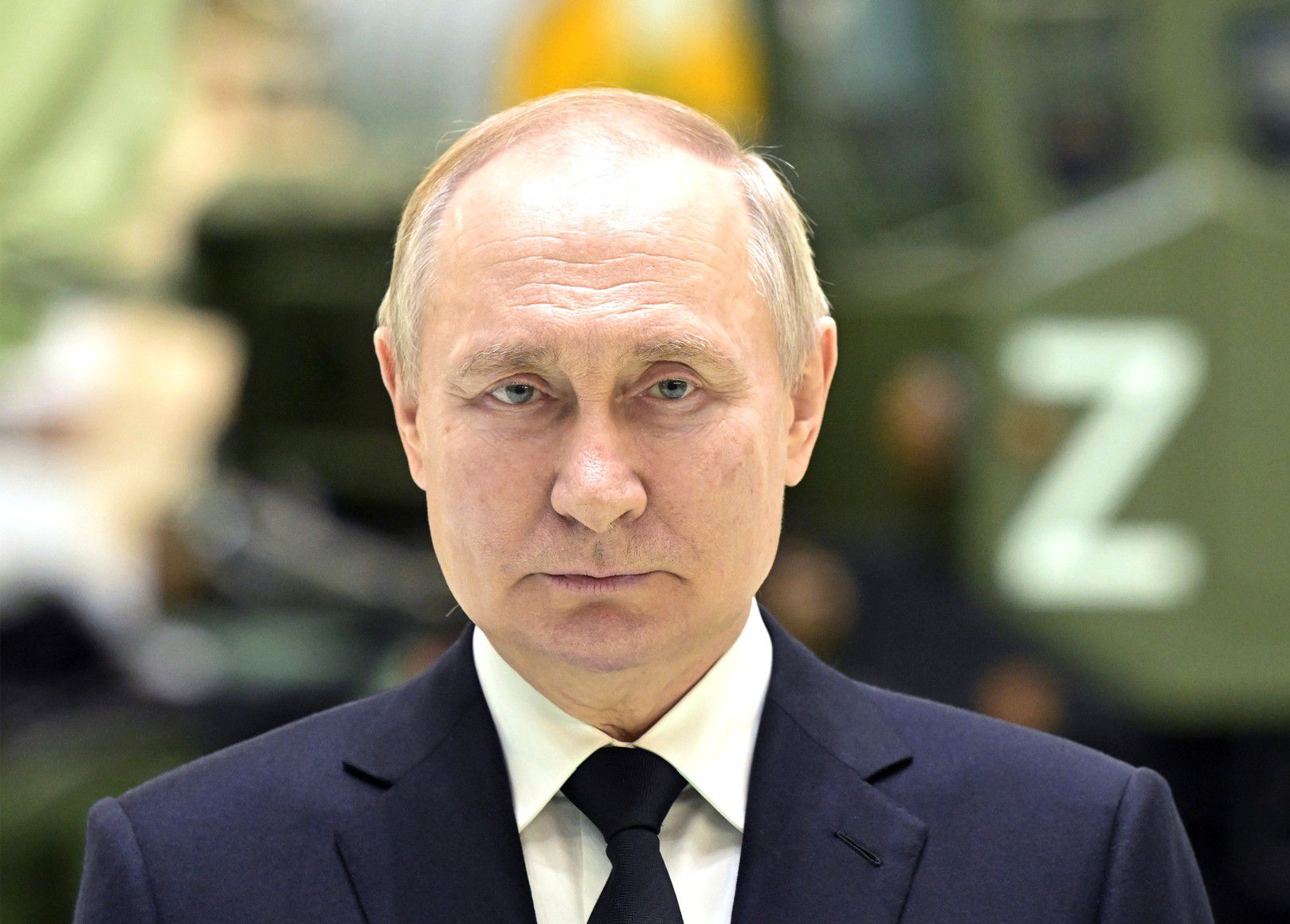
In September 2024, Vladimir Putin claimed that freedom of speech and freedom of the press are fully respected in Russia.

On 5 September 2022, Russian journalist Ivan Safranov was sentenced to 22 years in prison in relation to the "treason" charges. Russian daily newspaper Kommersant called the charges of treason "absurd". In June 2019, Kommersant was accused in Russian courts with disclosing state secrets; according to BBC News, the case was based on an article co-authored by Safronov about Russian sales of fighter jets to Egypt.

In March 2024, Russian authorities arrested six journalists working for independent Russian outlets, including Antonina Favorskaya, who worked for Sota.Vision and filmed the last video of Alexei Navalny before his death. Sergey Lukashevsky, director of the Sakharov Center, told DW that "Independent journalism in Russia is, in fact, absolutely prohibited. All really independent media have to work from abroad."

In April 2024, Russian journalists Konstantin Gabov and Sergey Karelin, who had worked for Deutsche Welle and other international media in the past, were arrested by Russian authorities on charges of "extremism". Forbes Russia journalist Sergey Mingazov was arrested on charges of spreading "false information" about the Russian military.

In September 2024, in an interview with the Mongolian newspaper Onoodor, Vladimir Putin claimed that freedom of speech and freedom of the press were flourishing in Russia, saying "We are well aware of the need for pluralism and openness". Putin said the media is free in Russia, but journalists must obey the law.

== Censorship on television ==
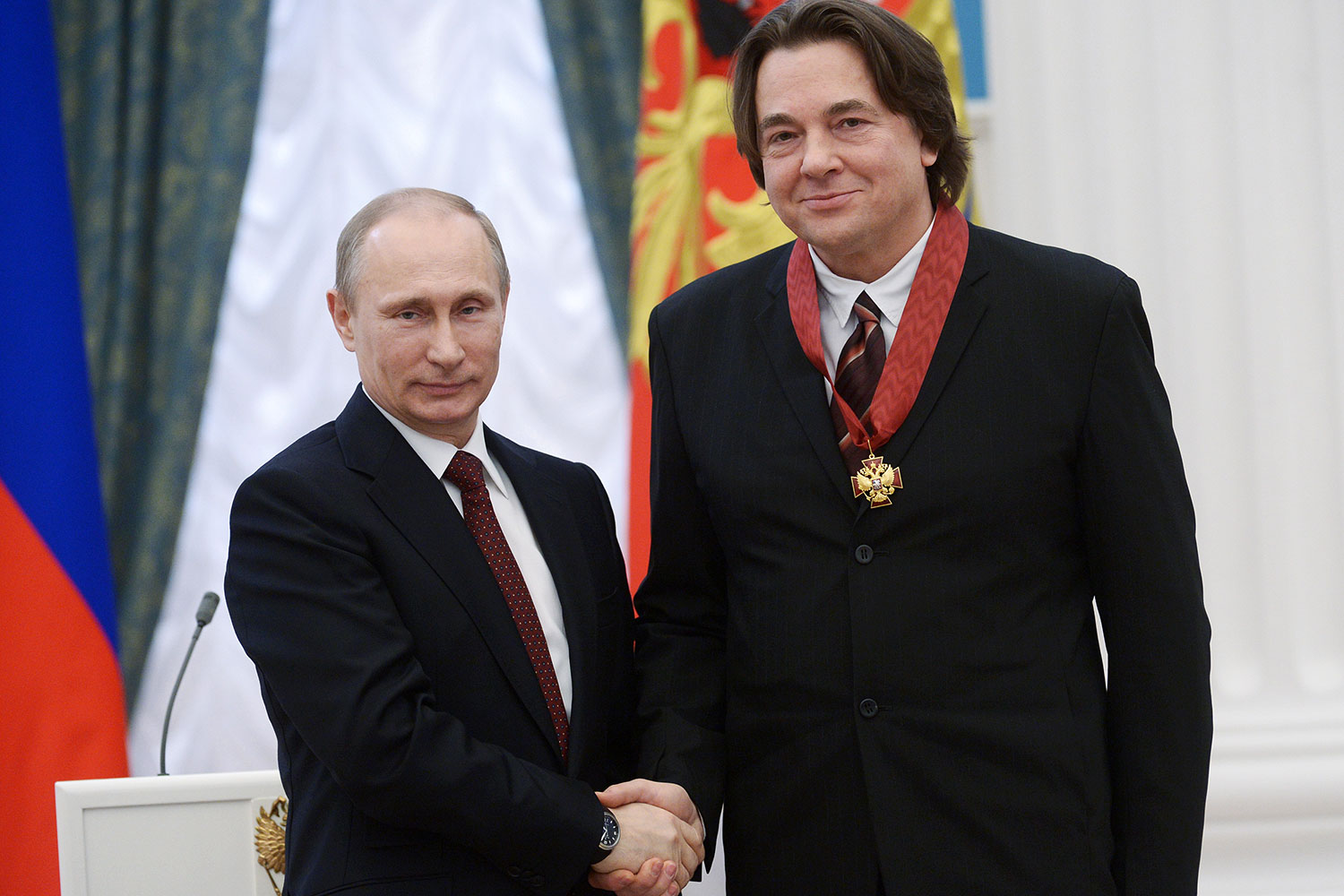
Putin and Konstantin Ernst, chief of Russia's main state-controlled TV station Channel One. About two-thirds of Russians use television as their primary source of daily news.

The level of political censorship of the television is very high, considers the cinema critic Evguena Petrovskaya. Television does not cover the mass protests of December 2011 in a timely manner and only communicates them after one week35. On Russian television, there is no political satire (satire is an important sign of democracy) because power does not accept that on television. This is what caused the problems of the NTV (Russia) after presenting a doll in the image of Putin in a show of the style Guignols info.

On 25 November 2010, during the award ceremony of the Vladislav Listiev Prize, presenter Leonid Parfyonov analyzed the situation of censorship on TV in Russia. According to Parfyonov, criticism of senior state officials has become impossible, and the authorities are only represented in the funeral tradition. Or you have to talk about them for good or nothing.

Media attention has also turned to censorship of private facts related to film production by federal television channels. In June 2013 the director, screenwriter Nikolai Dostal (Ru) sends an open letter to the director general of the Pan-Russian State TV and Radio Company VGTRK Oleg Dobrodeev (Ru), about the broadcast of his film The Disciplinary Battalion (Chtrafbat) on "Rossiya 1". According to Dostal, throughout his film words were roughly deleted even in a prisoner prison song. Several sexual scenes have been cut. Dostal points out that all cases of disrespect for the film's author are not recorded and that he feels bitterness and shame in the face of such coarse, petty and hypocritical censorship.

Director Vladimir Mirsoev also faced censorship. The second channel bought the movie The Man Who Knew Everything, in which he participated as director and co-producer. During the broadcast, the key phrase "I am your bitch" was needed to understand the plot, but it was removed and no one asked for permission. Mirsoev considers censorship on television comes from the direction of the chain. According to the director, the special services also monitor television and the artistic truth seems a very hard notion to accept by these people. Filmmakers have to take their side of censorship, as their only real chance to break through and make money is to sell their film to the federal channel.

In July 2013, Rossiya 24 deputy editor Alexander Orlov claimed that he had been fired for publishing social media support for opponent Alexei Navalny.

In December 2016, presenter Konstantin Syomin said that cuts had been made by Petersburg TV-5 of the epic film Liberation, for political and ideological reasons. Among these cuts, some concerned the evocation of Joseph Stalin in a positive light.

The Russian censorship apparatus Roskomnadzor ordered media organizations to delete stories that describe the 2022 Russian invasion of Ukraine as an "assault", "invasion", or a "declaration of war". Roskomnadzor launched an investigation against the Novaya Gazeta, Echo of Moscow, inoSMI, MediaZona, New Times, TV Rain, and other Russian media outlets for publishing "inaccurate information about the shelling of Ukrainian cities and civilian casualties in Ukraine as a result of the actions of the Russian Army". On 1 March 2022, Russian authorities blocked access to Echo of Moscow and TV Rain, Russia's last independent TV station, claiming that they were spreading "deliberately false information about the actions of Russian military personnel" as well as "information calling for extremist activity" and "violence".

== Cinema censorship ==
One of the first cases of censorship in the history of Russian cinema in the Russian Federation is the protest by the Russian Orthodox Church against the broadcast, on 30 May 1997, by the NTV television deeply believing and Catholic director, Martin Scorsese, The Last Temptation of Christ. At the request of the Orthodox Church, the broadcast has been postponed for several months, finally taking place on 9 November 1997. As part of the broadcast, Patriarch Alexy II of Moscow holds a press conference in Moscow under the influence anger. A brochure The Antichrist in Moscow, devoted entirely to the diffusion of the film and the events related to it, is distributed. The film is described as the most blasphemous film created in the last decade. The magnitude of unprecedented blasphemy, the pamphlet says, is proven by the tens of millions of people who are affected by the film. During the 2012 expert appraisal, experts from the Russian Institute of Culture, however, found nothing in Scorsese's film that could be criticized.

A new wave of censorship is emerging, which is linked to the policy led by the Minister of Culture Vladimir Medinski, from his appointment to this post in 2012. The film critic, former director of the Guild of film critics, Russian filmmaker Viktor Matisen is provided as an example of refusal to broadcast for censorship the movie Clip of the director Maï Miloche and the film Order of forgetting of the director Hussein Erkenov, but also the requirements of modification of the scenario of the project of Alexander Mindadze Gentil Hans, dear Piotr (Милый Ганс, дорогой Петр), considered as a factual modification of the constitutional rules on censorship. Adopted in 2014, the law prohibiting the use of uncensored (obscene) language is applicable in cinemas and is interpreted as an introduction to censorship in Russia. According to these new requirements, director and director Valeria Gaï Germanica's film Yes and Yes ("Да и да") saw its dialogues changed to become law-abiding, while the non-standard vocabulary was part of the artistic conception of melodrama and was dictated by the content and logic of the developed subject.

In November 2014, the Ministry of Culture of the Russian Federation refused to fund the Artdokfest International Documentary Film Festival. His reasons are based on the fact that the festival's president, director Vitali Manski, would be, according to the minister, an opponent of the state from a political point of view. Minister Medinski said he would not be funding the festival for as long as he was minister of culture. On the other hand, in October 2016, there was the premiere of the film Twenty-eight Panfilovs (in), whose scenario is based on the story of the exploits of the twenty-eight Panfilovs, a holy Soviet legend of the Second World War. The Ministry of Culture financially supported this project. On 4 November 2016, the film went on the channel Rossiya 1. The first screenshot of the patriotic novel The wall, from the pen of Minister Vladimir Medinski himself, was also funded by the Ministry of Culture.

In 2016, representatives of the Tsarist Cross public movement shared their thoughts on the film Matilda by director Aleksei Outchitel on Tsar Nicholas II's relationship with ballerina Mathilde Kschessinska. According to them, this is an anti-Russian and anti-religious provocation in the field of culture. Following a request from the Duma of the Russian Federation Natalia Poklonskaya addressed to the Prosecutor General, the film was examined, but no offense was found.

In January 2018, the Franco-British comedy, The Death of Stalin, was the subject of a cancellation of the distribution right by the Ministry of Culture because, in the words of the President of the Public Council near the Ministry of the Yuri Poliakov culture, the film showed traces of ideological struggle and alleged anti-Russian sentiment. The RBK Group, the experts, the artists, and the politicians have considered the withdrawal of the distribution rights of this film the day before its release in theaters as a purely ideological and political intervention on the part of the Minister of Culture. Minister Vladimir Medinsky, meanwhile, said that the people of the previous generation, but not only them, can consider this film as "an insulting mockery of Soviet society, of the USSR military and victims of Stalinism ".

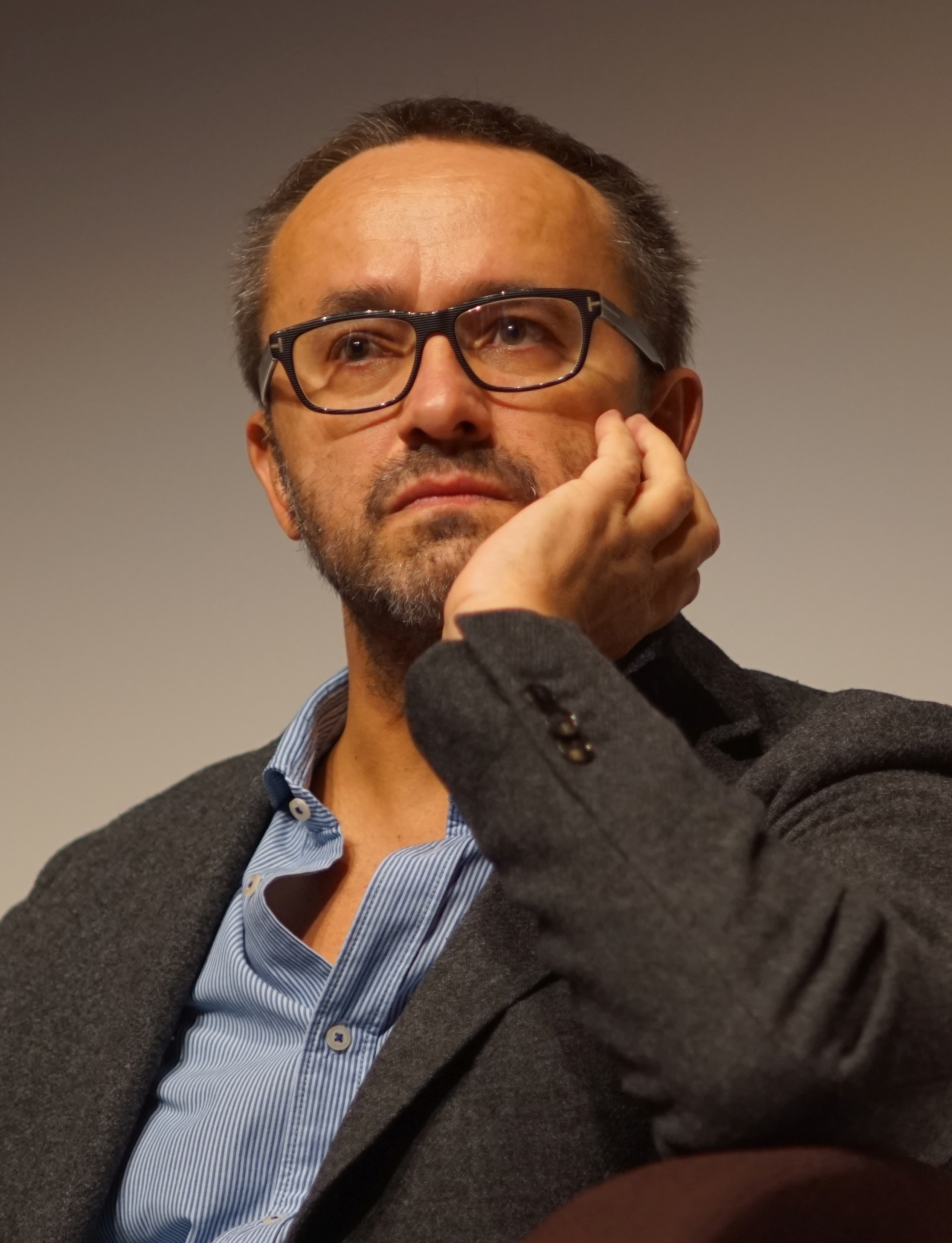
Andrey Zvyagintsev 2017

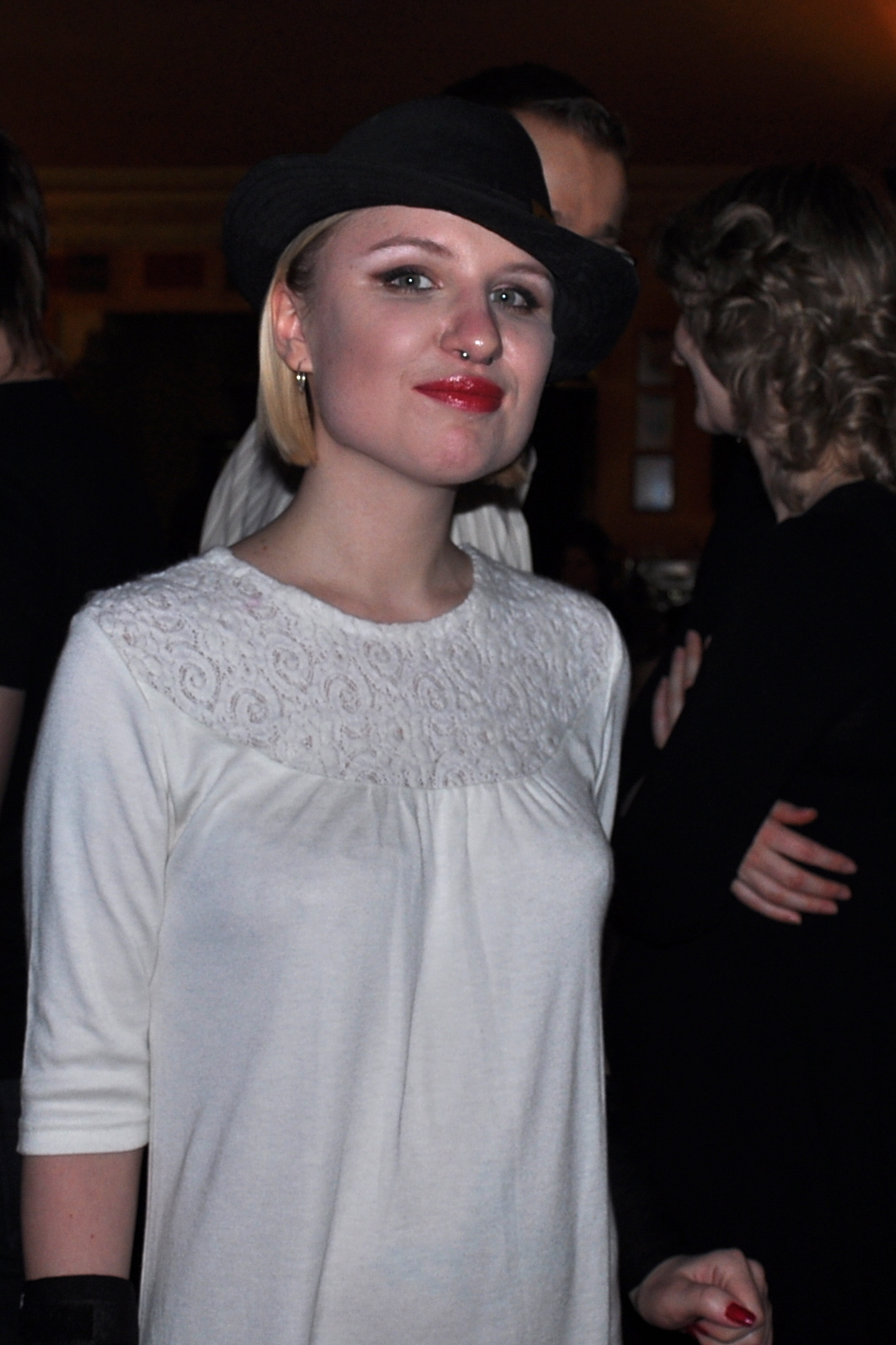
Valeriya Gai Germanika in 2009.

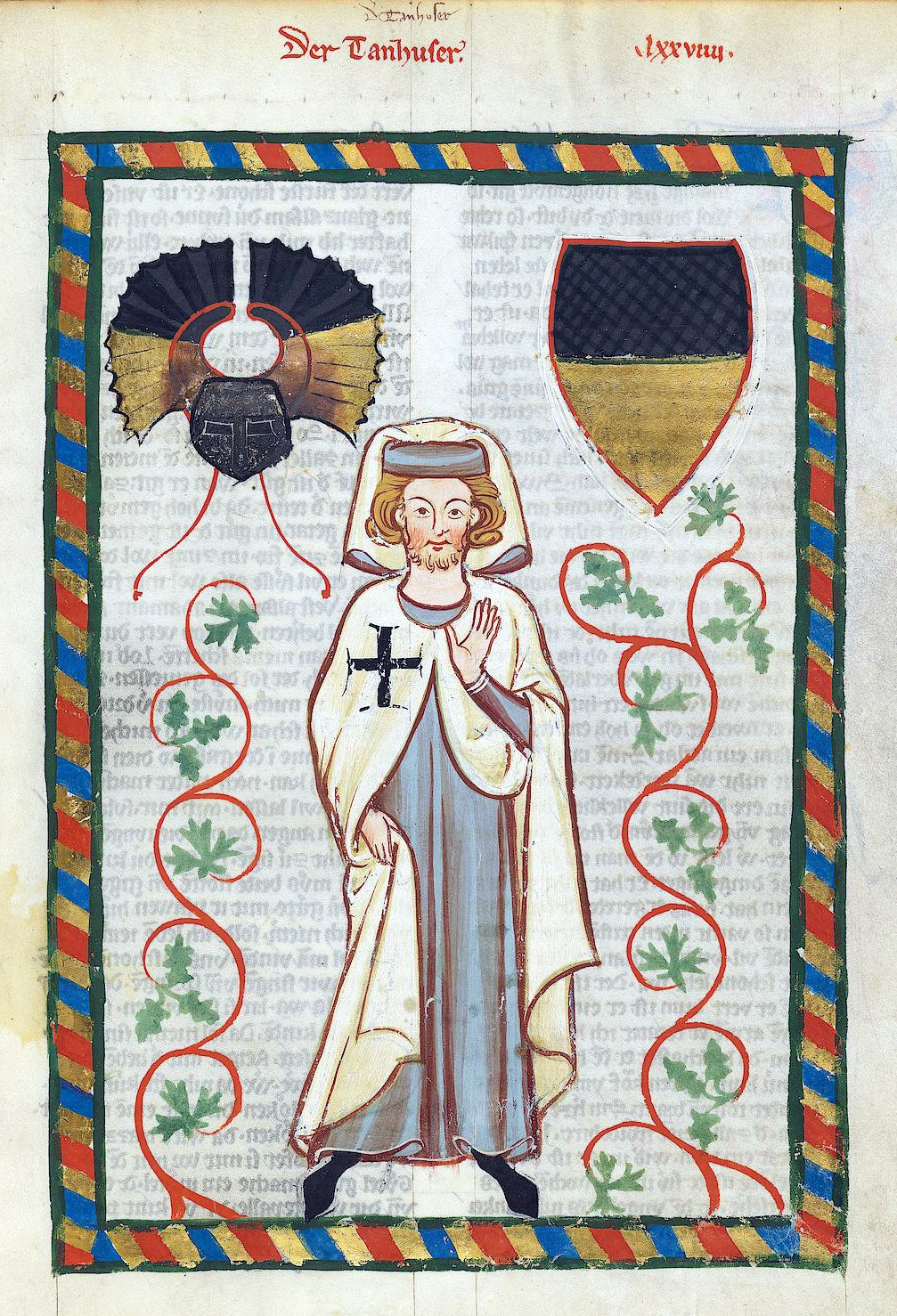
Tannhäuser, from the Codex Manesse, John Collier

== Censorship of theater and exhibitions ==
Since May 2012, in Russia, when Vladimir Medinski became Minister of Culture, the attacks of activists and Orthodox began to increase.

In October 2012, at the contemporary Erarta Museum in St. Petersburg, a solo scene of Lolita from Vladimir Nabokov's novel was interrupted. The artist Leonid Mozgovoy, who played the role, other actors and organizers were threatened with retaliation by the indignant Cossacks of St. Petersburg. They also sent angry letters to the media. The activists demanded the ban of this blasphemous spectacle which, in their opinion, "falls under the application of the legislation on propaganda on homosexuality and pedophilia".

In November 2013, orthodox activists interrupted the play An Ideal Husband at the Anton Chekhov Art Theater, demanding that this sacrilege be stopped. This scandal is the work of an activist at the Moscow Mission Center named Daniel, a certain Dmitri Tsorionov Enteo, who claims to find sodomy and blasphemy on the stage of this theater.

In July 2015, a priest from the Russian Orthodox Church, the rector of Saint Tikhon's Orthodox University, Dmitry Smirnov, and a group of Orthodox activists of more than 100 people organized a rally during the celebration. of the 20th anniversary of the radio station Rain Money in Moscow. After appearing on stage, they attacked the director, closed the equipment and interrupted the anniversary concert, claiming that the music disturbed prayer, although the nearest church was one kilometer away. In July 2016, in St. Petersburg, citizens demanded that the nakedness of the copy of Michelangelo's statue of David be hidden. In 2016, the most important events were:

- the removal of the repertoire of the Tannhäuser opera at the Novosibirsk Opera and Ballet Theatre;
- the interruption in Omsk of the performance of the rock show Jesus Christ Superstar;
- the interruption of Khorovod (La ronde) by director Piotr Chalchi after a play by the playwright Arthur Chlinder following the intervention of the Omsk eparchy
- the examination by the prosecutor of the show All shades of the blue at the Satiricon Theatre
- the closure in Moscow, at The Lumiere Brothers Center for Photography, of an exhibition by photographer Jock Sturges, with photographs of girls and girls in a naturist community. Photographs were sprinkled with urine and carvings broken.

Reacting to the censorship of the work Jesus Christ Superstar, because of the intolerance of part of the Orthodox public and his clergy to the interpretation of the image of the Savior, on 1 November 2016, the Russian Orthodox Church called to allow the display of this rock show Jesus Christ Superstar.

At the same time, since 2022, and even earlier, the official authorities in the visual arts have focused not on stylistic censorship, as was the case in the Soviet period, but exclusively on thematic censorship. At the same time, the state supports exhibitions of contemporary art from which any sensitive or critical themes have been removed, forcing it to function as a tool for the depoliticization of the public sphere.

== Censorship in literature ==
In November 2013, the media reported that when prosecutors checked the literature in the Stavropol libraries, they found books in school libraries that had nothing to do with the educational mission of the school. They were books on mysticism, eroticism and horror. The Senior Deputy Prosecutor of Stavropol Krai (Kurbangali Charipov), monitoring the enforcement of juvenile laws, discovered 215 violations of the law on the protection of children and on harmful information. He demanded the withdrawal of the works of Sergei Yesenin and Vladimir Nabokov. After this information was published in the media, the Prosecutor General of Russia denied that such an inspection took place, but he dismissed the prosecutor of Stavropol Sharipov.

On 13 June 2014, the teachers' edition, entitled 1 September, declared that it was no longer publishing for political reasons. "Civil liberties have been steadily decreasing, while the school is increasingly being run in inhuman conditions".

On 14 May 2025, Russian authorities arrested 10 employees of Russia's largest book publisher Eksmo for alleged "LGBT propaganda" in books.

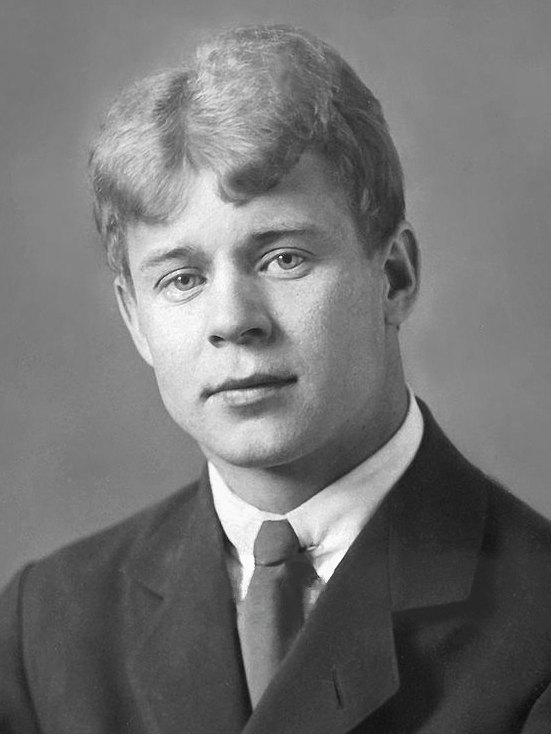
Sergei Yesenin in 1919

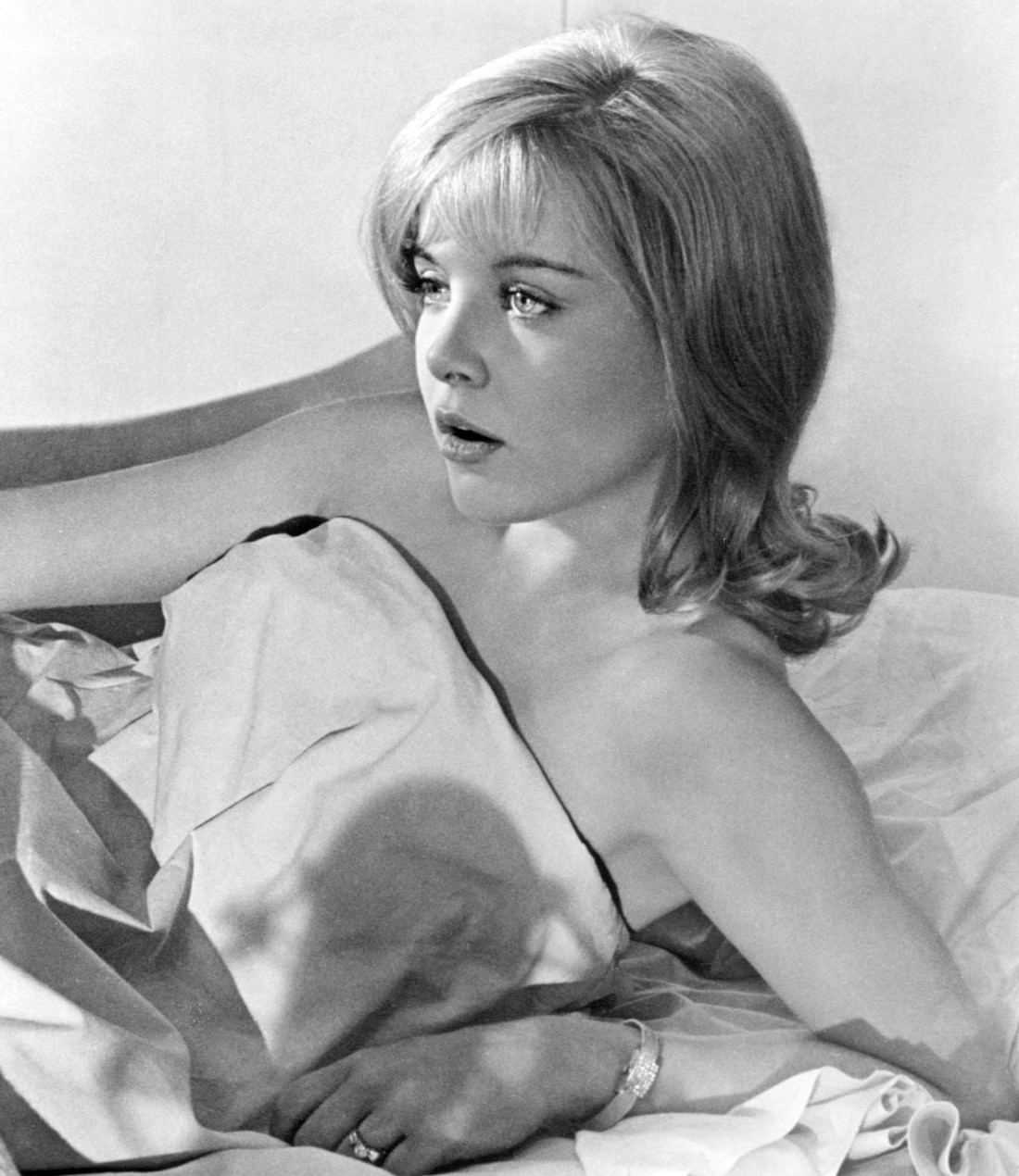
Sue Lyon; Sue Lyon in Tony Rome, 1967

== Internet censorship ==
Before 2009, the Internet remained relatively free in Russia but reached only 27% of the population. After 2009, the situation has changed rapidly, as in all regions of the world where the Internet is progressing.

State-controlled suppliers such as Rostelecom, "DOM.ru" and others openly block sites on excluded topics found in the Federal List of Extremist Materials (Federal List of Extremist Materials), by replacing the Domain Name System (DNS) records and redirecting them to a page that warns that "the materials and information you requested have been recognized as extremist by the competent court" and giving a reference to the list. Studies in 2020 and 2021 have shown that DNS over TLS/HTTPS could be used to bypass DNS censorship in the country.

In March 2009, in the Kemerovo Oblast, an activist from the Oborona youth movement named Dmitri Soloviov was sentenced on the basis of article 282 of the Criminal Code of the Russian Federation (Incitement to hatred and violation of human dignity) for the publication in August 2008 in "LiveJournal" of the headings such as "The FSB kills Russian children" that the law enforcement agency considers inciting hatred vis-à-vis officials of the Ministry of the Interior and the Federal Security Service of the Russian Federation".

On the night of 6 to 7 March 2009, under strange circumstances in the 30th Division of the St. Petersburg Militia, a 29-year-old man, named Vadim Tcharushev, an internet blogger, claiming: "I did not vote for United Russia and the Putin puppet" and "I am against the KGB dictatorship in Russia!" was forcibly hospitalized at the No. 6 psychiatric hospital. According to this person, he was threatened and intimidated at the clinic and forced to sign a declaration of voluntary treatment. In LiveJournal, some thought it was a return to the methods of punitive psychiatry.

In May 2009, the American company Cryptohippie, which deals with development in the field of computer security, published a report on the subject of the police state in electronics, in which is disclosed the list of the most advanced countries. Internet censorship. This assessment is based on 17 criteria of freedom in a network, including the control of citizens' financial transactions forcing internet service providers to collect and store data from its users. Russia ranks fourth, behind Belarus, China and North Korea.

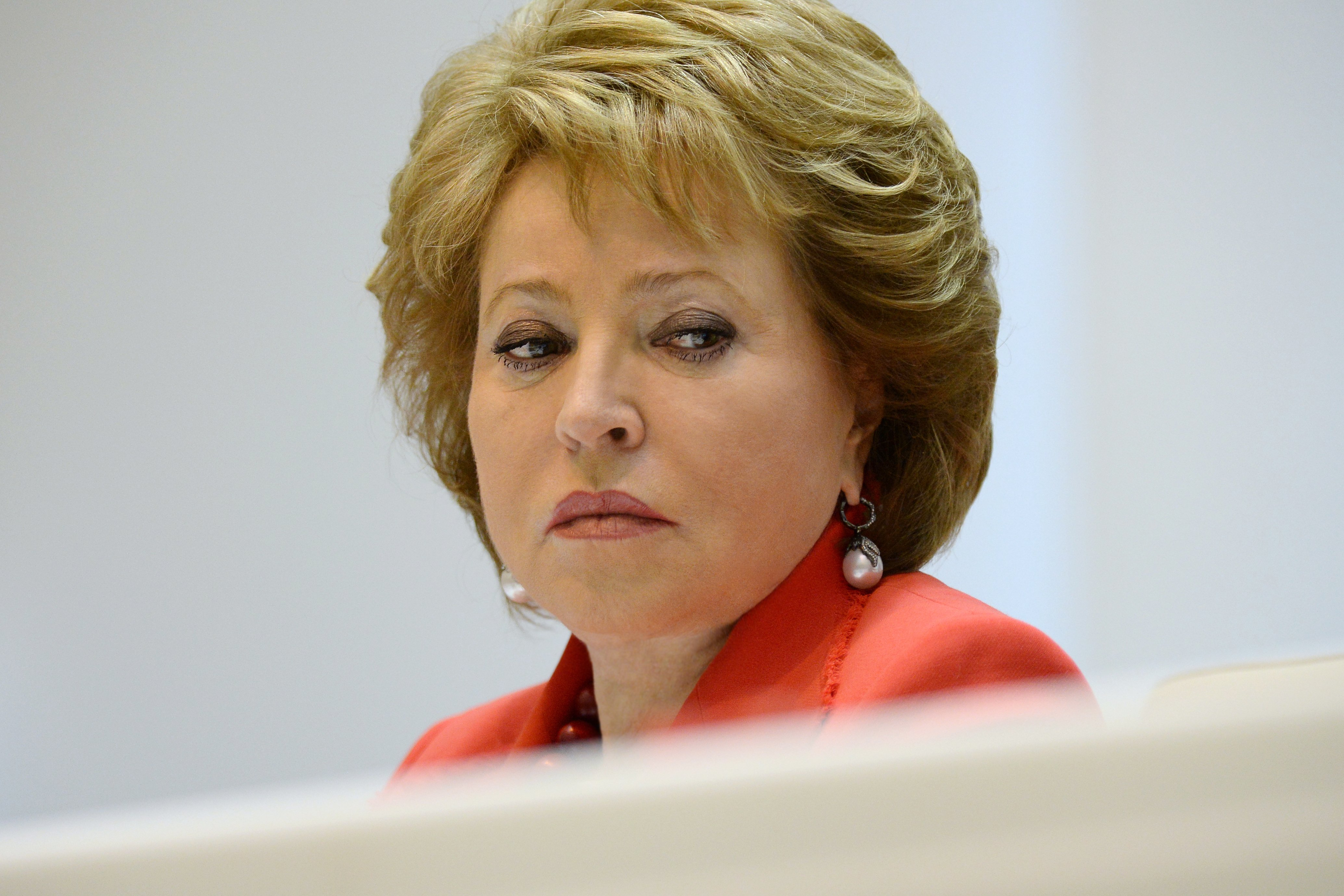
Valentina Matviyenko

On 7 July 2009, without any court order, on the orders of the Ministry of the Interior, a supplier was blocked from accessing the project site Khronos. According to the official version the site was blocked because of its presentation of Adolf Hitler's forbidden digital book, Mein Kampf. However Khronos founder, Vyacheslav Rumyantsev, is convinced that the real reason is not the widespread distribution of the book on the Internet, but the criticism of the governor of Valentina Matvienko, following her decision to reduce subsidies to Leningrad's historic site that did not like at all on the site.

At the end of July 2009, the Federal Security Service of the Russian Federation acted as one of the initiators of the ban in Russia of the Skype VoIP service due to the fact that this service could not be monitored by the FSB thanks to the SORM system which allows the FSB to listen to telephone calls. Subsequently, the Service de intelligence has announced that it has found a technological solution to listen to Skype.

On 4 August 2009, in Ufa, several bloggers who criticized the power in Bashkortostan were arrested. They are accused of having, on 27 September 2008, placed on their site "Уфа губернская" [archive] extracts from the book of Aırat Dilmoukhametov The wars against aborted. Despite the fact that the investigation did not find traces of extremism in the published documents, the city's research services insisted that the bloggers be kept in detention for opposition (political).

In September 2009, the Ministry of Justice of the Russian Federation proposed to strengthen the sanctions to unauthorized state sites and to change the Domain Name System Domain in the .ru zone. Under the new rules, confirmation of passport data to the registrar of the domain name is required, and providers will be required to provide the law enforcement agency with information about the users and services that are available to them. rendered. In addition, and for the first time in Russian practice, the authorities obtain the right to require the access provider to suspend the provision of its services to particular users, the non-compliance with which is sanctioned by heavy fines.

On 4 December 2009, a medical student at Ivan Peregorodiev State University was arrested in Saratov on a charge of knowingly establishing a false report which is described as an act of terrorism (Article 207 Federation Criminal Code). from Russia. The reasons for initiating criminal proceedings in this case are based on a file introduced in LiveJournal, which reads as follows: "Saratov autopsies findings concluding that swine flu died are similar to the description in the medical literature of the results of autopsies of patients with pulmonary plague (also called pneumonic) (the latter much more dangerous for the man). This file caused panic in the population. Today in Saratov, it is planned to spray reagents against pneumonic plague from helicopters and attack directly bacilli. This is the first case of a blogger who leaked fake news on a website. Garry Kasparov.

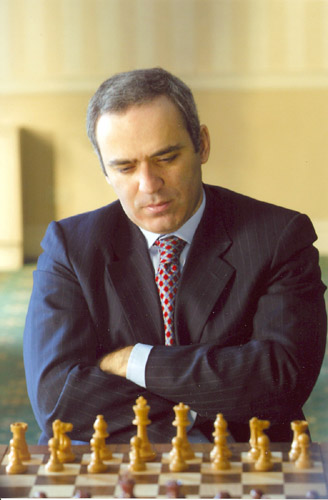
Garry Kasparov

On 6 December 2009, the WiMAX and Yota (Skartel) provider temporarily blocked a number of sites for Moscow users who had, to some extent, spoken of the Opposition. Among them are the Garry Kasparov sites, the National Bolshevik Party movements, Solidarnost and the Unified Civic Front, and the New Times News Website and the Kavkaz Center portal. For all others the site of the President of the Russian Federation was inaccessible. The access providers explained the impossibility to access the sites for technical reasons.

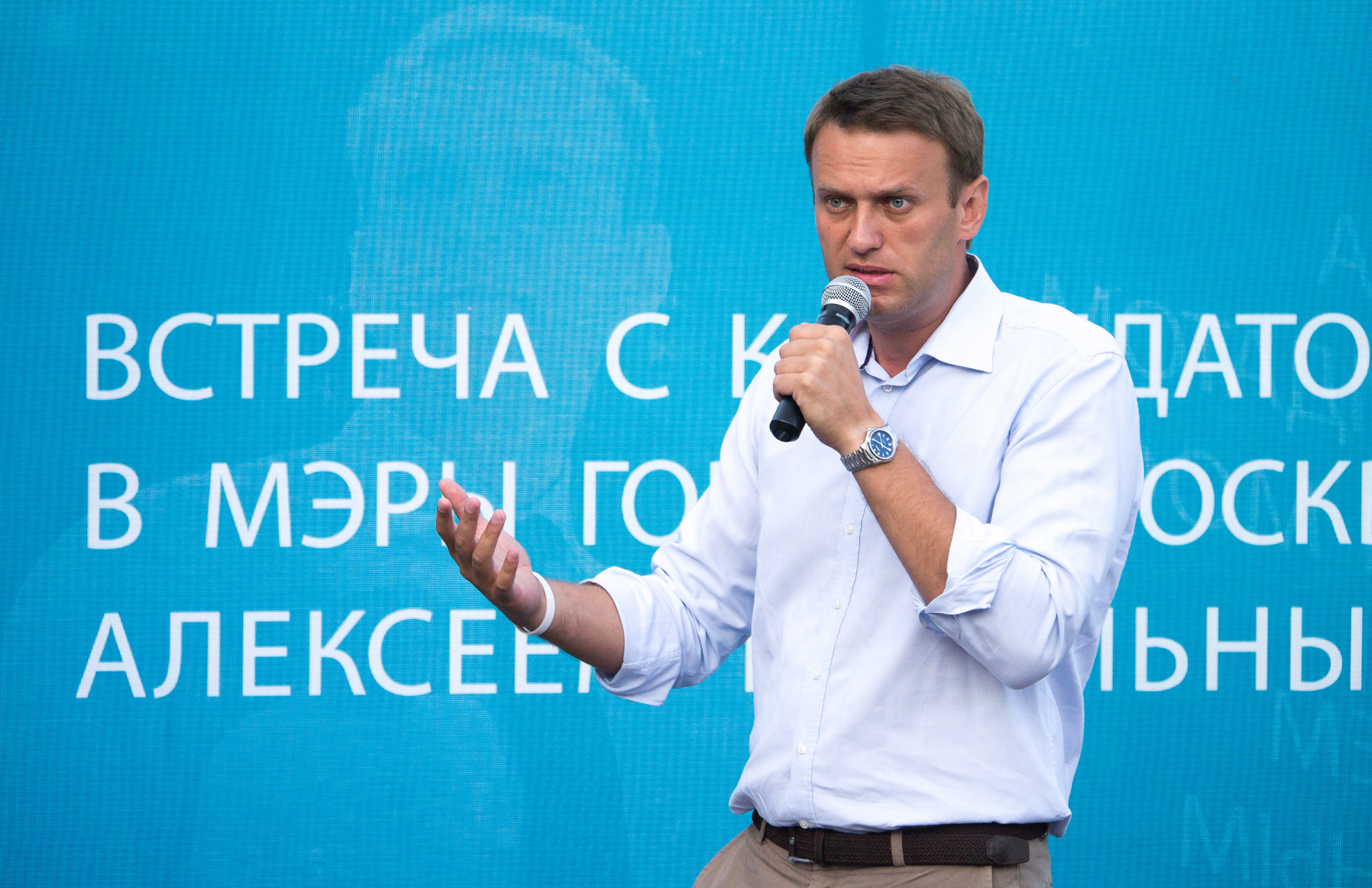
Alexei Navalny

On 27 July 2012, journalist and blogger Oleg Kozyrev, and a series of other bloggers report that Beeline blocked the site of Alexei Navalny The best truth machine. The website of the operator indicates this: "This site is blocked by decision of the organs of the power of the State".

On 28 July 2012, Federal Law No. 139-FZ of 28 July 2012 was adopted. Since 1 November the register of forbidden sites on the Russian segment of Internet works.

According to BFM.ru90 the Russian government proposes to introduce the prior censorship of the Internet in Russia

According to Minister Denis Moltchanov, access providers must verify the legality of the content introduced by users and in case of violation found to the laws must report it to which of right. The underlying idea is to create a registry with a directory numbered specifically for each content title. In the absence of compliance with this numbering, the distributor is threatened with verification Vedomosti, 19 November 2012.

On 4 November 2016, State Duma deputy speaker and journalist Pyotr Olegovich Tolstoy proposed to severely punish those who deride patriotic values on the Web. The anger of the former TV host was provoked by the mat vocabulary used on the blogosphere, but also by messages on social networks that "spit out tons of bile to make fun of the traditional values of the Russian people: the orthodox faith, family, spirituality ".

In July 2017, the Duma after second reading adopted the bill on the prohibition of Anonymizing Proxy, Tor and Virtual Private Network. The law enforcement is entrusted to the FSB and the agents of the Ministry of the Interior. The project also includes search engines that the Duma wants to see in place to prevent blocking user sites.

Roskomnadzor threatened to block access to the Russian Wikipedia in Russia over the article "Вторжение России на Украину (2022)" ("Russia's invasion of Ukraine (2022)"), claiming that the article contains "illegally distributed information", including "reports about numerous casualties among service personnel of the Russian Federation and also the civilian population of Ukraine, including children".

On 11 March 2022, Belarusian political police GUBOPiK arrested and detained editor of Russian Wikipedia from Minsk Mark Bernstein, who was editing the Wikipedia article about the Russian invasion of Ukraine, accusing him of the "spread of anti-Russian materials" and of violating Russian "fake news" law.

As of 8 August 2022, Russian authorities have blocked or removed about 138,000 websites since Russia began its invasion of Ukraine in February 2022.

== The index of Freedom House and Reporters Without Borders ==
In 2013 according to Reporters Without Borders, Russia occupies the 148th place on 179 in terms of censorship. In 2017 it is in the same place

According to its index of freedom on the Internet in 2013, the organization Freedom House ranks Russia on the index. Countries where the Internet is free are ranked from 0 to 30; those where freedom is partial are classified from index 30 to index 60; those without freedom are classified between the index 60 and the index 100.

== See also ==
- Blocking of Meta Platforms in Russia
- Freedom of assembly in Russia
- List of LGBT books banned in Russia
- Media freedom in Russia
- Reporters Without Borders
- World Press Freedom Index
- Russian 2022 war censorship laws
- Russian fake news laws
