= U.S.–Soviet Space Bridge =

Series of international public television links

The US-Soviet Space Bridge was a series of experimental, international telecasts between Soviet and U.S. viewers, performed by group of communication enthusiasts during the late Cold War era. The Russian term is telemost (literally, "TV bridge"). A space bridge was a public television link between two or more distinct locations, a form of public videoconference.

The first space bridge was an arrangement between the Unuson Corporation and Gosteleradio of the USSR for the US Festival, sponsored by computer pioneer Steve Wozniak. On September 5, 1982, a TV-link was established for the first time between the Soviet Union and the United States. On the Soviet side, Iosif Goldin (Иосиф Гольдин) and Yuli Gusman were in charge. On the United States side was the Documentary Guild and producer Mark Warner and associate producer Lester Gray of King Broadcasting.

The participants in that space bridge could see each other, ask questions and receive answers, and also hold a musical dialogue. The programs of the subsequent space bridges consisted not only of music-hall turns and greetings but also discussions on different subjects, in which prominent scientists, public figures, cosmonauts and journalists took part. Phil Donahue and Vladimir Pozner hosted the meeting between the US and the USSR, respectively. According to Pozner's book, Parting With Illusions, many U.S. TV companies did not want to purchase those space bridges. Thus only eight million people in the U.S. watched the programs, versus 180 million in the USSR.

== There is no sex in the USSR ==
When an American asked a question about TV advertisements exploiting sex in the Soviet Union, a Soviet lady (Russian: Людмила Иванова, Liudmila Ivanova) answered "Well, sex... (laugh) we don't have it, and we are absolutely against it!", which was then corrected by another Soviet lady present in the show: "We do have sex, but we do not have advertisements!". This created the catchphrase "There is no sex in the USSR!".

Liudmila Ivanova has told a different story to the Komsomolskaya Pravda newspaper:

Well, the TV show started, and one American lady have said: you must stop having sex with your men because of the Afghan War – then they won't go to the war. And kept pointing at me. Then I answered her: there is no sex in the USSR, but there is love. And you also didn't stop having sex with your men during the Vietnam War. But everyone remembered only the beginning of the phrase. Am I not right? We have always considered the word "sex" almost dirty. We were always making love, not sex. That is what I meant.
