= Brian Kahn =

Brian Kahn (1947–2020) was an American attorney, author, journalist, and public radio host. He founded the weekly public affairs program Home Ground which is broadcast on 30+ stations/translators in the Rocky Mountain west. On the air since 1996, it was named Montana's Outstanding Non-Commercial Radio Program in 2002. Kahn won the 2009 Montana Governor's Award for the Humanities.

Kahn was born in New York and moved to California as a child. He was an amateur boxer while in school and while he attended law school at the University of California, Berkeley he also coached boxing. the youngest person elected to the Sonoma County Board of Supervisors and sat on the California Fish and Game Commission. He moved to Montana in the late 1980s and was the director of the Montana Nature Conservancy.

His book Real Common Sense, "a well-written, well-intentioned reflection on what it means to be a citizen in today's imperfect America," was published in 2011 by Seven Stories Press. Rediscovering My Country was published in 2015 and presented at the Havana International Book Fair.

== Awards ==
- Montana Governor's Award for the Humanities
- CINE Golden Eagle Award for "A Thousand Cranes", documentary film about US–Soviet cooperation to save the Siberian crane from extinction.
- President's Medal, Salerno International Film Festival, "A Thousand Cranes".
- Chevron Conservation Award

== Publications ==
- The Streamside Flyfisher's Guide, with Max Hale (Baetis Press, 1981).
- Seasons of the Hunter, Robert Elman, editor. Contributing author. (A. Knopf, N.Y. 1985).
- Parting With Illusions, by Vladimir Pozner (Atlantic Monthly Press, N.Y. 1990) collaborator.
- Training People, by Tess of Helena (Chronicle Books, San Francisco, 2007)
- America, One Story High, with Vladimir Pozner, (Zebra E, Moscow, 2008)
- Real Common Sense (Seven Stories Press, N.Y. 2011)
- Huffington Post blog, 2012–present
- Rediscovering My Country (Social Sciences Editorial, Havana, Cuba, 2015)

== Television ==
- A Thousand Cranes, aired internationally on TBS, BBC, national Soviet television, 1987. Producer, Executive Producer.
- America, One Storey High, 16-hour documentary series on the United States, broadcast on Russia's Channel One. Winner of the NIKA Award. Kahn served with Vladimir Pozner and Ivan Urgant as co-host.
