= LGBTQ book censorship in Russia =

The sale of certain books said to contain LGBT-related themes are restricted in Russian bookstores due to the Russian gay propaganda law. The formal name of the list is "Register of goods containing banned information (LGBT+)".

Among the more than 250 titles are works by Plato, Boccaccio, Virginia Woolf, Fyodor Dostoevsky, Stephen King, Haruki Murakami, Marcel Proust, Oscar Wilde, and Stefan Zweig. The publication of the list caused a wide public outcry.

Manifestations of LGBT book censorship have happened before, but the existence of the list became known on February 20, 2024, although it was compiled as early as December 2022. Representatives of the authorities, including deputy Alexander Khinshtein, tried to disavow the list, despite the fact that various representatives of the book market confirmed its existence. Another MP, Aleksandr Sholokhov, expressed support for the list.

== See also ==
- LGBT rights in Russia
- Censorship in Russia
- Literary inquisition
