= Parting with Illusions =

1990 book by Vladimir Vladimirovič Pozner

- Author: Vladimir Posner
- Language: English
- Genre: Autobiography
- Publisher: Atlantic Monthly Press
- Publication date: 1990
- Publication place: United States

Parting With Illusions is an autobiographical book by television journalist Vladimir Posner.

== About ==
It was originally written in English and published in the US by Atlantic Monthly Press in 1990, with the subtitle, the extraordinary life and controversial views of the Soviet Union's leading commentator. Thanks to Posner's fame in America as a Soviet television host during the Cold War, the book received considerable attention (including 12 weeks on the New York Times bestseller list). The Los Angeles Times, however, referred to the book as "unabashed self-promotion."

Pozner spent many years thinking about how to present the book to readers in his home country, and completed a Russian translation (with some updated comments) in 2008, but it wasn't released until 2012, when it was published in Moscow by Astrel. The book used photos from Pozner's personal archive. The design of the Russian edition was sharply criticised by Penguin Books art director Paul Buckley, who said, "everything here is boring. The photo is boring, the font is boring, the layout is boring, and who would be interested in a book like this in the US? It would have died a slow death."
