= Vladimir Pozner Sr. =

Russian-Jewish émigré to the US (1908–1975)

- Born: 24 October 1908; Saint Petersburg, Russian Empire
- Died: 31 July 1975 (aged 66); Moscow, Soviet Union
- Education: University of Paris
- Occupations: Audio engineer, spy
- Children: 2, including Vladimir
- Relatives: Vladimir Pozner (writer) (cousin); Victoria Mercanton (younger sister)

Vladimir Aleksandrovich Pozner (Russian: Владимир Александрович Познер; 24 October 1908 – 31 July 1975) was a Russian-Jewish émigré to the United States. During World War II, he spied for Soviet intelligence while he was employed by the US government.

Pozner was born in St. Petersburg. His family fled Soviet Russia after the Bolshevik Revolution, and Vladimir Pozner became a Communist sympathizer while living in Europe. Vladimir Pozner and his family moved to East Berlin and later to Moscow in the early 1950s. There he worked as a senior audio engineer for the Soviet film industry.

His sister, Victoria Mercanton, was an in-demand film editor based in France. He retired in 1968, and in 1969 suffered a heart attack. Pozner died on 31 July 1975 during a flight from Paris to Moscow.

Vladimir Pozner's cover name as identified in the Venona project by NSA/FBI analysts was "Platon" or Plato in Russian. Pozner's son, Vladimir Pozner Jr., born in 1934, worked as a journalist and interpreter in the United States, Soviet Union and later in Russia.
