= Vladimir Pozner Jr. =

French-born Russian-American journalist (born 1934)

Vladimir Pozner
- Владимир Познер
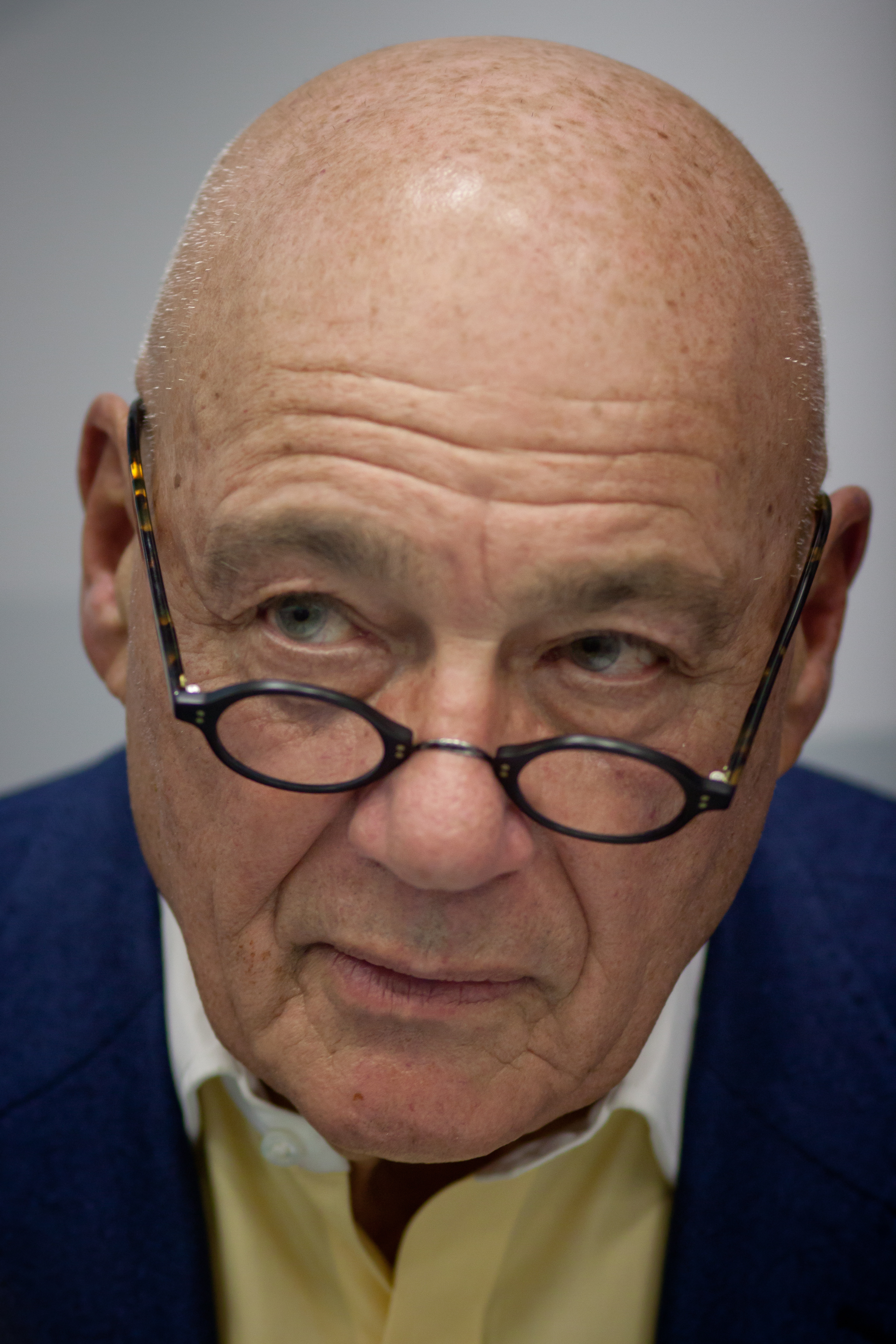
- Pozner in 2013
- Born: Vladimir Vladimirovich Pozner; April 1, 1934 (age 92); Paris, France
- Citizenship: United States; France; Russia
- Education: Moscow State University (BS, 1958)
- Occupation: Journalist
- Years active: 1961–present
- Spouses: Valentina Chemberdzhi (m. 1957; div. 1967); Yekaterina Orlova (m. 1969; div. 2005); Nadezhda Solovieva (m. 2005)
- Vladimir Pozner's voice (in Russian) recorded December 2013
- Website: pozneronline.ru

Vladimir Vladimirovich Pozner (Russian: Владимир Владимирович Познер), sometimes Vladimir Pozner, Jr. (born 1 April 1934), is a French-born Russian-American journalist and presenter. In the West he represented and explained the views of the Soviet Union during the Cold War. He was a spokesman for the Soviets, in part because he grew up in the United States and speaks fluent English, Russian, and French. Pozner later described his role as propaganda.

After the Cold War, Pozner moved to the United States to work with Phil Donahue, before returning to Moscow to continue working as a television journalist. From 2008 until 2022, he hosted the eponymous show Pozner on Russia's Channel One where he interviewed public figures.

== Early life and education ==
Vladimir Pozner was born in Paris on 1 April 1934, to a Russian Jewish father, Vladimir Aleksandrovich Pozner, and a French Catholic mother, Géraldine Lutten. The couple separated shortly after his birth. When Vladimir was 3 months old, he and his mother moved to New York City, where Géraldine's mother and younger sister lived. In the spring of 1939 Pozner's parents reunited and the family returned to Paris, France.

After the outbreak of World War II and the invasion of France the Pozners fled Paris in the fall of 1940, traveling via Marseille in the Free Zone, Madrid, Barcelona, and Lisbon, before sailing back to the US. The escape was partially financed by a Jewish family whose adult daughter traveled with the Pozners disguised as Vladimir's nanny.

Back in New York, Vladimir attended Caroline Pratt's City and Country School and later Stuyvesant High School in Manhattan. Robert Hollander, an elementary school friend of Pozner, remembered him most vividly for "his capacities for, one, having extraordinarily attractive fantasies and, two, for getting the rest of us to believe them."

In 1946, with the advent of what later came to be called McCarthyism, Pozner senior began to have serious problems with the Federal Bureau of Investigation, because of his pro-Soviet views and alleged cooperation with the Soviet intelligence services. The documents that conclusively proved the secret service connections of his father were published in 1996 in the United States, as part of the Venona project files.

As a result, the Pozners intended to return to France, but Pozner senior was refused a French visa after being denounced to the French Foreign Ministry as a "subversive element" and a spy. The family moved in 1948 to the Soviet sector of Berlin, where Pozner senior was offered a position with SovExportFilm, an international distributor of Soviet films. At one time Pozner junior claimed to have stayed behind in New York, attending Columbia College between 1950 and December 1953; however, there appears to be no record of him at Columbia. Currently he tells of attending a Russian military-style high school in Berlin run by the Soviet Military Administration during that time.

In 1952, the Pozner family moved to Moscow. In 1953 the younger Pozner enrolled at Moscow State University, Faculty of Biology and Soil Science, majoring in human physiology. He graduated in 1958.

== Career ==
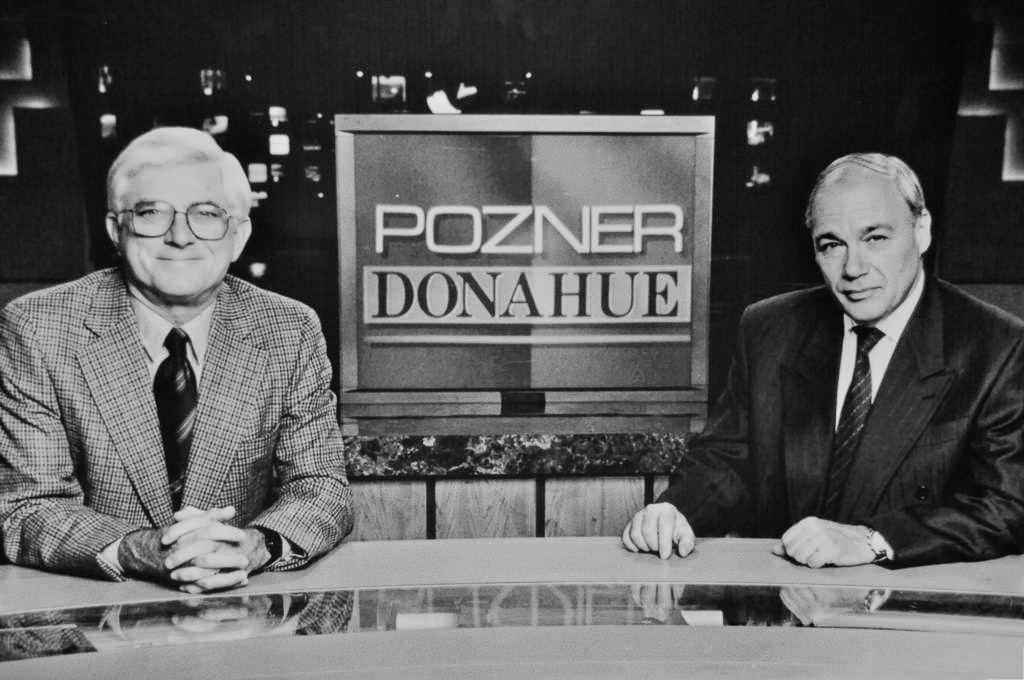
Phil Donahue and Pozner in c. 1997

Pozner began his career as a "journalist" – unwittingly, by his own account – in a disinformation department of the KGB. In 1961 he was offered the position of senior editor with the English-language Soviet Life magazine. In 1967 he transferred to a sister publication, Sputnik, leaving it in February 1970 to take up a post with the State Television and Radio Committee, where he became a chief commentator and host of the propaganda radio program the Voice of Moscow on the North American service of Radio Moscow.

Beginning in the early 1970s, and until the early 1990s, Pozner was a regular guest on Ray Briem's talk show on KABC in Los Angeles. During the 1980s, he was a favourite guest on Ted Koppel's Nightline. Pozner was the host of Moscow Meridian, an English-language current affairs program focusing on the Soviet Union; the show was produced by Gosteleradio, the Soviet State Committee for Television and Radio and broadcast on the Satellite Program Network. He also often appeared on The Phil Donahue Show.

In his Western media appearances Pozner was a charismatic and articulate apologist for some of the Soviet Union's most controversial foreign and domestic policy decisions. He would frequently draw parallels and point out similarities between Soviet and Western policies as well as candidly admitting the existence of certain problems in the USSR. However, while stopping short of unequivocal endorsement and support, he nevertheless rationalized, among other events, the arrest and exiling of Andrei Sakharov, the invasion of Afghanistan, and the shooting down of Korean Air Lines Flight 007, in his 1990 autobiography Parting with Illusions. Later, he wrote that some of the positions he had taken were wrong and immoral. In a 2005 interview with NPR's On the Media, Pozner spoke openly about his role as a Soviet spokesman, stating bluntly, "What I was doing was propaganda." Comparing his former role to that of Karen Hughes, the U.S. Under Secretary of State for Public Diplomacy and Public Affairs under George W. Bush, he commented that, "You know, as someone who's gone through this and someone who regrets having done what he's done, and who spent many, many years of his life, and I think probably the best years of my life, doing something that was wrong, I say it just isn't worth it".

Despite his frequent appearances in the North American media and his near-celebrity status there as the principal spokesman for the Soviet Union, Pozner remained virtually unknown at home. This changed in the mid-1980s, when Pozner co-hosted several bilateral, televised discussions (or "spacebridges") between audiences in the Soviet Union and the US, carried via satellite. These were initially produced with Helene Keyssar at the University of California, San Diego. They included "Moscow Calling San Diego: Children and Film" (with Mike Cole), "Remembering War" (May 7, 1985, with Fred Starr). Later programs included "Citizens Summit I - Leningrad/Seattle" (December 29, 1985) and "Citizens Summit II: Women to Women - Leningrad/Boston" (May 20, 1986) - both with Phil Donahue. The programs marked a dramatic turning point in Pozner's career, garnering him instant renown and wide popularity and acclaim from domestic audiences in the USSR. Pozner also introduced Russian rock band Autograph for Live Aid. He was promoted to the position of "political observer of Central Television", the highest journalistic rank at Gosteleradio, and started to work on programs that were broadcast domestically. However, in 1991 Pozner was asked to resign after being quoted voicing his support for Boris Yeltsin over Mikhail Gorbachev.

Later that year, Pozner received an offer to work with Phil Donahue and moved to the United States. From 1991 to 1994 they co-hosted Pozner/Donahue, a weekly, issues-oriented roundtable program, which was aired both on CNBC and in syndication. While living in New York, Pozner regularly commuted to Moscow to tape his programs that aired in Russia.

Pozner returned to Moscow in 1997, continuing his work as an independent television journalist. Later that year, he founded the School for Television Excellence («Школа телевизионного мастерства») in Moscow to educate and promote young journalists.

From its foundation in 1994 until 2008 Pozner was president of the Russian Television Academy, which annually awards the prestigious TEFI trophy. Pozner also worked for the Institute for US and Canadian Studies, a Soviet think tank.

Since 2004, Pozner and his brother Pavel have owned a French brasserie in Moscow, Жеральдин (Chez Géraldine), named after their mother.

== Shows ==
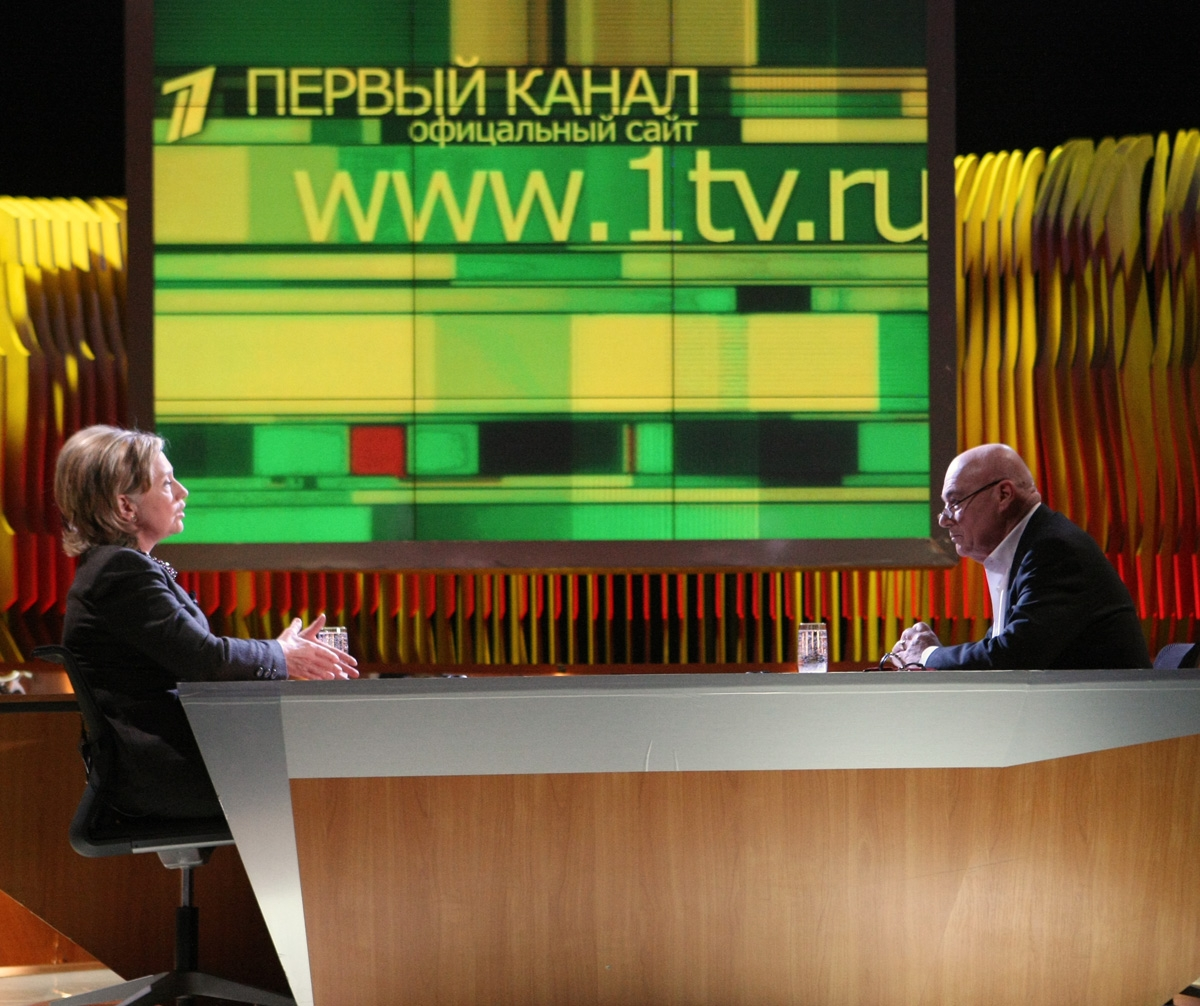
Vladimir Pozner interviews U.S. Secretary of State Hillary Rodham Clinton on the "Pozner Show" in Moscow, March 19, 2010

For many years during the Cold War, Pozner delivered the nightly "Radio Moscow News and Commentary" program on the North America Service with his signature greeting, "Thank you and good evening". Pozner was the host of several shows on Russian TV, among them the US-Soviet space bridges, Mi (translated Us), Vremya i Mi (The Time and Us), Voskresnyi Vecher s Vladimirom Poznerom (Sunday Night with Vladimir Pozner), Chelovek v maske (A Man in the Mask), Vremena (Times). Most of these followed a talk show format, with varying numbers of guests and varying degree and manner of audience participation.

Since 2004 Pozner has been contributing his time as the host of Vremya Zhit' ! (A time to live!), a series of talk shows about the problem of HIV/AIDS. The programs are produced and broadcast by regional television stations and focus on addressing the local challenges that exist in different parts of Russia.

In the documentary film Lugovoy, pervy podozrevaemy (Lugovoy, the first suspected) about Andrey Lugovoy, suspected of being the killer of Aleksandr Litvinenko, Pozner makes important statements, such as his claim that KGB agents were taken for heroes in the Soviet Union, like James Bond in the UK.

In 2008 Pozner, together with Ivan Urgant and Brian Kahn, released Odnoetazhnaya Amerika ("One-Storied America"), a 16-episode travel documentary based on the 1937 book Little Golden America by Ilya Ilf and Yevgenyi Petrov. Pozner and Urgant also collaborated on a number of subsequent projects: Tour de France, Their Italy, German Conundrum, England Generally and Particularly, and Jewish Happiness, broadcast in 2010, 2012, 2013, 2015, and 2016 respectively.

In 2008 Pozner launched the eponymous show Pozner on Russia's Channel One, in which he interviews public figures – politicians, artists, scientists, musicians, actors, directors, sportsmen, doctors, magnates, and so on – at the rate of one interview per episode. Pozner has a lively and unconstrained style of hosting and he often fires cutting off-the-cuff remarks at his guests. He frequently comments, too, on how the political or economic decision at issue in any of his shows could affect the common people of Russia.

After the 2022 Russian invasion of Ukraine, the show stopped airing. The last broadcast was on 21 February 2022, and Pozner declined to explain why the show stopped appearing on television. However, in March 2022, he revealed in his website that Channel One had suspended the program to make room for covering the "special military operation".

== Personal life ==
In his final year at Moscow University (1958) Pozner married Valentina Chemberdzhi, a fellow student in the Department of Philology. Two years later they had a daughter, Yekaterina. Since 1990 Yekaterina has lived in Berlin, where she is a professional pianist and composer, working as Katia Tchemberdji. Pozner and his first wife divorced in 1968.

Around the time of his divorce, Pozner met Yekaterina Orlova, who would become his second wife, while they were both working for the Novosti Press Agency's Sputnik magazine. They remained married for 35 years. Orlova, an experienced journalist in her own right, was a co-founder of the Pozner School for Television Excellence. Since 2005 Pozner has been linked with Nadezhda Solovyova, а leading Russian show business impresario.

Pozner holds three citizenships: French - by birth, Russian (initially, Soviet) - presumably by descent and US - obtained in the early 1990s by naturalization. In 1968, while attempting to renounce his French nationality so that he could visit France without fear of prosecution for failure to serve in the Algerian War, he was formally notified by the Soviet Foreign Ministry that his Soviet passport, initially granted to him in 1950, at 16, had been issued in error, and that he was not in fact a citizen of the USSR. Much to Pozner's amusement this also technically invalidated, among other things, his membership in the CPSU, his marriage and divorce, his residency permit (propiska), and his rank of lieutenant in the reserves.

Pozner is a fan of tennis and baseball. In 1992, he co-founded The Moscow Dummies (Московские Чайники, lit. the Moscow Teapots, see "chainik" for the term), an amateur baseball team. He is a cigar aficionado. He also collects turtle figurines and fountain pens. He enjoys playing charades.

== Views ==
Pozner is an atheist.

He advocates the right to euthanasia, advocates the legalization of same-sex marriage, and supports the idea of combating drug trafficking and crime among drug addicts by legalizing the sale of drugs.

He credits the expansion of NATO since the dissolution of the Soviet Union, the post-cold war strategy, and the subsequent lack of attention to specific Russian diplomatic overtures for the creation of Vladimir Putin.

== Controversies ==
In April 2021, Pozner was forced to cut his birthday celebration short and flee Georgia after his hotel was blockaded by protesters calling him a "Kremlin propagandist". Protesters pelted Pozner's entourage with eggs and were angry with his past statements, where in 2010, Pozner blamed Georgia for the situation that led to the Russo-Georgian War and said: "Georgia lost [Abkhazia] forever" and that it "will never be Georgia's territory again." The visit was permitted by the Georgian government, and Prime Minister Irakli Garibashvili defended his government's decision to permit the visit, saying that Pozner had a negative test for COVID-19 on entry which was valid and that he did not appear to break any local laws aimed at opposing the Russian military occupation of the breakaway regions. Garibashvili blamed the National Movement and its supporters for the incident, calling the protests "actions that violated civilized norms and Georgian standards".

== Books ==
- Pozner, Vladimir; Helene G. Keyssar (1990). Remembering War: A U.S.-Soviet Dialogue. Oxford University Press. ISBN 978-0-19-505126-1.
- Pozner, Vladimir (March 1991). Parting With Illusions: The Extraordinary Life and Controversial Views of the Soviet Union's Leading Commentator. HarperCollins. ISBN 978-0-380-71349-3.
- Pozner, Vladimir (February 1992). Eyewitness: A Personal Account of the Unraveling of the Soviet Union. Atlantic Monthly Press. ISBN 978-0-679-41202-1.
- Pozner, Vladimir; Brian Kahn; Ivan Urgant (2008). Odnoėtazhnaia Amerika (in Russian). Zebra E. ISBN 978-5-94663-604-9.
