= Epiphany (holiday) =

Christian feast day

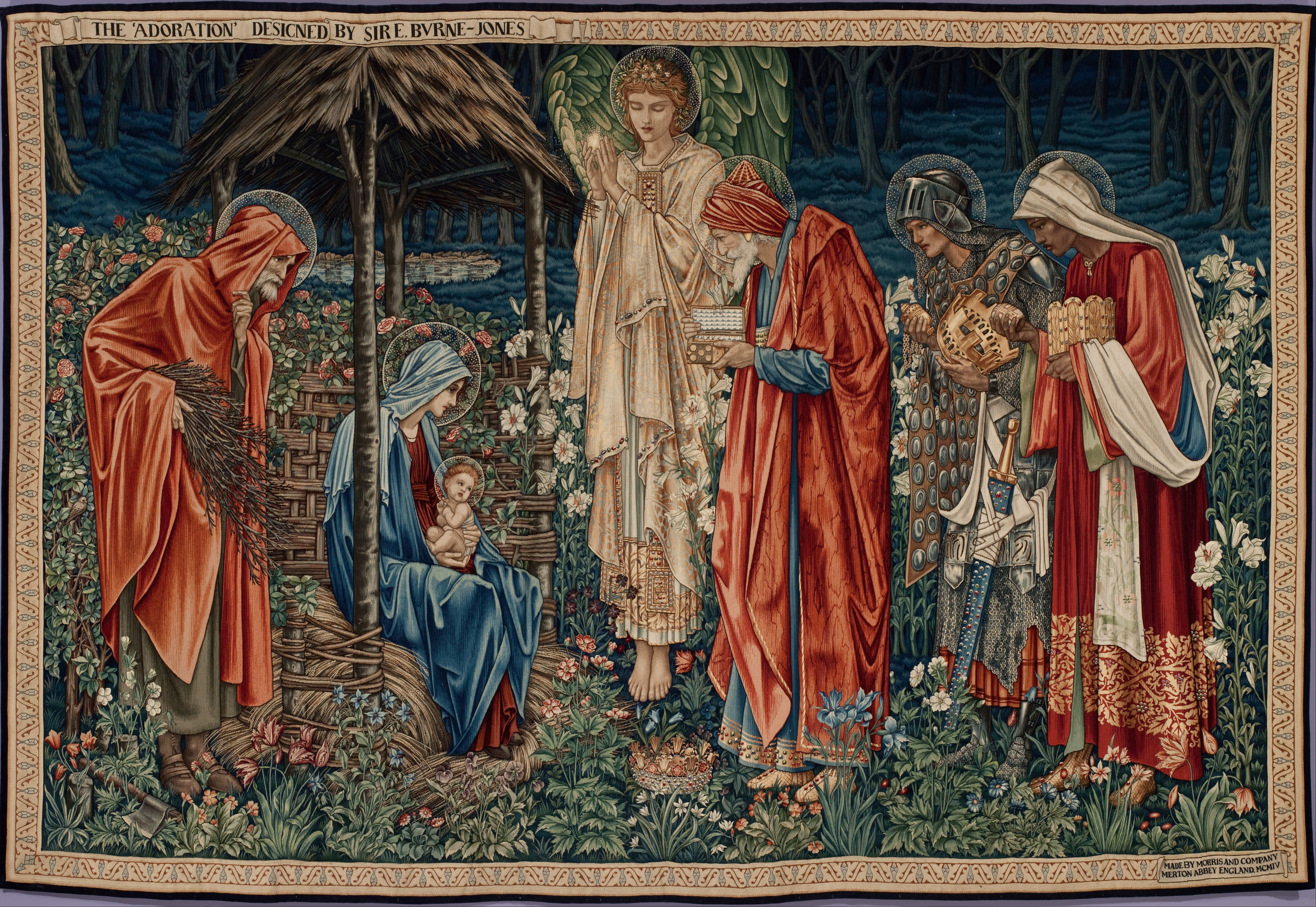
- The Adoration of the Magi by Edward Burne-Jones (1894)
- Also called: Baptism of Jesus, Three Kings Day, Denha, Little Christmas, Theophany, Timkat, Reyes, Uphalimass, Eid al-Ghitas, Eid al-Qiddas
- Observed by: Christians, Alawites
- Type: Church service, winter swimming, chalking the door, house blessings, star singing
- Significance: In Eastern Christianity and Alawism: commemoration of the Baptism of Jesus only; In Western Christianity: commemoration of the Adoration of the Magi, with subordinate commemorations of the Baptism of Jesus and the Wedding at Cana
- Date: January 6 (Gregorian calendar); January 19 (Gregorian equivalent of Julian calendar January 6); First Sunday after New Year's Day (some countries)
- Frequency: Annual
- Related to: Epiphanytide; Christmastide; Christmas; Baptism of the Lord; Nativity of Christ; New Year's Day

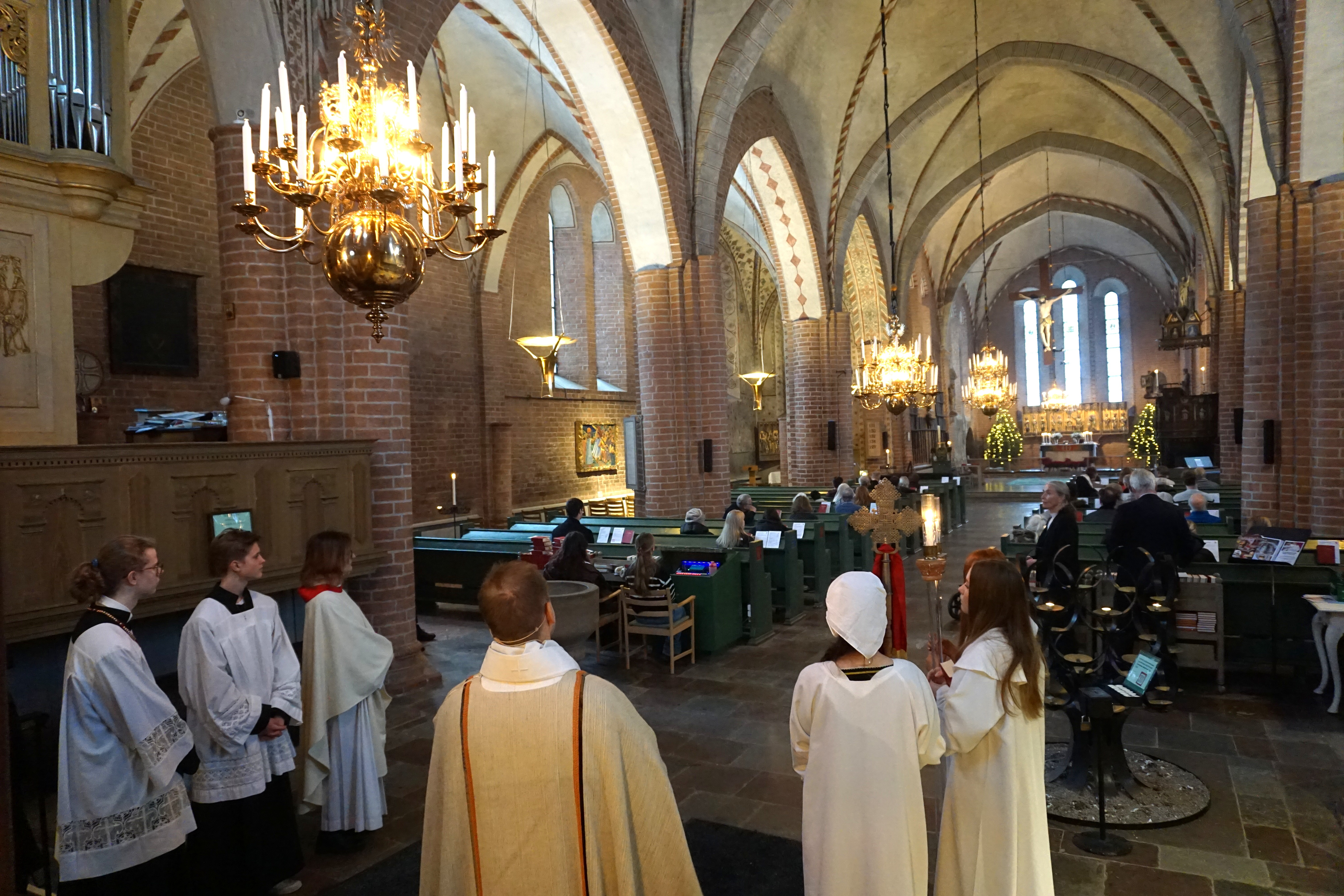
Lutheran priest and altar servers at Saint Mary's Church in Sigtuna, Sweden, standing in the narthex during recessional hymn at the end of Epiphany Day Mass

Epiphany (/əˈpɪfəni/ ə-PIF-ə-nee), also known as Theophany in Eastern Christian tradition, is a Christian feast day commemorating the visit of the Magi, the baptism of Jesus, and the wedding at Cana.

In Western Christianity, the feast commemorates principally (but not solely) the visit of the Magi to the Christ Child, and thus Jesus Christ's physical manifestation to the Gentiles. It is sometimes called Three Kings' Day, and in some traditions celebrated as Little Christmas. Moreover, the feast of the Epiphany, in some denominations, also initiates the liturgical season of Epiphanytide.

Eastern Christians, on the other hand, commemorate the baptism of Jesus in the River Jordan, seen as his manifestation to the world as the Son of God, and celebrate it as the Feast of the Epiphany or of the Theophany. The traditional site of the ministry of John the Baptist is in Al-Maghtas in Jordan, with the baptism of Jesus once marked in Byzantine times by a cross in the middle of the Jordan River, between the Jordanian site and Qasr al-Yahud in the West Bank.

The traditional date for the feast is January 6. However, since 1970 the celebration has been held in some countries on the Sunday after January 1. Those Eastern Churches that are still following the Julian calendar observe the feast on what, according to the internationally used Gregorian calendar, is 19 January, because of the current 13-day difference between the Julian and Gregorian calendars. The Alawites and the Middle Eastern Christians also observe the feast on January 19.

In many Western Churches, the eve of the feast is celebrated as Twelfth Night (Epiphany Eve) on January 5. The Monday after Epiphany is known as Plough Monday.

Popular Epiphany customs include Epiphany singing, chalking the door, having one's house blessed, consuming Three Kings Cake, winter swimming, as well as attending church services. It is customary for Christians in many localities to remove their Christmas decorations on Epiphany Eve (Twelfth Night), although those in other Christian countries historically remove them on Candlemas, the conclusion of Epiphanytide. According to one seventeenth-century tradition, it is inauspicious to remove Christmas decorations before Epiphany Eve and those who do not remove them on that date have the opportunity to take them down on Candlemas.

== Etymology ==
The word Epiphany is from Koine Greek ἐπιφάνεια, epipháneia, meaning manifestation or appearance. It is derived from the verb φαίνειν, phainein, meaning 'to appear'. In classical Greek it was used for the appearance of dawn, of an enemy in war, but especially of a manifestation of a deity to a worshipper (a theophany). In the Septuagint the word is used of a manifestation of the God of Israel (2 Maccabees 15:27). In the New Testament the word is used in 2 Timothy 1:10 to refer either to the birth of Christ or to his appearance after his resurrection, and five times to refer to his Second Coming.

Alternative names for the feast in Greek include τα Θεοφάνια (ta Theophánia; 'Theophany'; a neuter plural rather than feminine singular), η Ημέρα των Φώτων (i Iméra ton Fóton; 'The Day of the Lights'; modern Greek pronunciation), and τα Φώτα (ta Fóta, 'The Lights').

In Egypt, it is called Eid al-Ghitas (Arabic: عيد الغِطاس).

== History ==
=== Early history ===
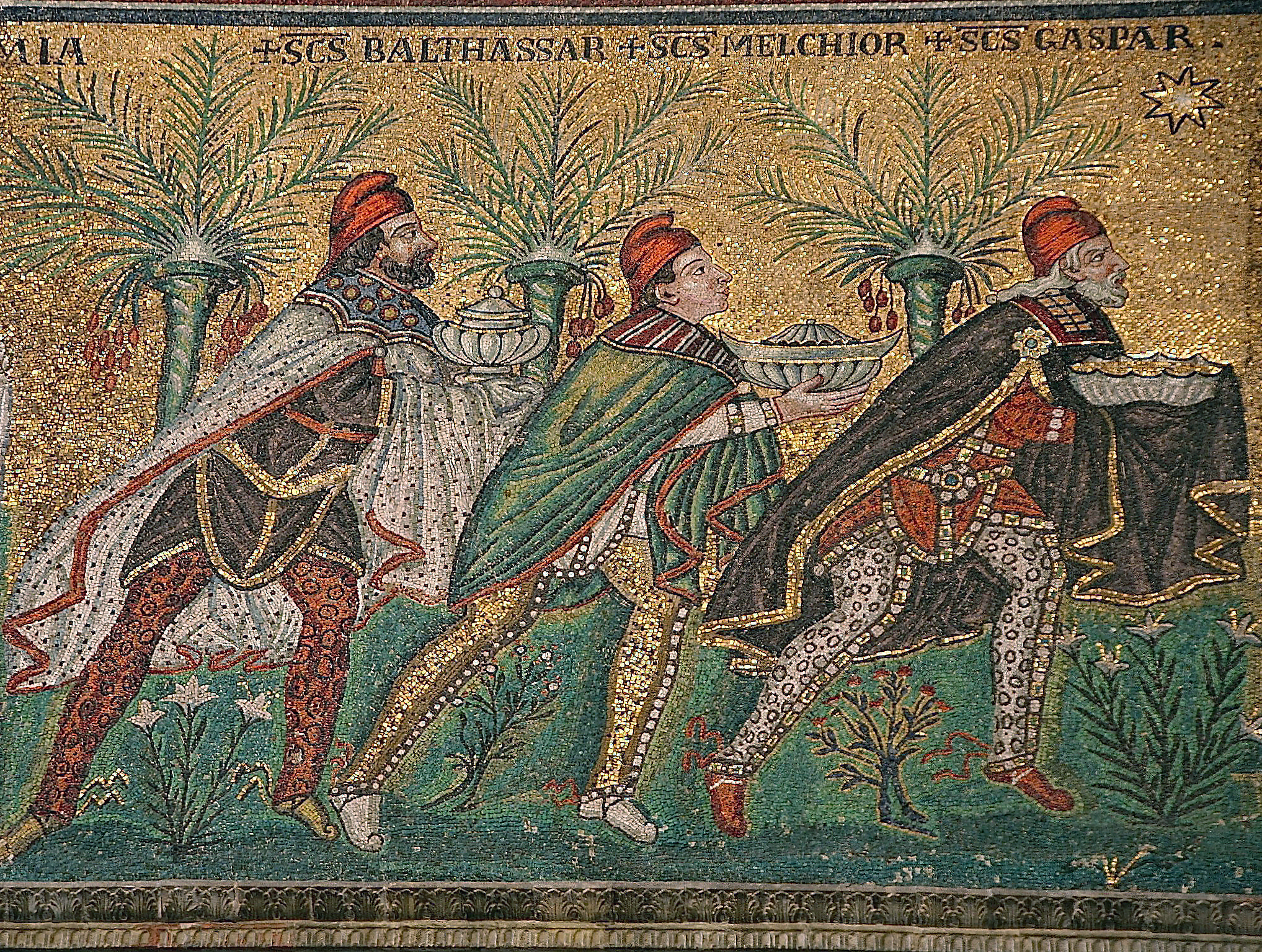
The Three Magi: Balthasar, Melchior, and Gaspar, from a late-6th-century mosaic at the Basilica of Sant'Apollinare Nuovo in Ravenna, Italy

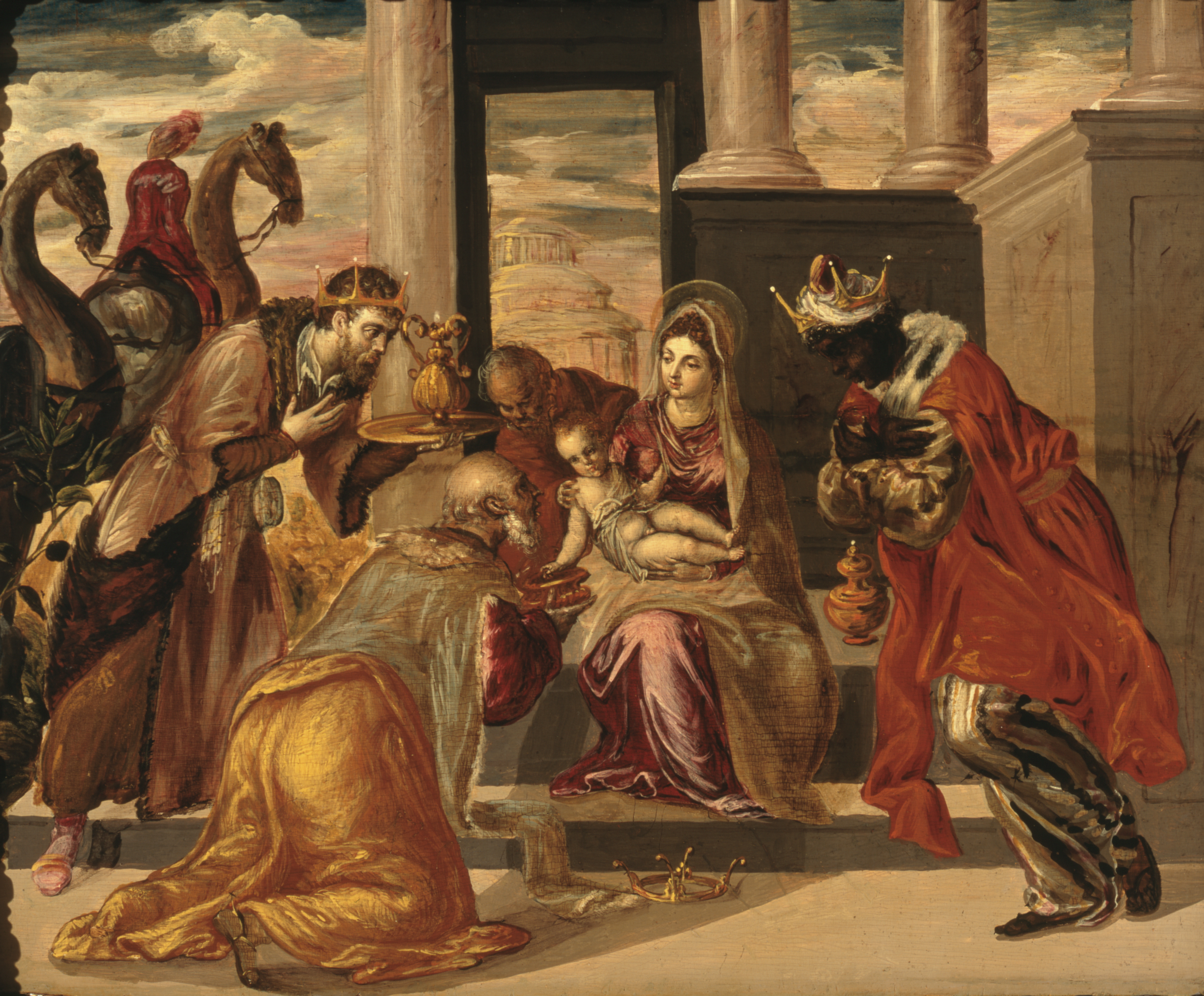
Adoration of the Magi by El Greco (1568, Museo Soumaya, Mexico City)

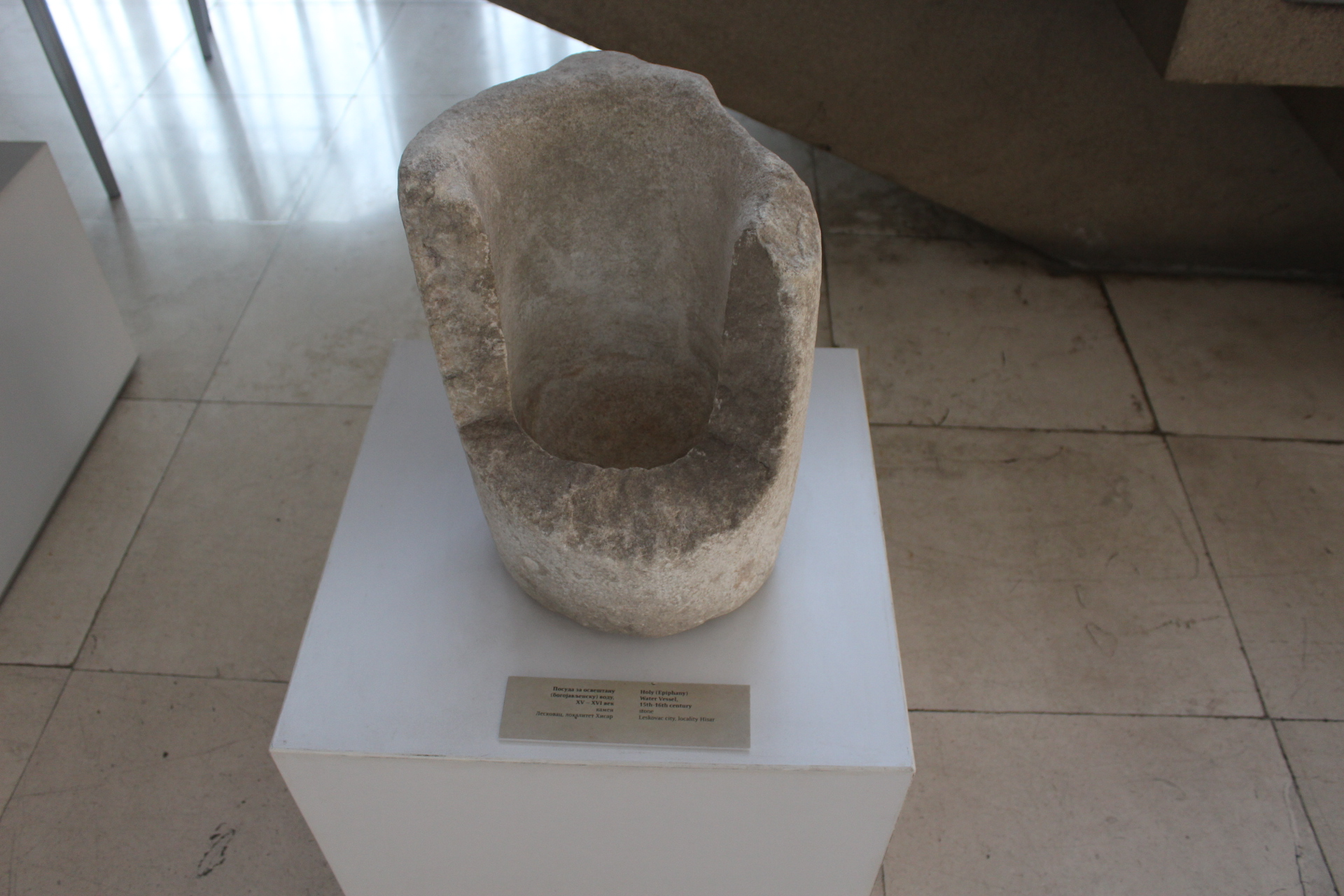
Holy (Epiphany) water vessel from the 15th–16th centuries, found on Hisar Hill near the town of Leskovac, Serbia. Photographed in the National Museum of Leskovac.

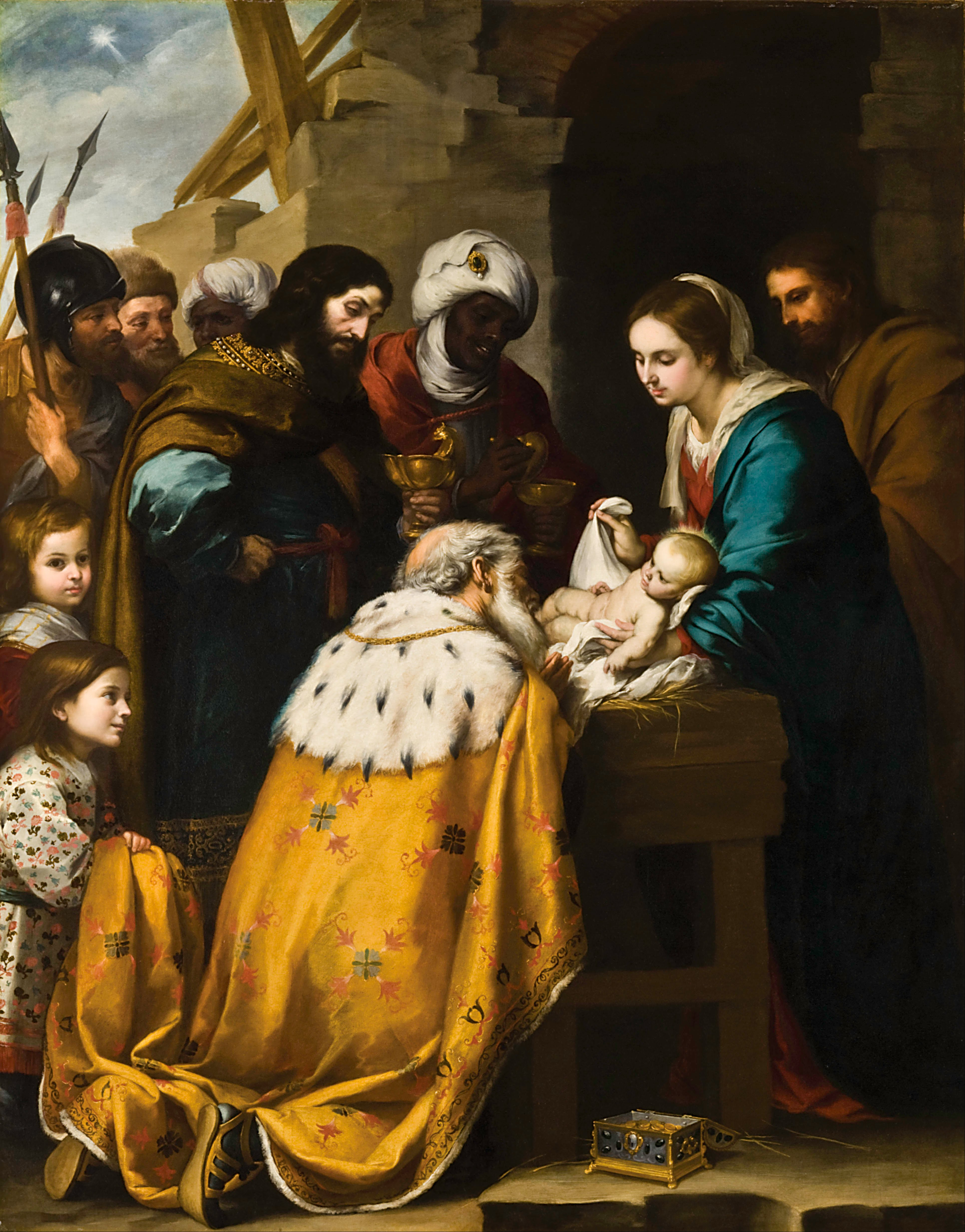
Adoration of the Magi by Bartolomé Esteban Murillo (17th century)

Epiphany may have originated in the Greek-speaking eastern half of the Roman Empire as a feast to honor the baptism of Jesus. Around 200, the theologian Clement of Alexandria wrote:

"But the followers of [the early Christian Gnostic teacher] Basilides celebrate the day of His Baptism too, spending the previous night in readings. And they say that it was the 15th of the month Tybi of the 15th year of Tiberius Caesar. And some say that it was observed the 11th of the same month."

— Clement of Alexandria (c. AD 200)

The Egyptian dates given correspond to January 6 and 10. The followers of Basilides were a Gnostic sect.

The reference to "readings" suggests that the Basilides were reading the Gospels. In ancient gospel manuscripts, the text is arranged to indicate passages for liturgical readings. If a congregation began reading Mark at the beginning of the year, it might arrive at the story of the Baptism on January 6, thus explaining the date of the feast. If Christians read Mark in the same format the Basilides did, the two groups could have arrived at the January 6 date independently.

The earliest reference to Epiphany as a Christian feast was in AD 361, by Ammianus Marcellinus. The holiday is listed twice, which suggests a double feast of baptism and birth. The baptism of Jesus was originally assigned to the same date as the birth because Luke 3:23 was read to mean that Jesus was exactly 30 when he was baptized; it is said by many Church Fathers that Jesus was the age of 30, although not necessarily exactly that age.

Epiphanius of Salamis says that January 6 is Christ's "Birthday; that is, His Epiphany" (hemera genethlion toutestin epiphanion). He also asserts that the Wedding at Cana occurred on the same calendar day. Epiphanius assigns the Baptism to November 6.

The scope to Epiphany expanded to include the commemoration of his birth; the visit of the Magi, all of Jesus' childhood events, up to and including the Baptism by John the Baptist; and even the miracle at the wedding at Cana in Galilee.

In the Latin-speaking West, the holiday emphasized the visit of the Magi. The Magi represented the non-Jewish peoples of the world, so this was considered a "revelation to the gentiles". In this event, Christian writers also inferred a revelation to the Israelites. John Chrysostom identified the significance of the meeting between the Magi and Herod's court:

"The star had been hidden from them so that, on finding themselves without their guide, they would have no alternative but to consult the Jews. In this way the birth of Jesus would be made known to all."

Even before 354, the Western Church had separated the celebration of the Nativity of Christ as the feast of Christmas and set its date as December 25; it reserved January 6 as a commemoration of the manifestation of Christ, especially to the Magi, but also at his baptism and at the wedding feast of Cana.

In 385, the pilgrim Egeria (also known as Silvia) described a celebration in Jerusalem and Bethlehem, which she called Epiphany that commemorated the Nativity. Even at this early date, there was an octave associated with the feast. The Georgian Chantbook of Jerusalem compiled in the mid 6th century contains hymns for this feast that were likely written between the time of Egeria and the turn of the 6th century.

In a sermon delivered on December 25, 380, St. Gregory of Nazianzus referred to the day as the Theophany (ta theophania, formerly the name of a pagan festival at Delphi), saying expressly that it is a day commemorating "the holy nativity of Christ" and told his listeners that they would soon be celebrating the baptism of Christ. Then, on January 6 and 7, he preached two more sermons, in which he declared that the celebration of the birth of Christ and the visitation of the Magi had already taken place, and that they would now commemorate his Baptism. At this time, celebration of the two events was beginning to be observed on separate occasions, at least in Cappadocia.

St. John Cassian says that even in his time (beginning of the 5th century), Egyptian monasteries celebrated the Nativity and the Baptism together on January 6. The Armenian Apostolic Church continues to celebrate January 6 as the only commemoration of the Nativity.

=== Modern period ===
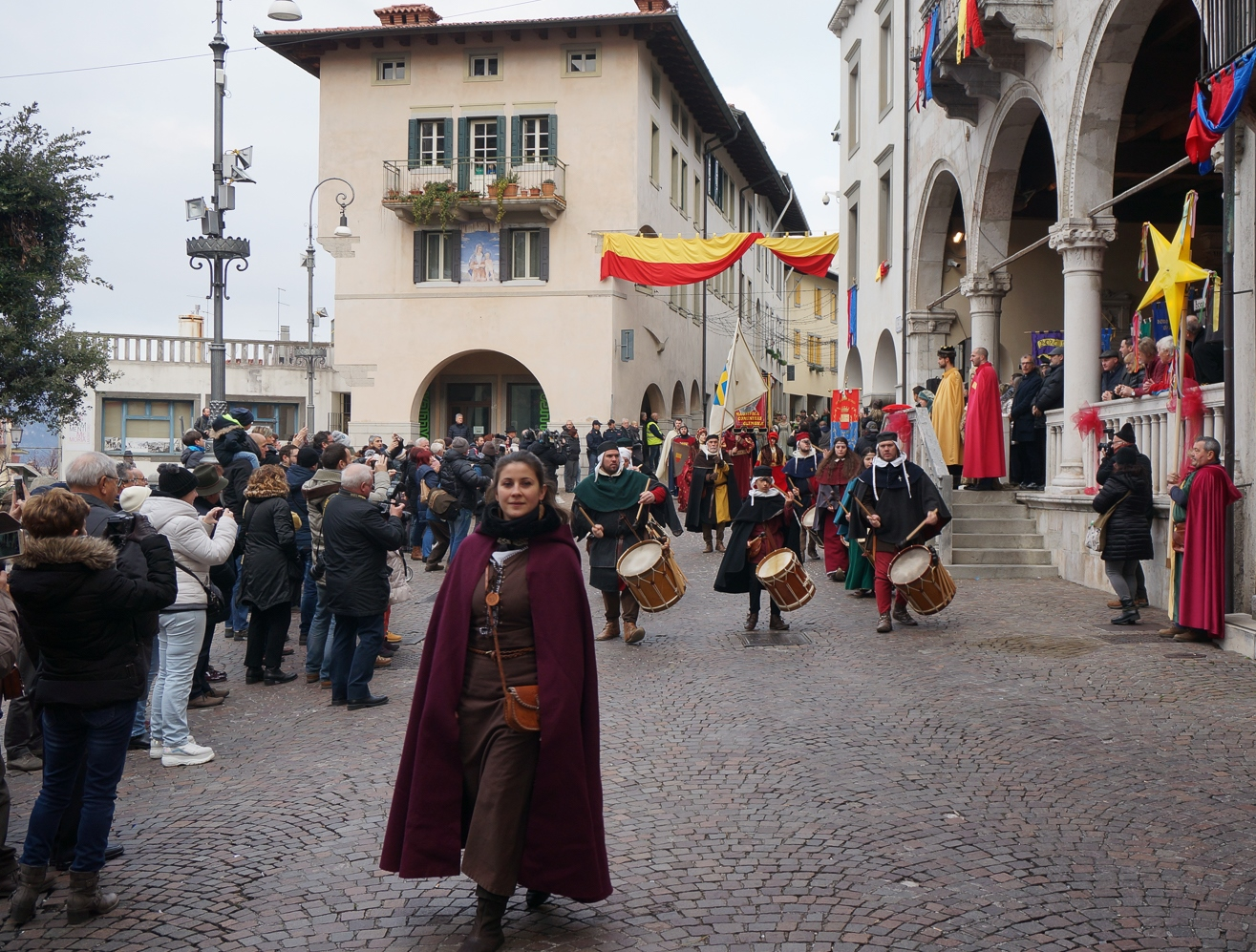
Epiphany celebration in Gemona del Friuli, Italy

In the Latin Church, Epiphany is traditionally celebrated with an octave, beginning on January 6 and ending on January 13. From 1893 until 1955 the Sunday within that octave had been the feast of the Holy Family, and Christmastide was reckoned as the twelve days ending on January 5, followed by the January 6–13 octave. Before the 1969 revision of its liturgy, the Sundays following the Octave of Epiphany or, when this was abolished, following the Feast of the Baptism of the Lord, which was instituted to take the place of the Octave of Epiphany were named as the "Second (etc., up to Sixth) Sunday after Epiphany", as the at least 24 Sundays following Pentecost Sunday and Trinity Sunday were known as the "Second (etc.) Sunday after Pentecost". (If a year had more than 24 Sundays after Pentecost, up to four unused post-Epiphany Sundays were inserted between the 23rd and the 24th Sunday after Pentecost.) The Encyclopedia of Catholic Devotions and Practices, which received the imprimatur of John Michael D'Arcy, with reference to Epiphanytide, thus states that "the Epiphany season extends from January 6 to Septuagesima Sunday, and has from one to six Sundays, according to the date of Easter. White is the color for the octave; green is the liturgical color for the season."

In 1955, Pope Pius XII abolished all but three liturgical octaves, thus deleting that of Epiphany, and the 1969 revision of the General Roman Calendar instituted the current system which makes the date variable to some extent. It also made the Feast of the Epiphany part of Christmastide, which it defined as extending from the First Vespers of Christmas (the evening of December 24) up to and including the Sunday after Epiphany (the Sunday after January 6). In 1955 a separate feast of the Baptism of the Lord was also instituted, thus weakening further the connection in the West between the feast of the Epiphany and the commemoration of the baptism of Christ. (Hungarians, in an apparent reference to baptism, refer to the January 6 celebration as Vízkereszt, a term that recalls the words víz ('water') and kereszt or kereszt-ség ('baptism').)

Prior to 1976, Anglican churches also observed an octave beginning on January 6.

== Epiphany by Christian tradition ==
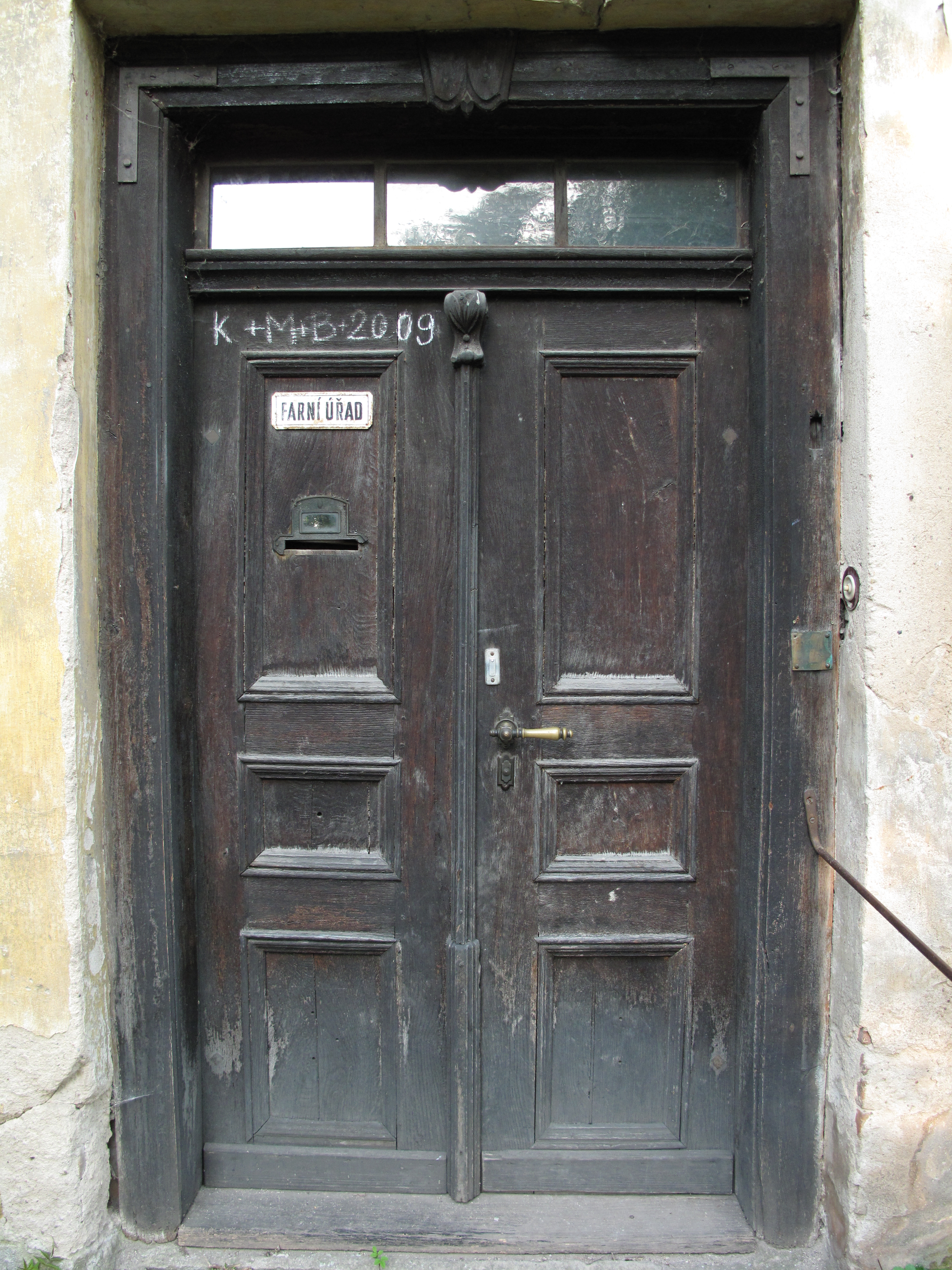
K † M † B † 2009 written on a door of a rectory in a Czech village, to bless the house by Christ. Christians of various denominations, including Catholics, Lutherans and Anglicans practice the chalking the door on Epiphanytide.

Epiphany is celebrated by both the Eastern and Western Churches, but a major difference between them is precisely which events the feast commemorates. For Western Christians, the feast primarily commemorates the coming of the Magi, with only a minor reference to the baptism of Jesus and the miracle at the wedding at Cana. Eastern churches celebrate the baptism of Christ in the Jordan. In both traditions, the essence of the feast is the same: the manifestation of Christ to the world (whether as an infant or in the Jordan), and the Mystery of the Incarnation. The miracle at the wedding at Cana is also celebrated during Epiphany as a first manifestation of Christ's public life.

In some Churches, the feast of the Epiphany initiates the Epiphany season, also known as Epiphanytide.

=== Catholic Church ===
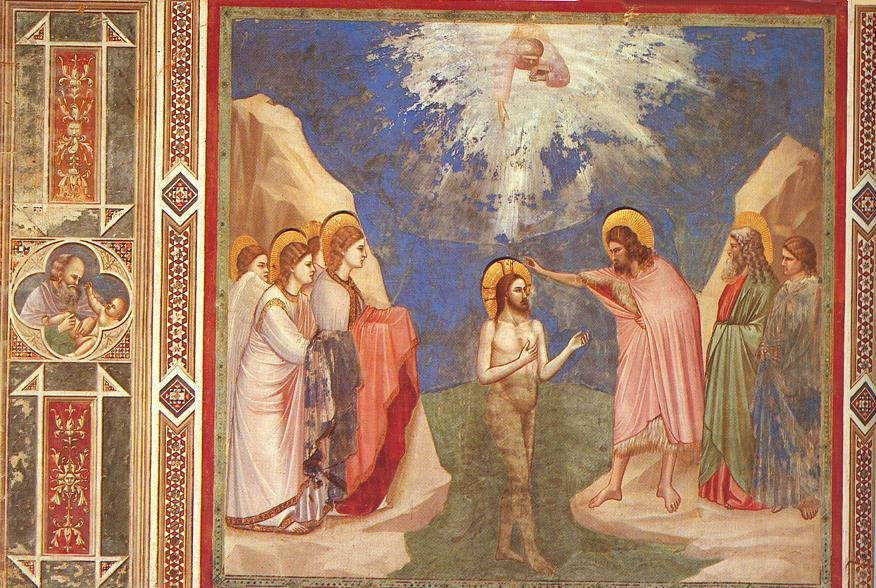
Baptism of Christ fresco by Giotto di Bondone, c. 1305 (Cappella Scrovegni, Padua, Italy)

In the Catholic Church, Epiphany is either observed on the traditional fixed date of January 6, or it is transferred to the Sunday between January 2 and January 8. Most dioceses in the United States observe the latter. In each system, the date of Epiphany affects the dates of other feasts:

- Where Epiphany is always celebrated on January 6, the Feast of the Baptism of the Lord is celebrated the following Sunday. During years where there are two Sundays between Christmas and Epiphany, the second is known as the "Second Sunday after Christmas".
- Where Epiphany is on a moveable date and does not occur on January 6, it is moved earlier to replace the Second Sunday after Christmas in years where it would have occurred; otherwise it is moved later to the following Sunday, and displaces the Feast of the Baptism to the following Monday.

Currently, Epiphany is considered part of Christmas Time, which runs from First Vespers (Evening Prayer I) of Christmas up to and including the Sunday after Epiphany, with Ordinary Time beginning on the following Monday. Some regions and especially some communities celebrating the Tridentine Mass extend the season to as many as forty days, ending Christmastide traditionally on Candlemas (February 2).

On the Feast of the Epiphany in some parts of central Europe the priest, wearing white vestments, blesses Epiphany water, frankincense, gold, and chalk. The chalk is used to write the initials of the three magi (traditionally, Caspar, Melchior, and Balthasar), over the doors of churches and homes. The initials may also be interpreted as the Latin phrase, Christus mansionem benedicat (may Christ bless the house).

According to ancient custom, the priest announced the date of Easter on the feast of Epiphany. This tradition dated from a time when calendars were not readily available, and the church needed to publicize the date of Easter, since many celebrations of the liturgical year depend on it. The proclamation may be sung or proclaimed at the ambo by a deacon, cantor, or reader either after the reading of the Gospel or after the postcommunion prayer.

The Roman Missal thus provides a formula with appropriate chant (in the tone of the Exsultet) for proclaiming on Epiphany, wherever it is customary to do so, the dates in the calendar for the celebration of Ash Wednesday, Easter Sunday, Ascension of Jesus Christ, Pentecost, the Body and Blood of Christ, and the First Sunday of Advent that will mark the following liturgical year.

=== Protestant churches ===
Lutheran, Anglican, Moravian, Methodist and United Protestant congregations, along with those of other denominations, may celebrate Epiphany on January 6, on the following Sunday within the Epiphany week (octave), or at another time (Epiphany Eve January 5, the nearest Sunday, etc.) as local custom dictates. Many in the West, such as adherents of the Anglican Communion, Lutheran Churches and Methodist Churches, observe a twelve-day festival, starting on December 25, and ending on January 5, known as Christmastide or The Twelve Days of Christmas, which the Epiphany season follows.

Today, The Epiphany of our Lord, classified as a Principal Feast, is observed in some Anglican provinces on January 6 exclusively (e.g., the Anglican Church of Canada) but in the Church of England the celebration is "on 6 January or transferred to the Sunday falling between 2 and 8 January". In Advent 2000, the Church of England, mother church of the Anglican Communion, introduced into its liturgy an optional Epiphany season by approving the Common Worship series of services as an alternative to those in the Book of Common Prayer, which remains the Church's normative liturgy and in which no such liturgical season appears. An official publication of the Church of England states: "The Christmas season is often celebrated for twelve days, ending with the Epiphany. Contemporary use has sought to express an alternative tradition, in which Christmas lasts for a full forty days, ending with the Feast of the Presentation on 2 February." It presents the latter part of this period as the Epiphany season, comprising the Sundays of Epiphany and ending "only with the Feast of the Presentation (Candlemas)".

Another interpretation of Epiphany season applies the term to the period from Epiphany to the day before Ash Wednesday. Some Methodists in the United States and Singapore follow these liturgies. Lutherans celebrate the last Sunday before Ash Wednesday as the Transfiguration of our Lord, and it has been said that they call the whole period from Epiphany to then as Epiphany season. The Evangelical Lutheran Church in America used the terms "Time after Epiphany" to refer to this period. The expression with "after" has been interpreted as making the period in question correspond to that of Ordinary Time.

The Presbyterian Church (USA) does not celebrate Epiphany or Pentecost as seasons; for this Church, expressions such as Fifth Sunday after Epiphany indicate the passing of time, rather than a liturgical season. It instead uses the term Ordinary Time.

Some Western rite churches in the Protestant tradition, such as the Lutheran and Anglican churches, follow practices similar to the Catholic Church. Church cantatas for the Feast of Epiphany were written by Protestant composers such as Georg Philipp Telemann, Christoph Graupner, Johann Sebastian Bach and Gottfried Heinrich Stölzel.

=== Eastern Orthodox churches ===
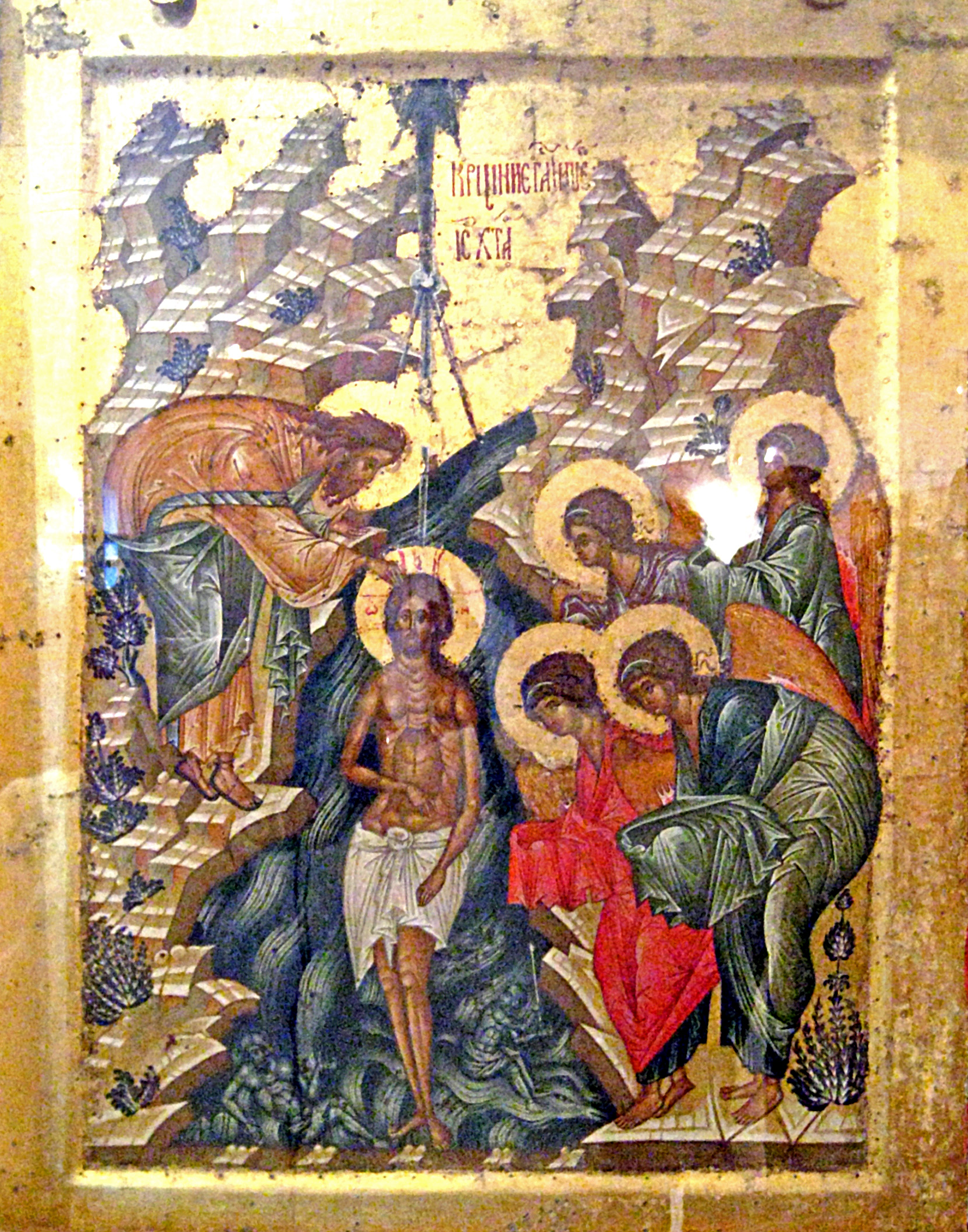
Russian icon of the Theophany (Kirillo-Belozersky Monastery, 1497)

Eastern churches celebrate Epiphany (Theophany) on January 6. Some, as in Greece, employ the Revised Julian calendar, which until 2800 coincides with the Gregorian calendar, the one in use for civil purposes in most countries. Other Eastern churches, as in Russia, hold to the older Julian calendar for reckoning church dates. In these old-calendar churches Epiphany falls at present on Gregorian January 19 – which is January 6 in the Julian calendar.

The name of the feast as celebrated in the Orthodox churches may be rendered in English as the Theophany, as closer in form to the Greek Θεοφάνια ("God shining forth" or "divine manifestation"). Here it is one of the Great Feasts of the liturgical year, being third in rank, behind only Paskha (Easter) and Pentecost in importance. It is celebrated on January 6 of the calendar that a particular Church uses. On the Julian calendar, which some of the Orthodox churches follow, that date corresponds, during the present century, to January 19 on the Gregorian or Revised Julian calendar. The earliest reference to the feast in the Eastern Church is a remark by St. Clement of Alexandria in Stromateis, I, xxi, 45:

And there are those who have determined not only the year of our Lord's birth, but also the day… And the followers of Basilides hold the day of his baptism as a festival, spending the night before in readings. And they say that it was the fifteenth year of Tiberius Caesar, the fifteenth day of the month of Tubi; and some that it was the eleventh of the same month.

(11 and 15 of Tubi are January 6 and 10, respectively.)

If this is a reference to a celebration of Christ's birth, as well as of his baptism, on January 6, it corresponds to what continues to be the custom of the Armenian Apostolic Church, which celebrates the birth of Jesus on January 6 of the calendar used, calling the feast that of the Nativity and Theophany of Our Lord.

Origen's list of festivals (in Contra Celsum, VIII, xxii) omits any reference to Epiphany. The first reference to an ecclesiastical feast of the Epiphany, in Ammianus Marcellinus (XXI:ii), is in 361.

In parts of the Eastern Church, January 6 continued for some time as a composite feast that included the Nativity of Jesus: though Constantinople adopted December 25 to commemorate Jesus' birth in the fourth century, in other parts the Nativity of Jesus continued to be celebrated on January 6, a date later devoted exclusively to commemorating his Baptism.

Today in Eastern Orthodox churches, the emphasis at this feast is on the shining forth and revelation of Jesus Christ as the Messiah and Second Person of the Trinity at the time of his baptism. It is also celebrated because, according to tradition, the baptism of Jesus in the Jordan River by St. John the Baptist marked one of only two occasions when all three Persons of the Trinity manifested themselves simultaneously to humanity: God the Father by speaking through the clouds, God the Son being baptized in the river, and God the Holy Spirit in the shape of a dove descending from heaven (the other occasion was the Transfiguration on Mount Tabor). Thus the holy day is considered to be a Trinitarian feast.

The Orthodox consider Jesus' Baptism to be the first step towards the Crucifixion, and there are some parallels in the hymnography used on this day and the hymns chanted on Good Friday.

==== Liturgical practice in Eastern churches ====
Forefeast: The liturgical Forefeast of Theophany begins on January 2 and concludes with the Paramony on January 5.

Paramony: The Eve of the Feast is called Paramony (Greek: παραμονή, Slavonic: navechérie). Paramony is observed as a strict fast day, on which those faithful who are physically able, refrain from food until the first star is observed in the evening, when a meal with wine and oil may be taken. On this day the Royal Hours are celebrated, thus tying together this feast with Nativity and Good Friday. The Royal Hours are followed by the Divine Liturgy of St. Basil which combines Vespers with the Divine Liturgy. During the Vespers, fifteen Old Testament lections which foreshadow the Baptism of Christ are read, and special antiphons are chanted. If the Feast of the Theophany falls on a Sunday or Monday, the Royal Hours are chanted on the previous Friday, and on the Paramony the Divine Liturgy of St. John Chrysostom is celebrated in the morning. The fasting is lessened to some degree in this case.

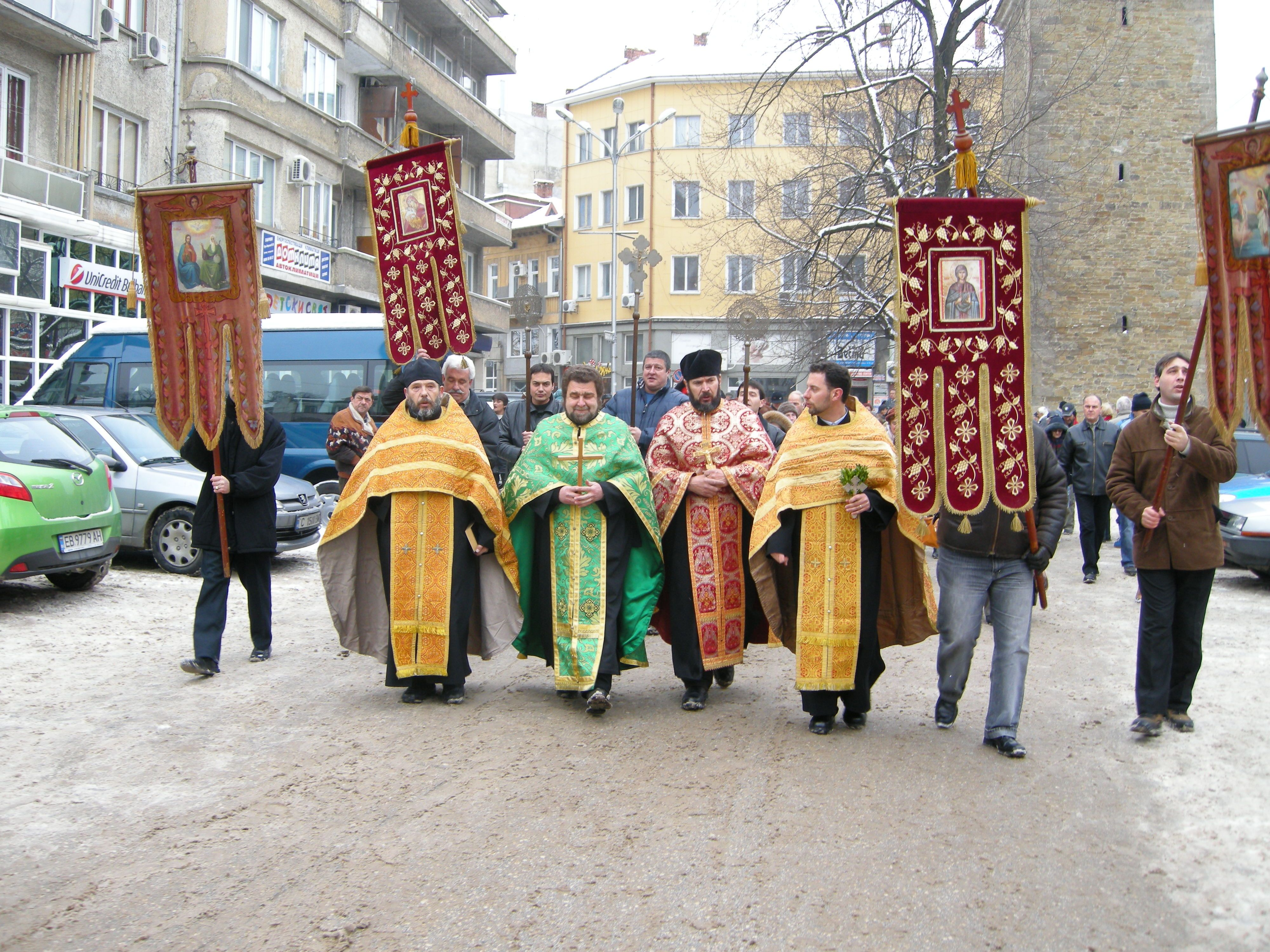
Theophany Crucession in Bulgaria. The priests are going to throw a wooden cross in the Yantra river. Believers will then jump into the icy waters to recover the cross.

Blessing of Waters: The Orthodox Churches perform the Great Blessing of Waters on Theophany. The blessing is normally done twice: once on the Eve of the Feast – usually at a Baptismal font inside the church – and then again on the day of the feast, outdoors at a body of water. Following the Divine Liturgy, the clergy and people go in a Crucession (procession with the cross) to the nearest body of water, be it a beach, harbor, quay, river, lake, swimming pool, water depot, etc. (ideally, it should be a body of "living water"). At the end of the ceremony the priest will bless the waters. In the Greek practice, he does this by casting a cross into the water. If swimming is feasible on the spot, any number of volunteers may try to recover the cross. The person who gets the cross first swims back and returns it to the priest, who then delivers a special blessing to the swimmer and their household. Certain such ceremonies have achieved particular prominence, such as the one held annually at Tarpon Springs, Florida. In Russia, where the winters are severe, a hole will be cut into the ice so that the waters may be blessed. In such conditions, the cross is not cast into the water, but is held securely by the priest and dipped three times into the water.

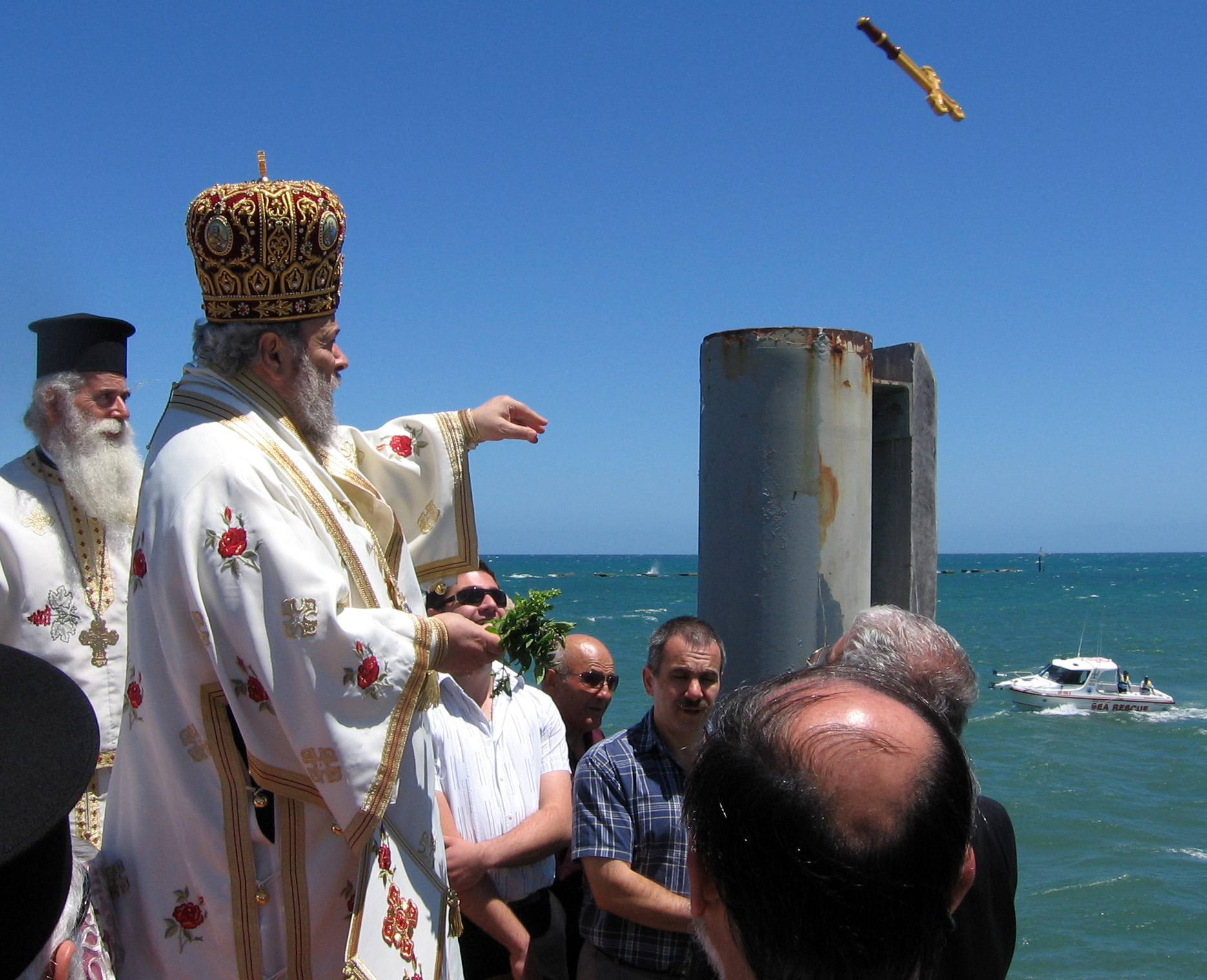
Greek Orthodox bishop at the Great Blessing of Waters on Theophany, releasing the cross off the Glenelg Jetty, South Australia, for one of the swimmers below to retrieve

The water that is blessed on this day is sometimes known as "Theophany Water", though usually just "holy water", and is taken home by the faithful, and used with prayer as a blessing. People will not only bless themselves and their homes by sprinkling with holy water, but will also drink it. The Orthodox Church teaches that holy water differs from ordinary water by virtue of the incorruptibility bestowed upon it by a blessing that transforms its very nature. a miracle attested to as early as St. John Chrysostom.

Theophany is a traditional day for performing Baptisms, and this is reflected in the Divine Liturgy by singing the baptismal hymn, "As many as have been baptized into Christ, have put on Christ. Alleluia," in place of the Trisagion.

House Blessings: On Theophany the priest will begin making the round of the parishioner's homes to bless them. He will perform a short prayer service in each home, and then go through the entire house, gardens and outside-buildings, blessing them with the newly blessed Theophany Water, while all sing the Troparion and Kontakion of the feast. This is normally done on Theophany, or at least during the Afterfeast, but if the parishioners are numerous, and especially if many live far away from the church, it may take some time to bless each house. Traditionally, these blessings should all be finished before the beginning of Great Lent.

Afterfeast: The Feast of Theophany is followed by an eight-day Afterfeast on which the normal fasting laws are suspended. The Saturday and Sunday after Theophany have special readings assigned to them, which relate to the Temptation of Christ and to penance and perseverance in the Christian struggle. There is thus a liturgical continuum between the Feast of Theophany and the beginning of Great Lent.

=== Oriental Orthodox ===
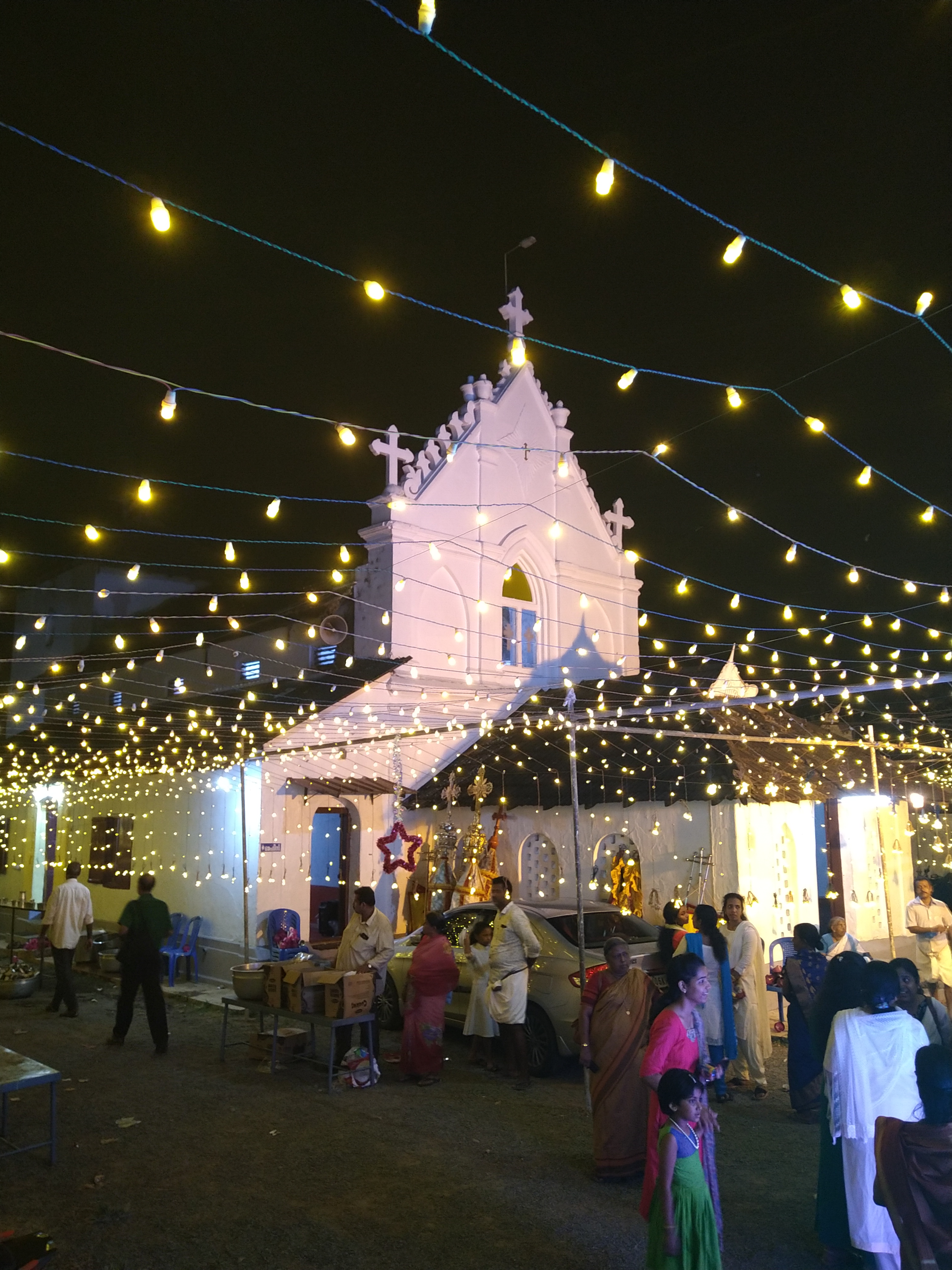
Epiphany in Kerala, India

In the Ethiopian Orthodox Church, the feast is known as Timkat and is celebrated on the day that the Gregorian calendar calls January 19, but on January 20 in years when Enkutatash in the Ethiopian calendar falls on Gregorian September 12 (i.e. when the following February in the Gregorian calendar will have 29 days). The celebration of this feast features blessing of water and solemn processions with the sacred tabot. A priest carries this to a body of water where it stays overnight, with the Metsehafe Qeddassie celebrated in the early morning. Later in the morning, the water is blessed to the accompaniment of the reading of the four Gospel accounts of the baptism of Jesus in the Jordan and the people are sprinkled with or go into the water. The tabot returns in procession to the church.

Among the Syriac Christians the feast is called denho (up-going), a name to be connected with the notion of rising light expressed in Luke 1:78. In the East Syriac rite, the season of Epiphany (Epiphanytide) is known as Denha.

In the Armenian Apostolic Church, January 6 is celebrated as the Nativity (Soorp Tsnund) and Theophany of Christ. The feast is preceded by a seven-day fast. On the eve of the feast, the Divine Liturgy is celebrated. This liturgy is referred to as the Chragaluytsi Patarag (the Eucharist of the lighting of the lamps) in honor of the manifestation of Jesus as the Son of God. Both the Armenian Apostolic Church's and Assyrian Church of the East's liturgy is followed by a blessing of water, during which the cross is immersed in the water, symbolizing Jesus' descent into the Jordan, and holy myron (chrism) is poured in, symbolic of the descent of the Holy Spirit upon Jesus. The next morning, after the Liturgy, the cross is removed from the vessel of holy water and all come forward to kiss the cross and partake of the blessed water.

The Indian Orthodox Church celebrates the feast of Epiphany, Denaha [Syriac term which means rising] on January 6, and the Ethiopian Orthodox Church celebrates on January 19 as the Timkath festival, which was included in the UNESCO heritage list of festivals.

== Music ==
=== Classical ===
In Leipzig, Johann Sebastian Bach composed two cantatas for the feast which concluded Christmastide: Sie werden aus Saba alle kommen, BWV 65, (1724) and Liebster Immanuel, Herzog der Frommen, BWV 123, (1725).

Part VI of his Christmas Oratorio, Herr, wenn die stolzen Feinde schnauben, was also designated to be performed during the service for Epiphany.

The first three movements of Felix Mendelssohn's oratorio Christus are sometimes sung at Epiphany as they make reference to the Magi and the Star of Bethlehem.

In Ottorino Respighi's symphonic tone poem Roman Festivals, the final movement is subtitled "Bofana" and takes place during Epiphany.

=== Carols and hymns ===
"Nun liebe Seel, nun ist es Zeit" is a German Epiphany hymn by Georg Weissel, first printed in 1642.

Two popular Christmas carols are associated with the Epiphany holiday: "As with Gladness Men of Old", written by William Chatterton Dix in 1860 as a response to the many legends which had grown up surrounding the Magi; and "We Three Kings of Orient Are", written by the Reverend John Henry Hopkins Jr. – then an ordained deacon in the Episcopal Church – who was instrumental in organizing an elaborate holiday pageant (which featured this hymn) for the students of the General Theological Seminary in New York City in 1857 while serving as the seminary's music director.

Another popular hymn, less known culturally as a carol, is "Songs of thankfulness and praise", with words written by Christopher Wordsworth and commonly sung to the tune "St. Edmund" by Charles Steggall.

A carol used as an anthem for the Epiphany is "The Three Kings".

== National and local customs ==
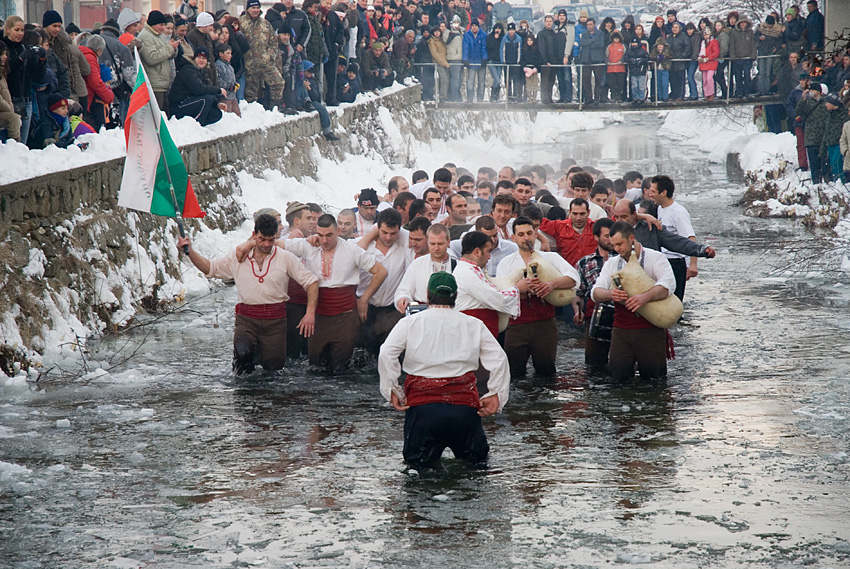
A traditional Bulgarian all-male horo dance in ice-cold water on Theophany

Epiphany is celebrated with a wide array of customs around the world. In some cultures, the greenery and nativity scenes put up at Christmas are taken down at Epiphany. In other cultures these remain up until Candlemas on February 2. In countries historically shaped by Western Christianity (Roman Catholicism, Protestantism) these customs often involve gift giving, king cakes and a celebratory close to the Christmas season. In traditionally Orthodox nations, water, baptismal rites and house blessings are typically central to these celebrations.

=== Argentina, Paraguay, and Uruguay ===
In Argentina, Paraguay, and Uruguay, as in other Latin American countries, the day is called Día de Reyes (The Day of Kings, a reference to the Biblical Magi), commemorating the arrival of the Magi to revere Jesus as son of God. The night of January 5 into the morning of January 6 is known as "Noche de Reyes" (The Night of Kings) and children leave their shoes by the door, along with grass and water for the camels. On the morning of January 6, they get up early and rush to see their shoes, where they are expecting to find gifts left by the "Reyes" who, according to tradition, bypass the houses of children who are awake. On January 6, a "Rosca de Reyes" (a ring-shaped Epiphany cake) is eaten and all Christmas decorations are traditionally put away.

=== Assyrians in Iraq and Syria ===
Assyrian Christians in Iraq celebrate the feast of Epiphany, "Etha de Denha" ('rising' in Neo-Aramaic) on January 6, this holiday is celebrated by people of all ages splashing water at each other with buckets or hoses as a symbol of Jesus's baptism.

=== Bulgaria ===
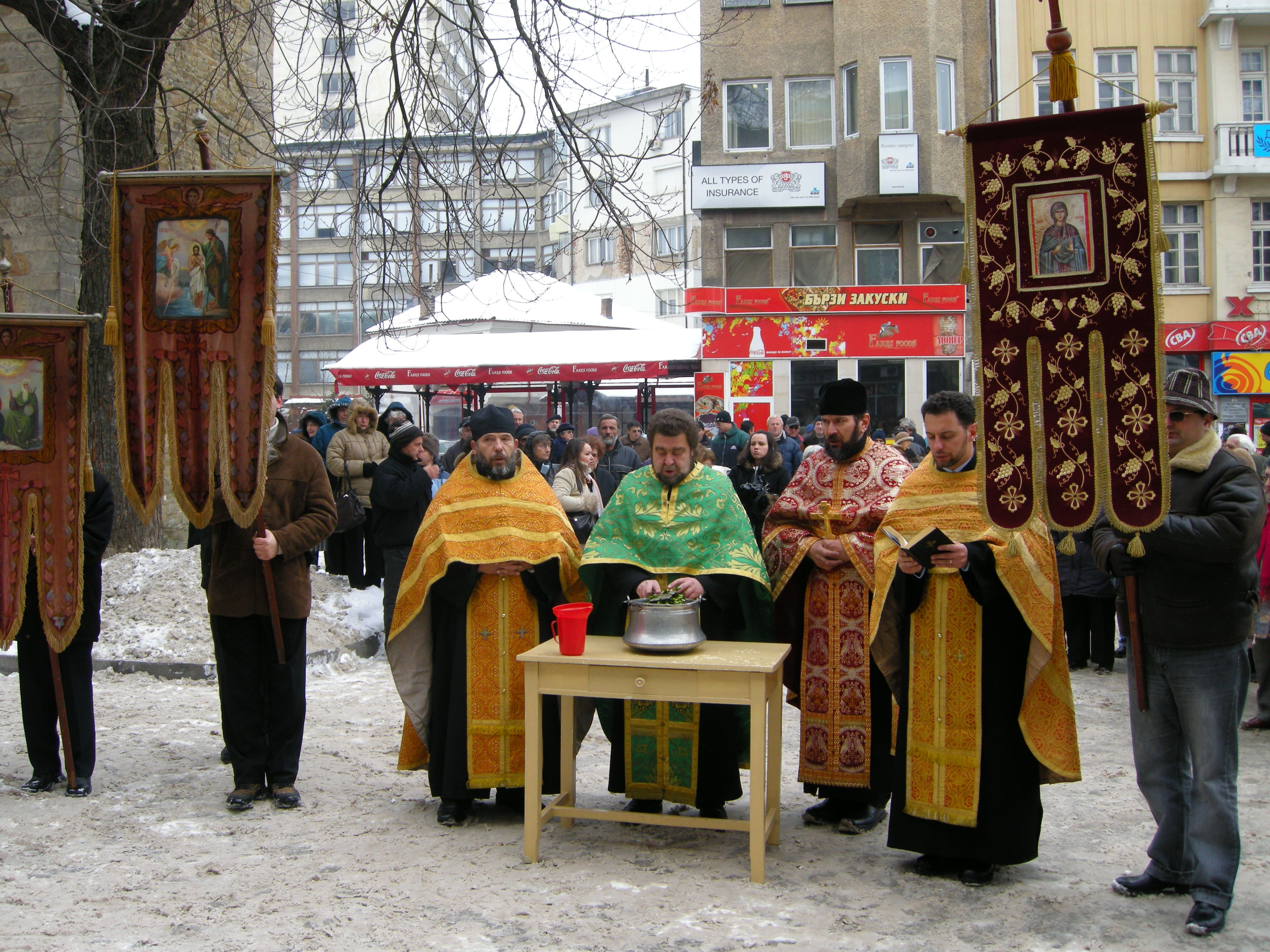
Epiphany celebration in Gabrovo, Bulgaria

In Bulgaria, Epiphany is celebrated on January 6 and is known as Bogoyavlenie ("Manifestation of God"), Кръщение Господне (Krashtenie Gospodne or "Baptism of the Lord") or Yordanovden ("Day of Jordan", referring to the river). On this day, a wooden cross is thrown by a priest into the sea, river or lake and young men race to retrieve it. As the date is in early January and the waters are close to freezing, this is considered an honorable act and it is said that good health will be bestowed upon the home of the swimmer who is the first to reach the cross.

In the town of Kalofer, a traditional horo with drums and bagpipes is played in the icy waters of the Tundzha river before the throwing of the cross.

=== Benelux ===
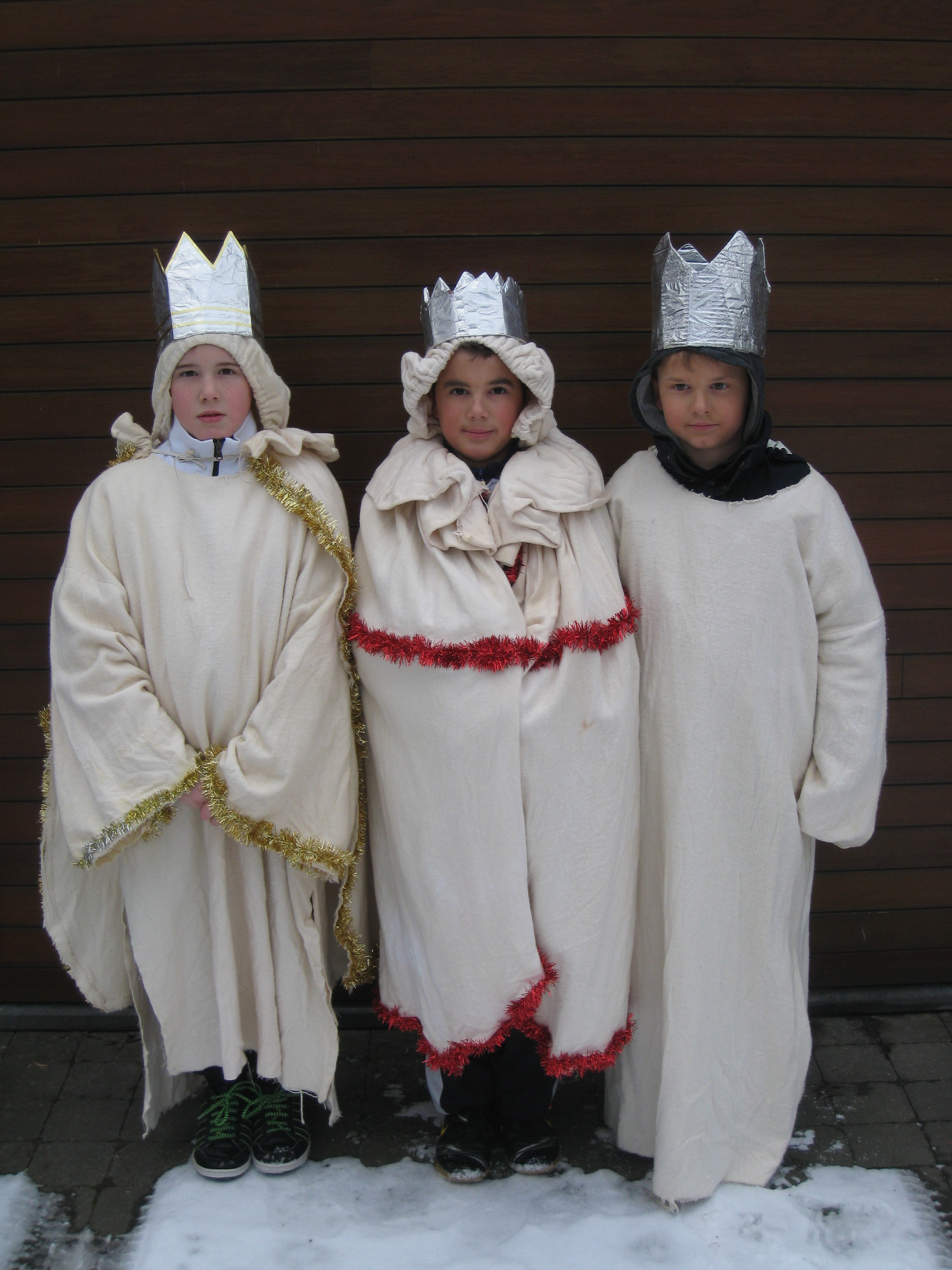
Children in Flanders celebrating Driekoningen

Speakers of Dutch and Flemish call this day Driekoningen (Three kings), while German speakers call it Dreikönigstag (Three Kings' Day). In Belgium, Luxembourg, the southern parts of the Netherlands and in neighboring Germany, children in groups of three (symbolizing the Biblical Magi) proceed in costume from house to house while singing songs typical for the occasion, and receiving a coin or some sweets at each door. They may each carry a paper lantern symbolizing the star. In the Netherlands (provinces of Brabant and Limburg only), these troupes gather for competitions and present their skits/songs for an audience. As in Belgium, Koningentaart (Kings' tart), puff pastry with almond filling, is prepared with a black bean hidden inside. Whoever finds the bean in his or her piece is king or queen for the day. A more typically Dutch version is Koningenbrood, or Kings' bread. In the north of the Netherlands, the traditions have died out, except for a very few places. Another Low Countries tradition on Epiphany is to open up doors and windows to let good luck in for the coming year.

=== Brazil ===
In Brazil, the day is called "Dia dos Reis" (The Day of Kings) and in the rest of Latin America "Día de Reyes" commemorating the arrival of the Magi to confirm Jesus as son of God. The night of January 5 into the morning of January 6 is known as "Night of Kings" (also called the Twelfth Night) and is feasted with music, sweets and regional dishes as the last night of Nativity, when Christmas decorations are traditionally put away.

=== Chile ===
In Chile, this day is sometimes known as the Día de los Tres Reyes Magos ('The Day of the Three Royal Magi') or La Pascua de los Negros ('Holy Day of the Black Men'), although the latter is rarely heard, because it was the day when slaves were allowed not to work.

=== Dominican Republic ===
In the Dominican Republic, the Día de los Tres Reyes Magos ('The Day of the Three Royal Magi') and in this day children receive gifts on the christmas tree in a similar fashion to Christmas day. On this day public areas are very active with children accompanied by their parents trying out their new toys.

A common practice is to leave toys under the children's beds on January 5, so when they wake up on January 6, they are made to believe the gifts and toys were left from Santa Claus or the Three Kings. However, and particularly in the larger cities and in the North, local traditions are now being observed and intertwined with the greater North American Santa Claus tradition, as well as with other holidays such as Halloween, due to Americanization via film and television, creating an economy of gifting tradition that spans from Christmas Day until January 6.

=== Egypt ===
The feast of the Epiphany, locally called Eid al-Ghitas (Arabic: عيد الغِطاس), is celebrated by the Coptic Orthodox Church of Alexandria, which falls on 11 Tobe of the Coptic calendar, as the moment when in the baptism of Jesus the skies opened and God himself revealed to all as father of Jesus and all mankind. It is then a moment of revelation of epiphany. This celebration started to include all the processes of incarnation of Jesus, from his birth on Christmas until his baptism in the river Jordan. For the Coptic Orthodox Church it is also a moment in which the path of Jesus to the Cross begins. Therefore, in many celebrations there are certain similarities with the celebrations of Holy Friday during the time of Easter. Since the Epiphany is one of the seven great feasts of the Coptic Orthodox Church, it is a day of strict fasting, and several religious celebrations are held on this day. The day is related to the blessing of waters that are used all throughout the year in the church celebrations, and it is a privileged day to celebrate baptisms. It is also a day in which many houses are blessed with water. It may take several days for the local priest to bless all the houses of the parishioners that ask for it, and so the blessing of the houses may go into the after-feasts of the Epiphany celebrations. However, it must be done before the beginning of Lent.

=== England ===
In England, the celebration of the night before Epiphany, Epiphany Eve, is known as Twelfth Night (the first night of Christmas is December 25–26, and Twelfth Night is January 5–6), and was a traditional time for mumming and the wassail. The Yule log was left burning until this day, and the charcoal left was kept until the next Christmas to kindle next year's Yule log, as well as to protect the house from fire and lightning. In the past, Epiphany was also a day for playing practical jokes, similar to April Fool's Day. Today in England, Twelfth Night is still as popular a day for plays as when Shakespeare's Twelfth Night was first performed in 1601, and annual celebrations involving the Holly Man are held in London. A traditional dish for Epiphany was Twelfth Cake, a rich, dense, typically English fruitcake. As in Europe, whoever found the baked-in bean was king for a day, but uniquely to English tradition other items were sometimes included in the cake. Whoever found the clove was the villain; the twig, the fool; and the rag, the tart. Anything spicy or hot, like ginger snaps and spiced ale, was considered proper Twelfth Night fare, recalling the costly spices brought by the Wise Men. Another English Epiphany sweetmeat was the traditional jam tart, made appropriate to the occasion by being fashioned in the form of a six-pointed star symbolising the Star of Bethlehem, and thus called Epiphany tart. The discerning English cook sometimes tried to use thirteen different colored jams on the tart on this day for luck, creating a pastry resembling stained glass.

=== Ethiopia and Eritrea ===
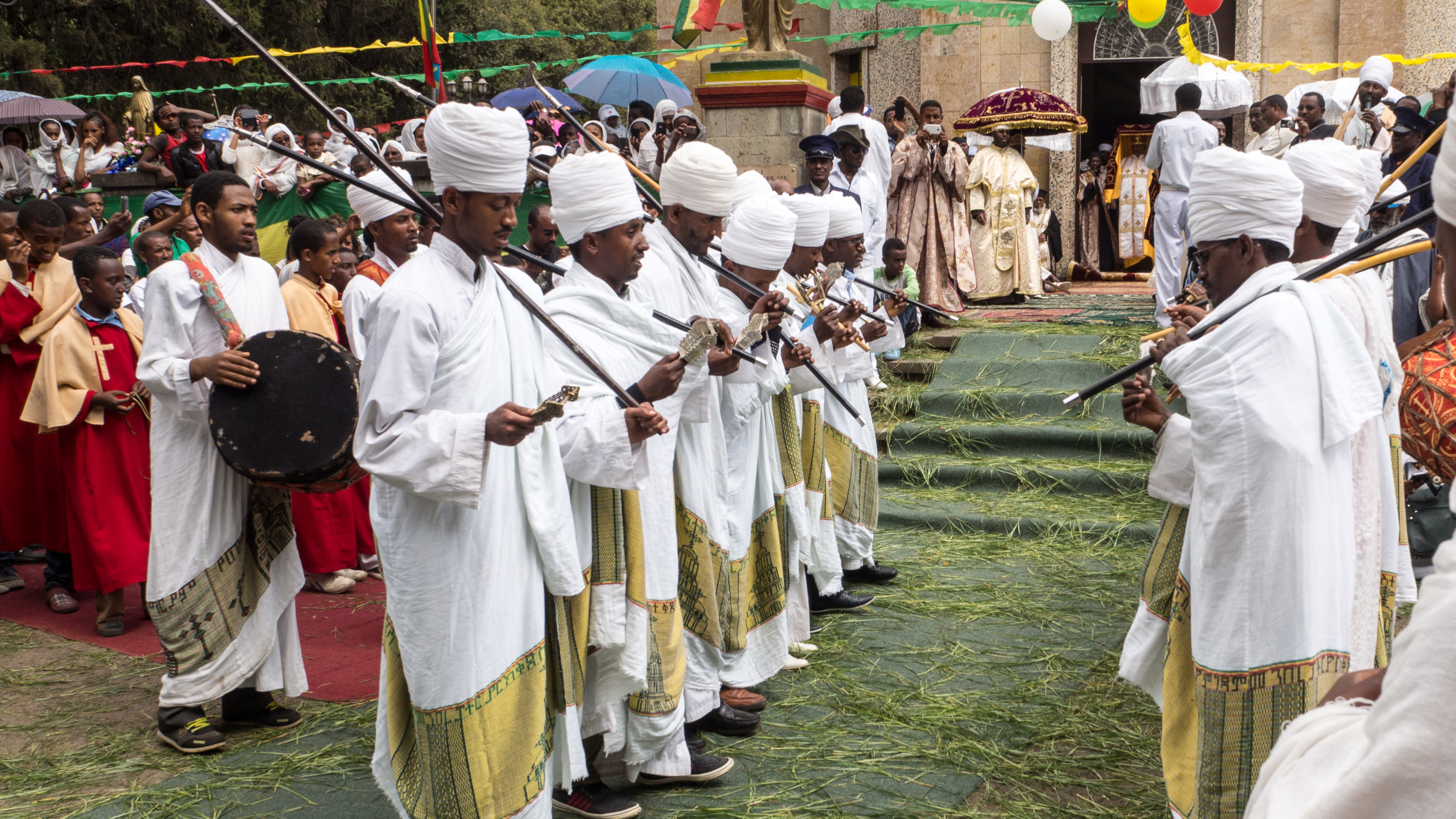
Orthodox priests dancing during the celebration of Timkat

In the Ethiopian Orthodox Church and the Eritrean Orthodox Church, the feast is known as Timkat and is celebrated on the day that the Gregorian calendar calls January 19, but on January 20 in years when New Year in the Ethiopian calendar falls on Gregorian September 12 (i.e. when the following February in the Gregorian calendar will have 29 days). The celebration of this feast features blessing of water and solemn processions with the sacred Tabot.

=== Finland ===
In Finland, Epiphany is called loppiainen, a name which goes back to the 1600s. In the 1500s the Swedish-Finnish Lutheran church called Epiphany "Day of the Holy Three Kings", while before this, the older term Epiphania was used. In the Karelian language Epiphany is called vieristä, meaning cross, from the Orthodox custom of submerging a cross three times to bless water on this day. Today, in the Lutheran church, Epiphany is a day dedicated to a focus on missionary work in addition to the Wise Men narrative. Between 1973 and 1991 Epiphany was observed in Finland on a Saturday each year no earlier than January 6, and no later than January 12. After that time however, the traditional date of January 6 was restored and has since been observed once again as a national public holiday.

The Christmas tree is traditionally taken out of the house on Epiphany. While the term loppiainen means "ending [of Christmas time]," in reality, Christmas celebrations in Finland are extended to Nuutti's or St. Canute's Day on January 13, completing the Scandinavian Twenty Days of Christmas.

=== Francophone Europe ===
In France people share one of two types of king cake. In the northern half of France and Belgium the cake is called a galette des Rois, and is a round, flat, and golden cake made with flake pastry and often filled with frangipane, fruit, or chocolate. In the south, in Provence, and in the south-west, a crown-shaped cake or brioche filled with fruit called a gâteau des Rois is eaten. In Romandie, both types can be found though the latter is more common. Both types of cake contain a charm, usually a porcelain or plastic figurine, called a fève (broad bean in French).

The cake is cut by the youngest (and therefore most innocent) person at the table to assure that the recipient of the bean is random. The person who gets the piece of cake with the trinket becomes "king" or "queen" and wears a paper crown provided with the cake. In some regions this person has a choice between offering a beverage to everyone around the table (usually a sparkling wine or champagne), or volunteering to host the next king cake at their home. This can extend the festivities through all of January.

=== German-speaking Europe ===
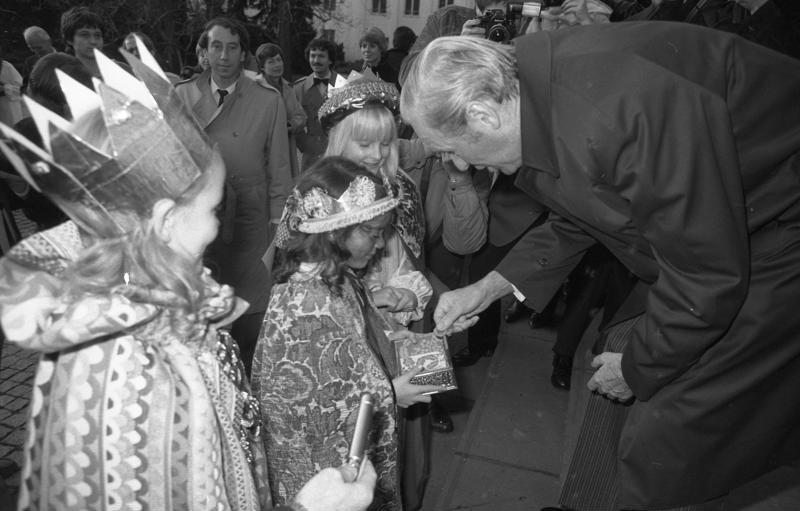
Star singers visit President Karl Carstens (1982)

Traditional house blessing in chalk, written by Sternsinger on the door beam of the home

January 6 is a public holiday in Austria, three states of Germany (Baden-Württemberg, Bavaria and Saxony-Anhalt) and three cantons of Switzerland (Schwyz, Ticino and Uri), as well as in parts of the canton of Graubünden. In the German-speaking lands, groups of young people called Sternsinger (star singers) travel from door to door. They are dressed as the Biblical Magi, and their leader carries a star, usually of painted wood attached to a broom handle. Often these groups are four girls, or two boys and two girls in order to sing in four-part harmony. They sing traditional songs and newer ones such as "Stern über Bethlehem". They are not necessarily three wise men. German Lutherans often note in a lighthearted fashion that the Bible never specifies that the Weisen (Magi) were men, or that there were three. The star singers solicit donations for worthy causes, such as efforts to end hunger in Africa, organized jointly by the Catholic and Protestant churches, and they will also be offered treats at the homes they visit. The young people then perform the traditional house blessing, by marking the year over the doorway with chalk. In Roman Catholic communities this may even today be a serious spiritual event with the priest present, but among Protestants it is more a tradition, and a part of the German notion of Gemütlichkeit. Usually on the Sunday following Epiphany, these donations are brought into churches. Here all of the children who have gone out as star singers, once again in their costumes, form a procession of sometimes dozens of wise men and stars. The German Chancellor and Parliament also receive a visit from the star singers at Epiphany.

The Three Kings cake is a golden pastry ring filled with orange and spice representing gold, frankincense, and myrrh. Most often found in Switzerland, these cakes take the form of Buchteln but for Epiphany, studded with citron, and baked as seven large buns in a round rather than square pan, forming a crown. Or they may be made of typical rich Christmas bread dough with cardamom and pearl sugar in the same seven bun crown shape. These varieties are most typically purchased in supermarkets, with the trinket and gold paper crown included. As in other countries, the person who receives the piece or bun containing the trinket or whole almond becomes the king or queen for a day. Epiphany is also an especially joyful occasion for the young and young at heart, as this is the day dedicated to plündern – that is, when Christmas trees are "plundered" of their cookies and sweets by eager children (and adults) and when gingerbread houses, and any other good things left in the house from Christmas, are devoured. Lastly, there is a German rhyme saying, or Bauernregel, that goes Ist's bis Dreikönigs kein Winter, kommt keiner dahinter, meaning "If there hasn't been any winter (weather) until Epiphany, none is coming afterward." Another of these Bauernregel (German farmer's rules) for Epiphany states: Dreikönigsabend hell und klar, verspricht ein gutes Weinjahr, or "If the eve of Epiphany is bright and clear, it foretells a good wine year."

=== Greece, Cyprus ===
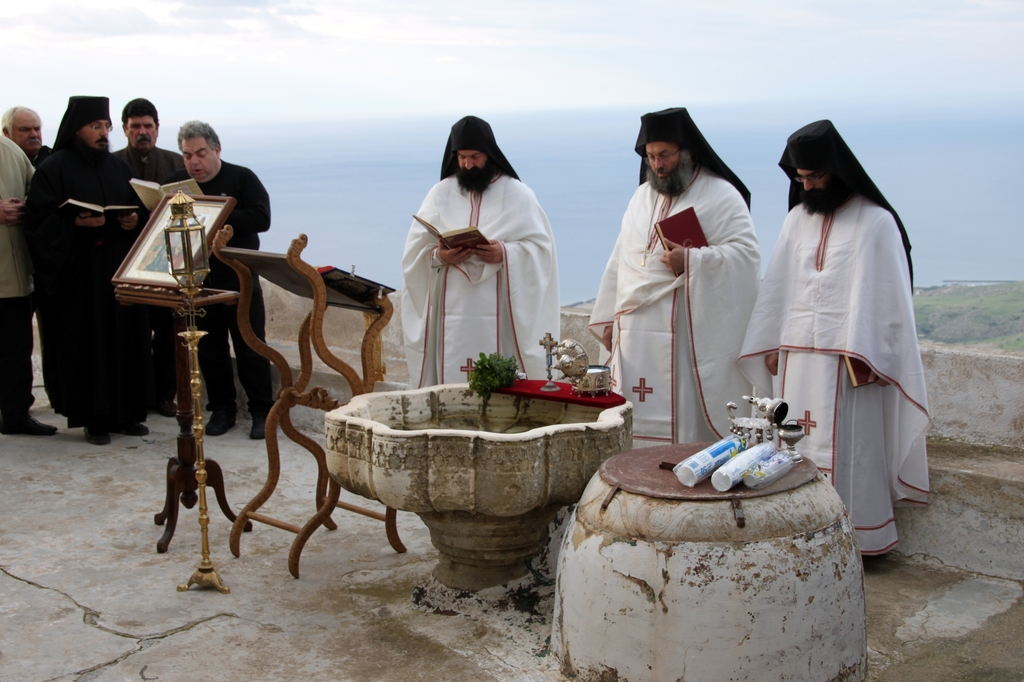
Epiphany Mass in Santorini, Greece

In Greece, Cyprus and the Greek diaspora throughout the world, the feast is called the Theophany, or colloquially Phōta (Greek: Φώτα, 'Lights'). It is the Great Celebration or Theotromi. In some regions of Macedonia (West) it is the biggest festival of the year. The Baptism of Christ symbolizes the rebirth of man, its importance is such that until the fourth century Christians celebrated New Year on this day. Customs revolve around the Great Blessing of the Waters. It marks the end of the traditional ban on sailing, as the tumultuous winter seas are cleansed of the mischief-prone kalikántzaroi, the goblins that try to torment God-fearing Christians through the festive season.

During this ceremony, a cross is thrown into the water, and the men compete to retrieve it for good luck. The Phota form the middle of another festive triduum, together with Epiphany Eve, when children sing the Epiphany carols, and the great feast of St. John the Baptist (January 7 and eve).

It is a time for sanctification, which in Greece means expiation, purification of the people and protection against the influence of demons. This concept is certainly not strictly Christian, but has roots in ancient worship. In most parts of Greece a ritual called small sanctification, Protagiasi or Enlightment is practiced on the eve of Epiphany. The priest goes door to door with the cross and a branch of basil to "sanctify" or "brighten" the rooms by sprinkling them with holy water. The protagiasi casts away the goblins; bonfires are also lit in some places for that purpose.

The 'Great Blessing' is performed on the day of Theophany inside the churches on a special decorated platform upon which a large vessel filled with water is placed. Then the immersion of the Cross takes place in the sea or in a nearby river or lake. The immersion of the Cross, according to popular belief, gives the water purifying and health-giving properties. The inhabitants of many areas, after the immersion, run to the seashores or to the banks of rivers or lakes and wash their agricultural tools and even icons. According to common popular belief, even icons, over time, lose their original power and value, which they, however, regain anew from the blessed water.

This very procedure is nothing but the precisely faithful survival of ancient beliefs. The ancients, for example the Athenians, had the ceremony (procedure) of the well-known 'Plynteria', as they called it, during which they carried in procession to the coast of Phaleron the statue of Athena. There they washed it with seawater to cleanse it of impurities and to renew the sacred powers of the statue.

Today the women of many regions repeat this ancient custom of washing the icons. As in Plaka of Mytilene, at the moment the divers dive to catch the Cross the women at the same time 'take with a kratuna (= water-gourd) water from 40 waves and then, with cotton that they dip in it, clean the icons without speaking throughout this whole process ("silent water") and afterwards they pour the water in a place that is not trodden (into a receptacle of the church)

=== Guadeloupe Islands ===
Celebrations in Guadeloupe have a different feel from elsewhere in the world. Epiphany here does not mean the last day of Christmas celebrations, but rather the first day of Kannaval (Carnival), which lasts until the evening before Ash Wednesday. Carnival, in turn, ends with the grand brilé Vaval, the burning of Vaval, the king of the Kannaval, amidst the cries and wails of the crowd.

=== Hungary ===
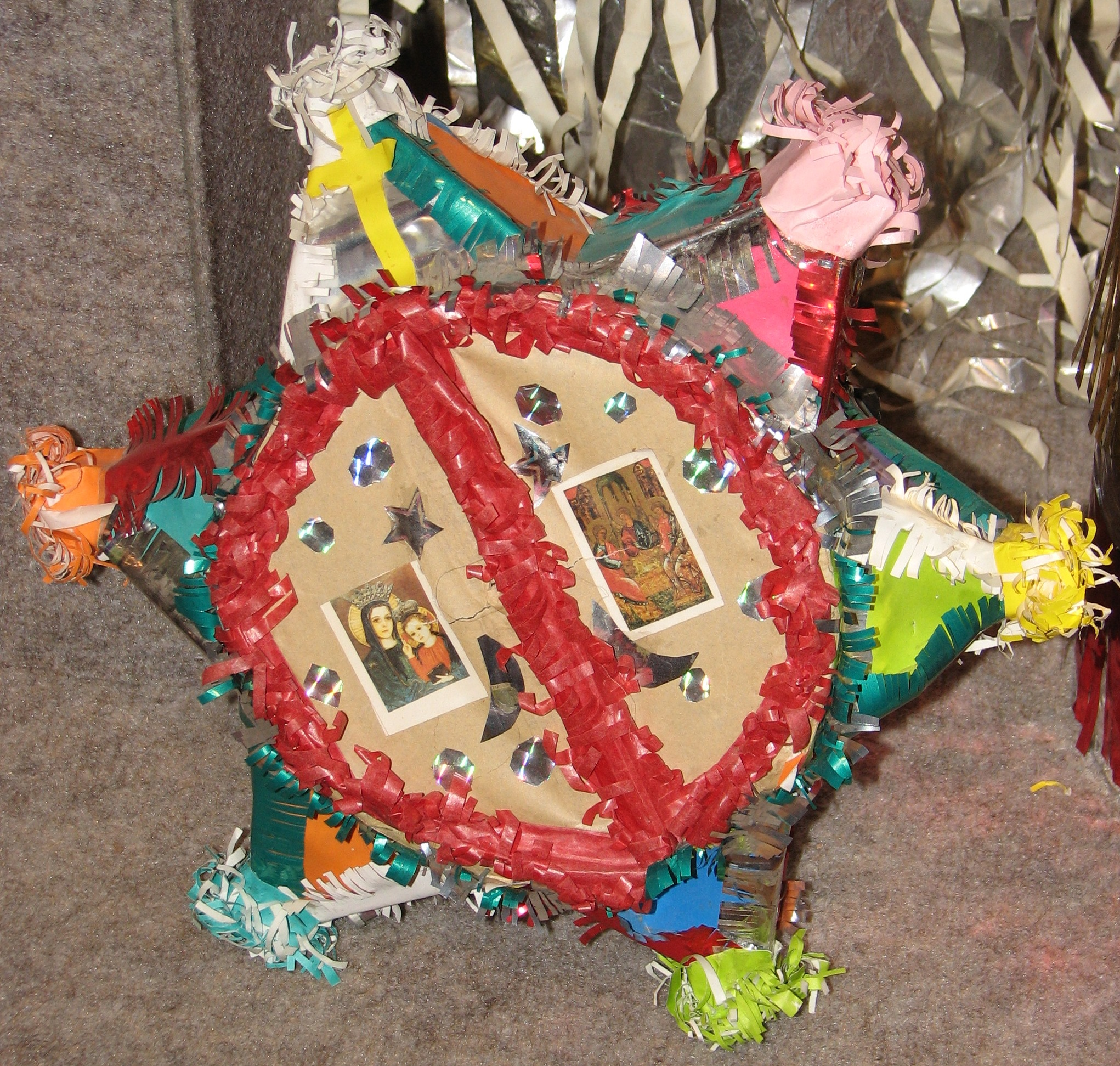
A Christmas star, the main part of a Hungarian Christmas tradition called csillagozás (star-play). Unlike other Christmas traditions the csillagozás is not performed in a group. Usually it is performed by children younger than 10 years. The play itself is a string of Christmas carols that tells the story of Jesus' birth. In the end of the performance the child asks the Lord's blessings for the house and its inhabitants and wishes them merry Christmas. In return the child usually gets some sweets or money.

On this day, the Christmas trees are taken down. Nowadays, the traditions associated with the holiday are being followed in fewer and fewer villages. Many traditions and superstition are associated with this day. During house blessings (called koleda), it was common to write with chalk e.g. 20CMB25 over the door (Christus Mansionem Benedicat in the year 2025, or by popular etymology, CMB stands for Caspar, Melchior, Balthasar (a monogram of the names of the Magi) next to the year to protect them against witch hexes or lightning. The preachers were given a bowl of corn, a bowl of peas, a pig's foot to eat and gifted them a bag of plums, nuts, flour, salo and sausages. With the holy water they blessed their kids, house and animals and their dead (sprinkled on coffins). There were places where people attributed magical powers to simple brooks, like in Jászdózsa, where they cut a hole in the Tarna (today: Trnava) and people splashed each other with the icy water to be healthy. Csillagének (star singing) and Csillagozás were both common. The children doing the Csillagének prepared costumes and mechanically-moved stars, and it wasn't only performed by boys. This was accompanied by Háromkirályjárás where next to the singing they also performed the story of the Biblical Magi and the Story of Herod. As with most Hungarian holidays, there were also superstitions connected to Epiphany (Vízkereszt): for example, in Moara, Romania, it was believed that if you braid that day the sausages will become longer next year.

=== India ===
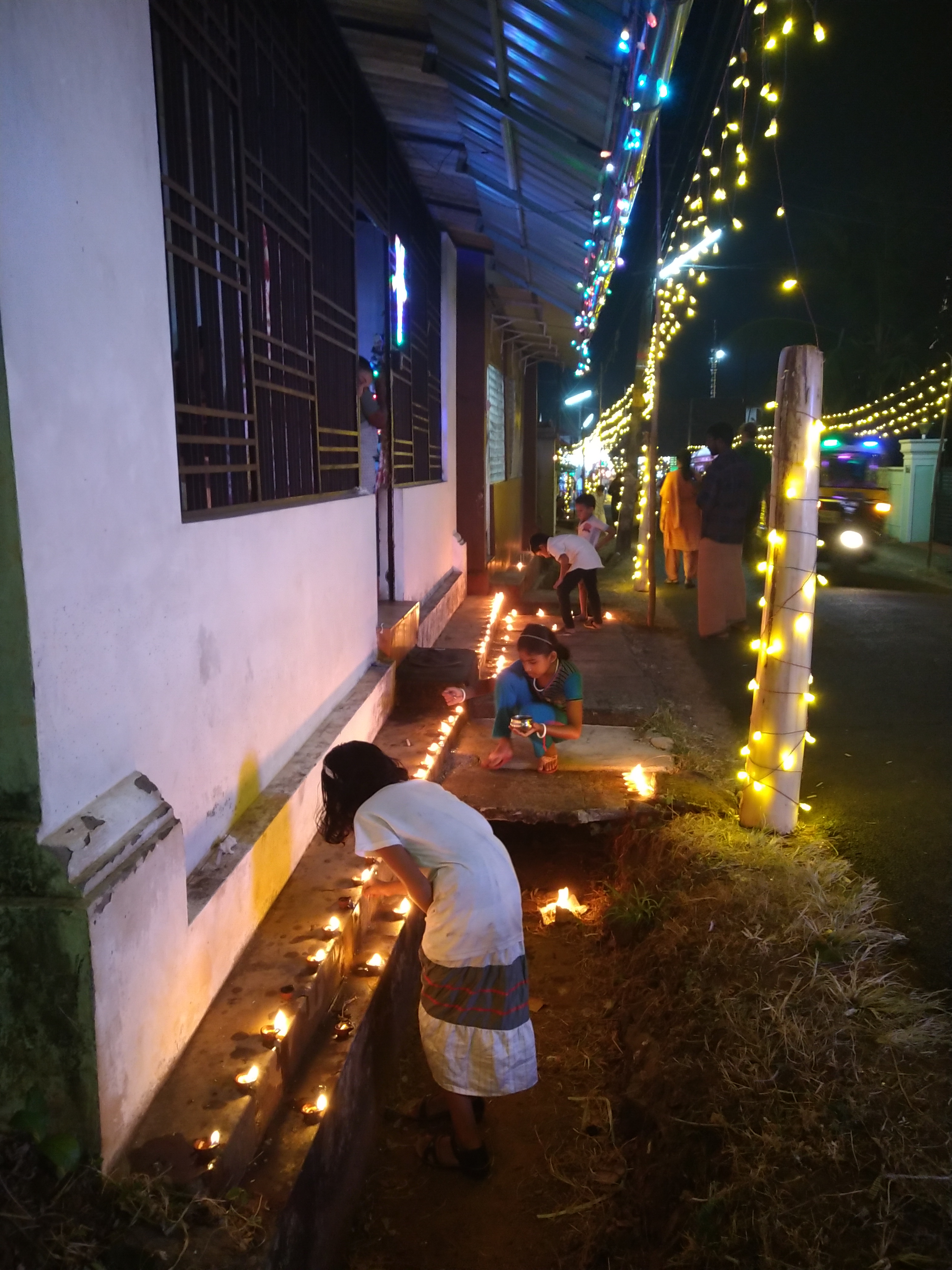
Diyas (lights) are used to celebrate Epiphany in some Kerala Christian households

In parts of southern India, Epiphany is called the Three Kings Festival and is celebrated in front of the local church like a fair. This day marks the close of the Advent and Christmas season and people remove the cribs and nativity sets at home. In Goa Epiphany may be locally known by its Portuguese name Festa dos Reis. In the village of Reis Magos, in Goa, there is a fort called Reis Magos (Wise Men) or Três Reis Magos for Biblical Magi. Celebrations include a widely attended procession, with boys arrayed as the Magi, leading to the Franciscan Chapel of the Magi near the Goan capital of Panjim. Other popular Epiphany processions are held in Chandor. Here three young boys in regal robes and splendid crowns descend the nearby hill of Our Lady of Mercy on horseback towards the main church where a three-hour festival Mass is celebrated. The route before them is decorated with streamers, palm leaves and balloons with the smallest children present lining the way, shouting greetings to the Kings. The Kings are traditionally chosen, one each, from Chandor's three hamlets of Kott, Cavorim and Gurdolim, whose residents helped build the Chandor church in 1645.

In the past the kings were chosen only from among high-caste families, but since 1946 the celebration has been open to all. Participation is still expensive as it involves getting a horse, costumes, and providing a buffet to the community afterwards, in all totaling some 100,000 rupees (about US$2,250) per king. Families consider it worthwhile because having a son serve as a king is considered an honor and a blessing on the family.

The Three Kings Chapel at Cansaulim in South Goa is similarly famous for its Three Kings festival, which draws tourists from around the state and India. Three boys are selected from the three neighboring villages of Quelim, Cansaulim and Arrosim to present the gifts of gold, frankincense and myrrh in a procession. Only a native of these villages may serve as king; outsiders are barred from the role. Throughout the year, excitement runs high in the villages to see who will be chosen. The boys selected are meticulously groomed, and must grow their hair long in time for the festival. The procession involves the three kings wearing jeweled red velvet robes and crowns, riding white horses decked with flowers and fine cloth, and they are shaded by colorful parasols, with a retinue of hundreds.

The procession ends at the local church built in 1581, and in its central window a large white star hangs, and colored banners stream out across the square from those around it. Inside, the church will have been decorated with garlands. After presenting their gifts and reverencing the altar and Nativity scene, the kings take special seats of honor and assist at the High Mass.

To the St. Thomas Christians of Kerala, Epiphany is known by its Syriac name Denha. St. Thomas Christians, like other Eastern Christians, celebrate Denha as a great feast to commemorate the Baptism of Jesus in the river Jordan. The liturgical season Denhakalam ('Weeks of Epiphany') commemorates the second revelation at the Baptism and the subsequent public life of Jesus. Denha is celebrated on January 6 by the Syro-Malabar Church in two ways – Pindiperunnal ('Plantain trunk feast') and Rakkuliperunal ('Feast with a night bath').

=== Ireland ===
The Irish call the day the Feast of the Epiphany or traditionally Little Christmas or "Women's Christmas" (Irish: Nollaig na mBan). On Nollaig na mBan, women traditionally rested and celebrated for themselves after the cooking and work of the Christmas holidays. The custom was for women to gather on this day for a special meal, but on the occasion of Epiphany accompanied by wine, to honor the Miracle at the Wedding at Cana.

Today, women may dine at a restaurant or gather in a pub in the evening. They may also receive gifts from children, grandchildren or other family members on this day. Other Epiphany customs, which symbolize the end of the Christmas season, are popular in Ireland, such as the burning the sprigs of Christmas holly in the fireplace which have been used as decorations during the past twelve days. In Ireland, certain traditions celebrate Epiphany to conclude the Twelfth Night of Christmas, and Christmas decorations should not be removed before this day.

The Epiphany celebration serves as the initial setting for – and anchors the action, theme, and climax of – James Joyce's short story "The Dead" in his 1914 collection Dubliners.

=== Italy ===
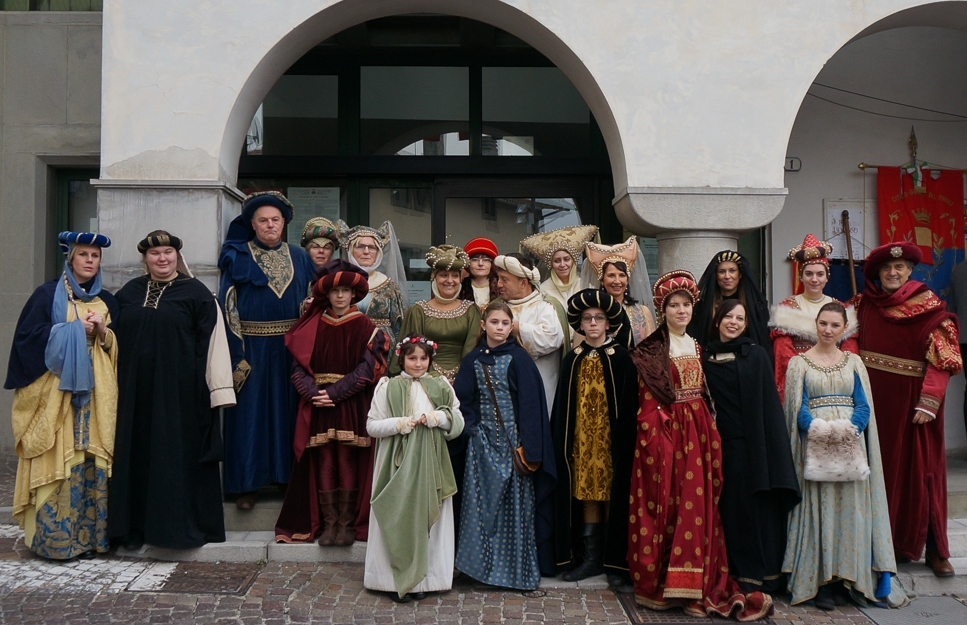
Epiphany celebration in Gemona del Friuli, Friuli-Venezia Giulia, Italy

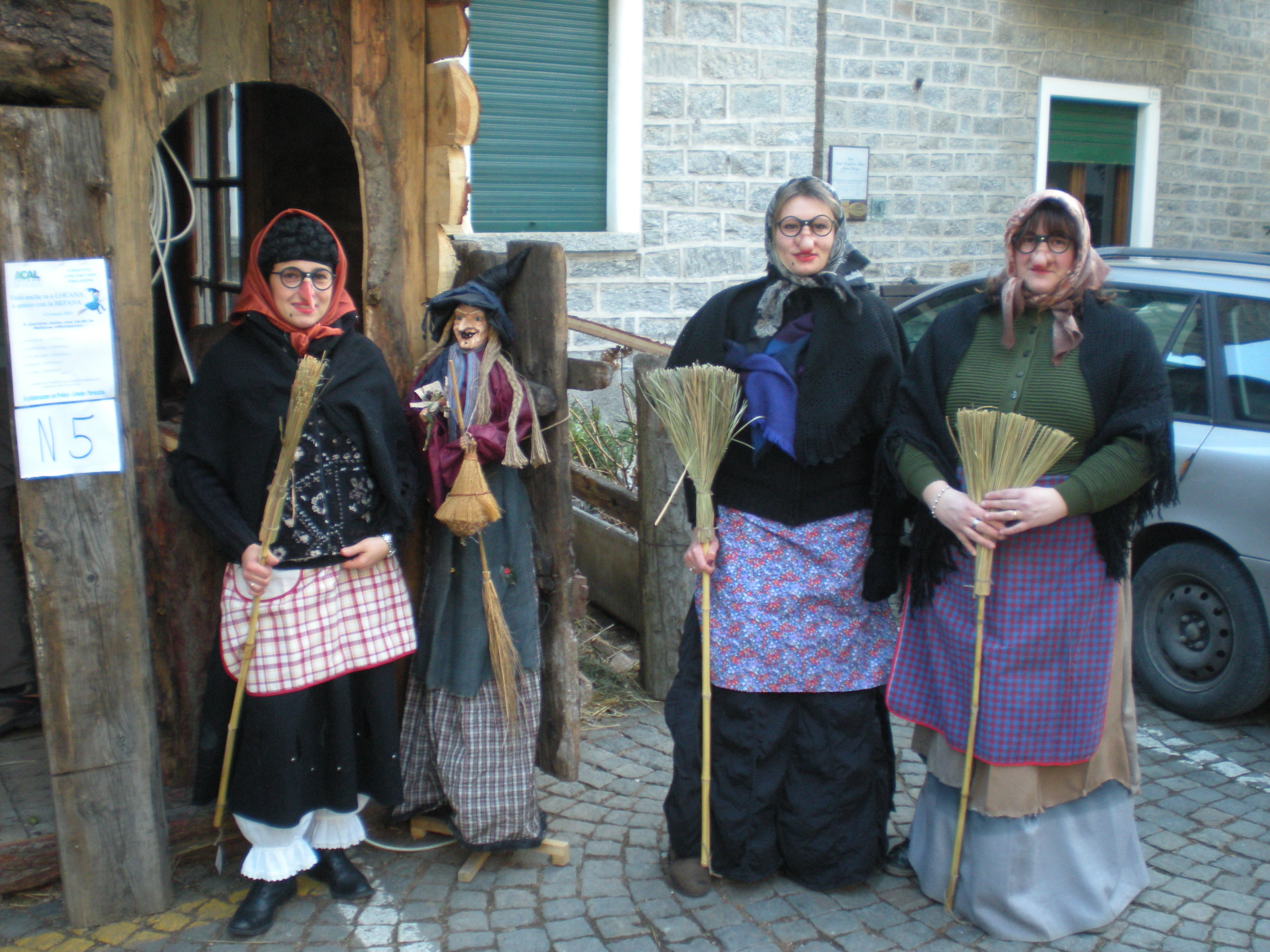
Befana feast in Locana, Piedmont, Italy

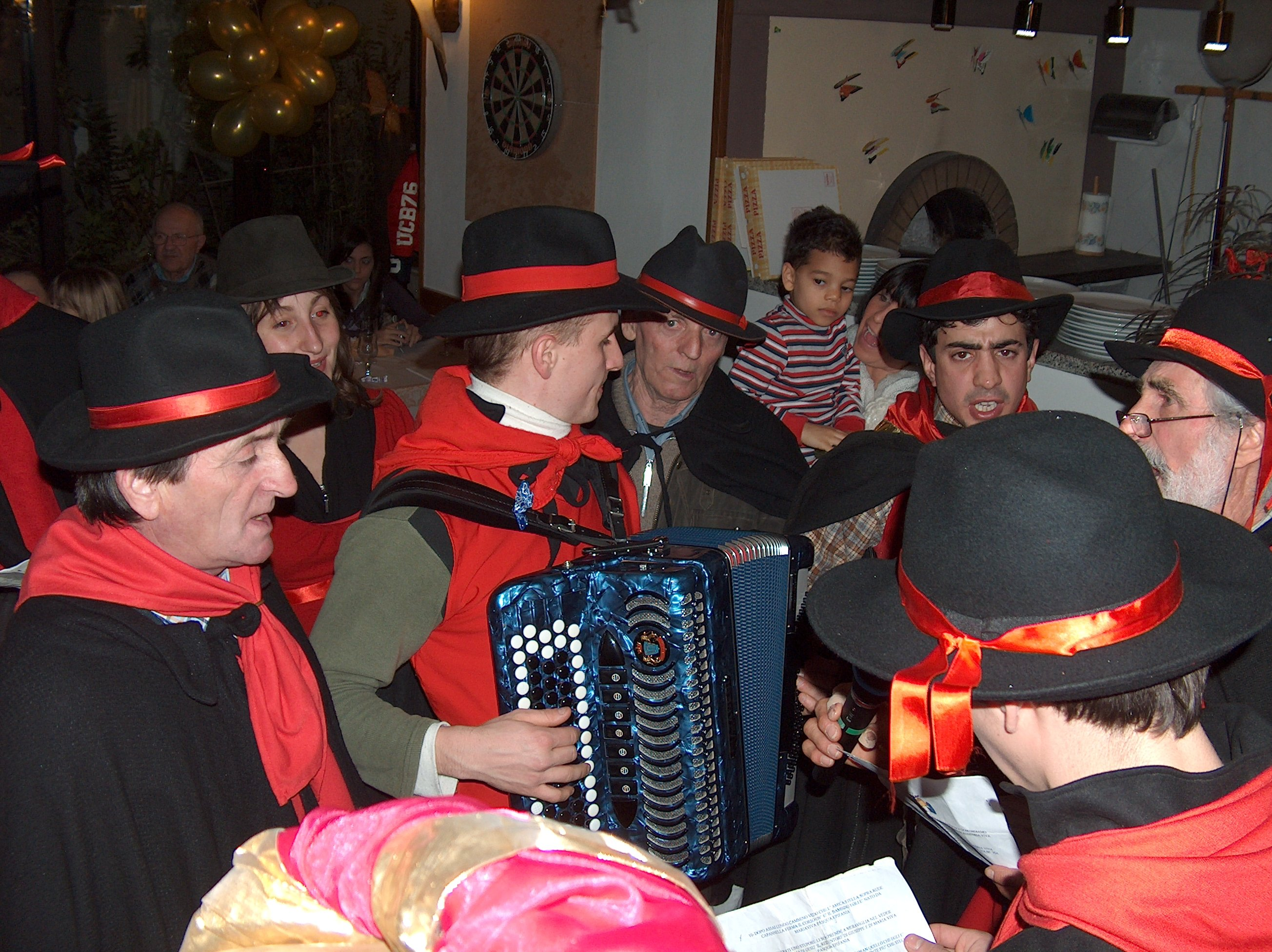
Befana feast in Santa Sofia, Emilia–Romagna, Italy

Christmas in Italy is one of the country's major holidays and begins on 8 December, with the Feast of the Immaculate Conception, the day on which traditionally the Christmas tree is mounted and ends on 6 January, of the following year with the Epiphany.

In Italian folklore and folk customs, the Befana (the name being a corruption of the word Epifania) is a witch-like old woman who delivers gifts to children throughout Italy on Epiphany Eve (the night of January 5) in a similar way to Santa Claus or the Three Magi. The Befana is a widespread tradition among Italians and thus has many names. She is a part of both popular national culture and traditional folk culture and is akin to other figures who roam about sometime during the Twelve Days and reward the good, punish the bad, and receive offerings. The Befana is a mysterious, contradictory figure of unclear origins. The legend told of her is that, having missed her opportunity to bring a gift to the child Jesus together with the Biblical Magi, she now brings gifts to other children on that night.

This character is enhanced by the fact that she is overall neglected by scholars but is the subject of much speculation by the ones who do mention her. Pre-Christian, Christian, and syncretism of the two have all been postulated as explanations of her origins. In some parts of Italy, especially the central regions, mumming takes place on Epiphany eve. Dolls are made of her and effigies are burnt and bonfires are often lit. She brings gifts to good children, typically sweets, candies or toys, but coal to bad children. She is usually portrayed as a hag riding a broomstick through the air wearing a black shawl and is covered in soot because she enters the children's houses through the chimney. She is often smiling and carries a bag or hamper filled with candy, gifts, or both. She is not only loved but also feared and mocked, particularly by children.

Written records of the Befana and Befanata date to the Middle Ages. Her origins are the subject of speculation by scholars who have variously proposed they lie in paganism, Christianity, or a mix of the two. John B. Smith said she, like her High German counterpart Perchta, is nothing more than the personification of Epiphany invented by medieval Christians who had a tendency to personify feast and fast days while Jacob Grimm found it not credible that two separate cultures would personify a feast day as a supernatural figure ("a name in the calendar had caused the invention of a supernatural being") and concluded it was far more likely that the Befana and Perchta were pre-Christian in origin and that they blended with the Christian holiday name. It has been pointed out that there was "a clear attempt to Christianize the disturbing female character by transforming her into the female personification of the feast." Generally the pre-Christian origin is the one most proposed and the Befana is often said to be a goddess or the remnant of one, though what culture and time period she comes from has been less uniform. Cultures that have been proposed include Roman, Celtic, Neolithic farmers, and Paleolithic hunter-gatherers.

However, in some parts of today's Italian state, different traditions exist, and instead of the Befana it is the three Magi who bring gifts. in Sardinia, for example, where local traditions and customs of the Hispanic period coexist, the tradition of the Biblical Magi (in Sardinian language, Sa Pasca de is Tres Reis) bringing gifts to children is very present.

=== Jordan ===
Baptism Site "Bethany Beyond the Jordan" (Al-Maghtas)
UNESCO World Heritage Site
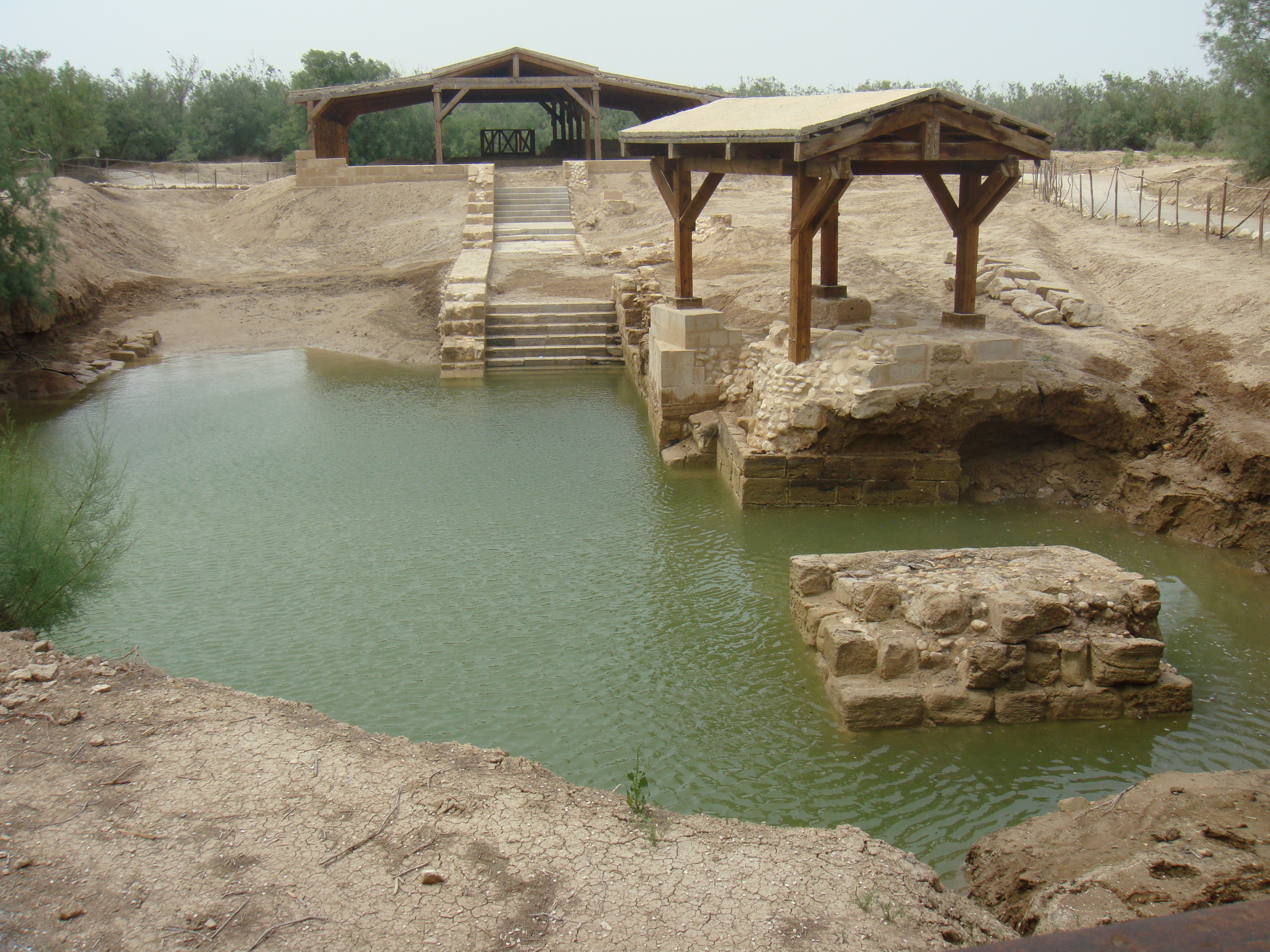
- Al-Maghtas ruins on the Jordanian side of the Jordan River, believed to be the location where Jesus of Nazareth was baptised by John the Baptist
- Location: Balqa Governorate, Jordan
- Reference: 1446
- Inscription: 2015 (39th Session)
- Website: www.baptismsite.com

Thousands of Jordanian Christians, tourists and pilgrims flock to Al-Maghtas site on the east bank of the Jordan River in January every year to mark Epiphany, where large masses and celebrations are held. "Al-Maghtas", meaning "baptism" or "immersion" in Arabic, is an archaeological World Heritage site in Jordan, officially known as "Baptism Site "Bethany Beyond the Jordan" (Al-Maghtas)". It is considered to be the original location of the Baptism of Jesus and the ministry of John the Baptist and has been venerated as such since at least the Byzantine period.

John 1:28: These things took place in Bethany beyond the Jordan, where John was baptising.

The site has then seen several archaeological digs, four papal visits and state visits and attracts tourists and pilgrimage activity. Approximately 81,000 people visited the site in 2016, mostly European, American and Arab tourists.

=== Latvia ===
Epiphany is known in Latvia as Trijkungu diena (Three Kings Day) by Catholics or Zvaigznes diena (Star Day) by Lutherans after the custom of star singing, and the Star of Bethlehem which led the Magi to the Christ Child. In the past bright stars of fabric were sewn onto the background of dark colored quilts, representing the night sky. Epiphany was a day of enjoyment, spent in horse-drawn open sleighs, and these quilts would then be taken along to cover the laps of the merry riders. If Epiphany Day was bright and mild and the sun "warmed the horses' backs" it was said that the coming year would bring only peace. If the night before Epiphany saw clear starry skies, it meant Latvia could expect a fine harvest in the coming Summer. Weaving and wood-cutting were "bad luck", giving both men and women a proper holiday, and if a dog was heard barking on Epiphany one ought to look for his or her future spouse in that same direction. Special three-corner apple cakes are eaten on this day, and as in other countries, star singing, visiting and house blessings have long been popular.

=== Lebanon ===
Epiphany, celebrated on January 6, is the feast for the Roman Church that commemorates the visit of the Wise Men, the magi. However, in the Maronite Church, in accordance with the ancient tradition, it represents the public announcement of Jesus' mission when he was baptized in the Jordan by John the Forerunner, also known as "John the Baptist". On the occasion, Lebanese Christians pray for their deceased.

It is celebrated by attending church most often to the midnight mass by the maronites. The reason why it is at midnight is because the Christ will be passing to bless homes, also Lebanese Christians who gathered for the mass congratulate each other on that day by saying: "El Deyim Deyim" (Arabic: دايم دايم) which translates as "The permanent is permanent". They also mix dough made out of water and flour only and it rises outdoors with no yeast by being blessed.

=== Lithuania ===
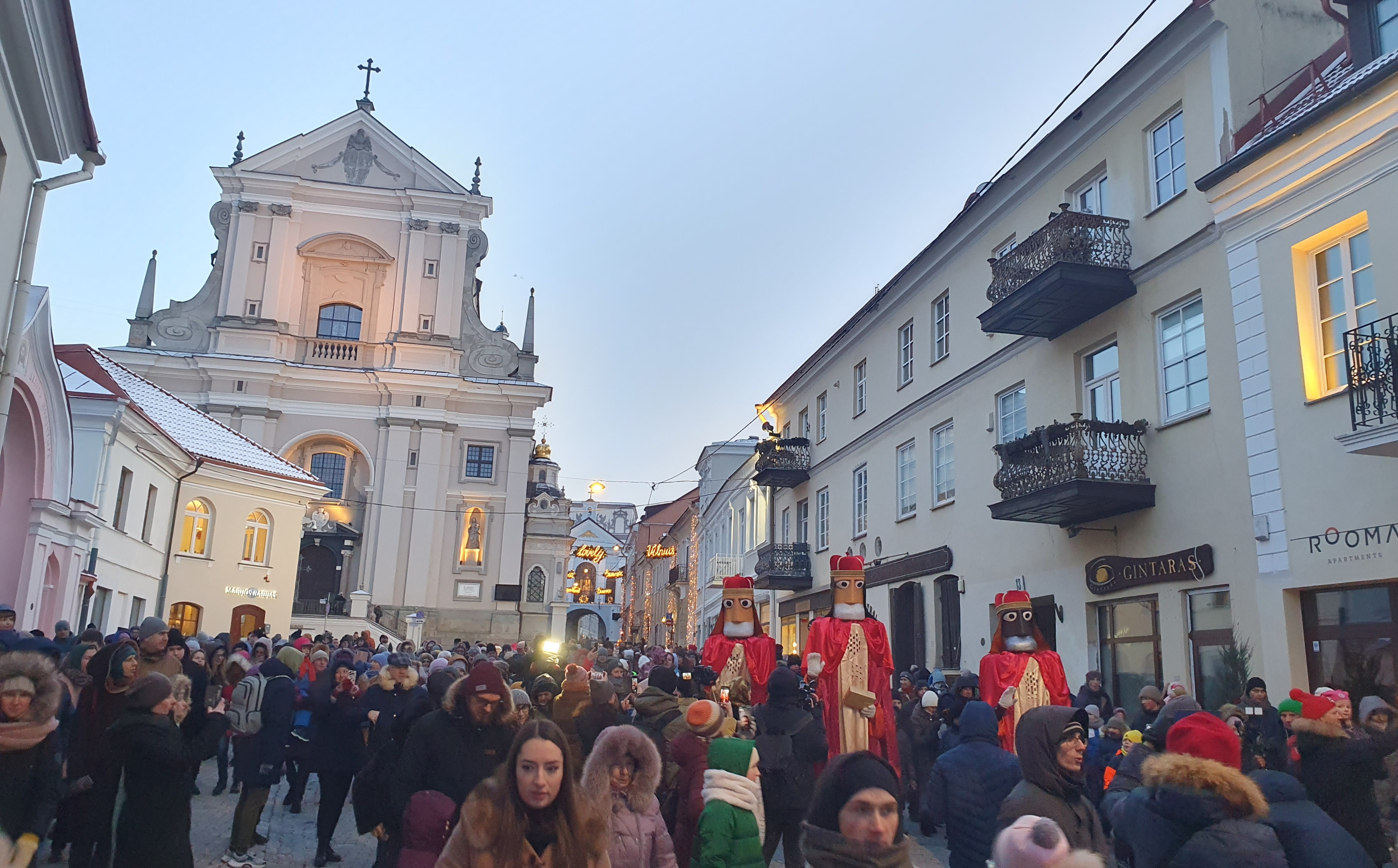
Epiphany (Three Kings' Day) procession near the Church of St. Theresa and Gate of Dawn in the capital of Lithuania Vilnius

Epiphany is known in Lithuania as Trijų karalių diena (Three Kings' Day), earlier it was also called Kūčelėmis. Since the 16th century there is a tradition in Lithuania to mark with chalk (which was consecrated in church on Epiphany) houses and flats doors with three crosses and letters +K+M+B (each letter symbolize first initials of Caspar, Melchior, and Balthasar) and it is believed that it protects the property from evil ghosts. In the 19th–20th centuries the Lithuanian villages houses were marked with chalk by three people who dressed up as Three Kings and travelled through the villages, were congratulating with the Epiphany Day, collecting gifts and gifting their gifts to children, while houses residents were treating the Three Kings with food. Moreover, Lithuanians on the Epiphany Day historically avoided hard work and spinning. The Three Kings processions are also organized annually in Lithuanian cities (e.g. capital Vilnius, Kaunas, Šiauliai, etc.) and special masses are held in Lithuanian churches.

=== North Macedonia ===
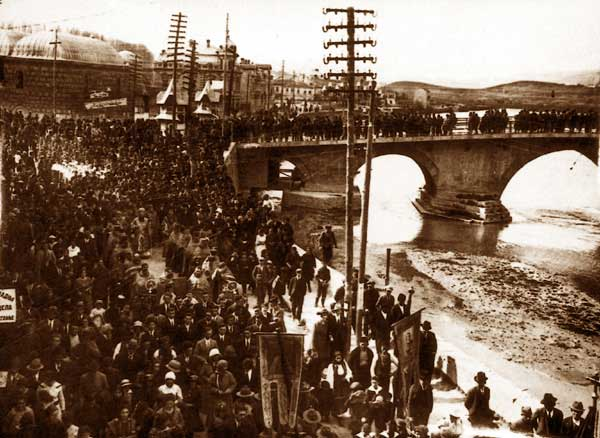
Epiphany procession in the capital of North Macedonia Skopje near Stone Bridge on the Vardar river in the early 1920s

Epiphany in North Macedonia is known as Vodici (Водици). On this day the priest throws a wooden cross into the water, to symbolize the baptism of Christ. Men jump into the cold water to retrieve the cross, and whoever retrieves it is believed to be blessed during the whole year. These are very festive gatherings with many spectacles attending the sites. Special food jelly from pork and beef meat and bones called "pacha" (пача) or "pivtii" (пивтии) is prepared the day before, but served on the day after Epiphany, together with warm local brandy, rakija (ракија). Epiphany is a non-working day for the Orthodox believers in North Macedonia.

=== Malta ===
In Malta, Epiphany is commonly known as It-Tre Re (The Three Kings). Until the 1980s, January 6 was a public holiday, but today the Maltese celebrate Epiphany on the first Sunday of the year. Children and students still take January 6 as a school holiday and Christmas decorations are lit up through this day on most public streets. The Maltese also have a long-standing custom of presenting concerts in honor of Epiphany, including the prestigious annual Epiphany Concert organized by the Malta Council for Culture and Arts, performed by the National Orchestra. In 2010, the Epiphany Concert which used to be held before a select audience, was opened to the general public following a decision by the President. The Ministry of Education and Culture therefore moved from the venue from the Palace to the historic Sacra Infermeria, also known as the Mediterranean Conference Centre. Qagħaq tal-Għasel or tal-Qastanija (Maltese honey rings) are typically served at Epiphany in Malta.

=== Mexico ===
The evening of January 5 marks the Twelfth Night of Christmas and is when the figurines of the three Biblical Magi are added to the nativity scene. Traditionally in Mexico, as with many other Latin American countries, Santa Claus does not hold the cachet that he does in the United States. Rather, it is the Magi who are the bearers of gifts, who leave presents in or near the shoes of small children. Mexican families also commemorate the date by eating Rosca de reyes. In modern Mexico however, and particularly in the larger cities and in the North, local traditions are now being observed and intertwined with the greater North American Santa Claus tradition, as well as with other holidays such as Halloween, due to Americanization via film and television, creating an economy of gifting tradition that spans from Christmas Day until January 6.

=== Peru ===
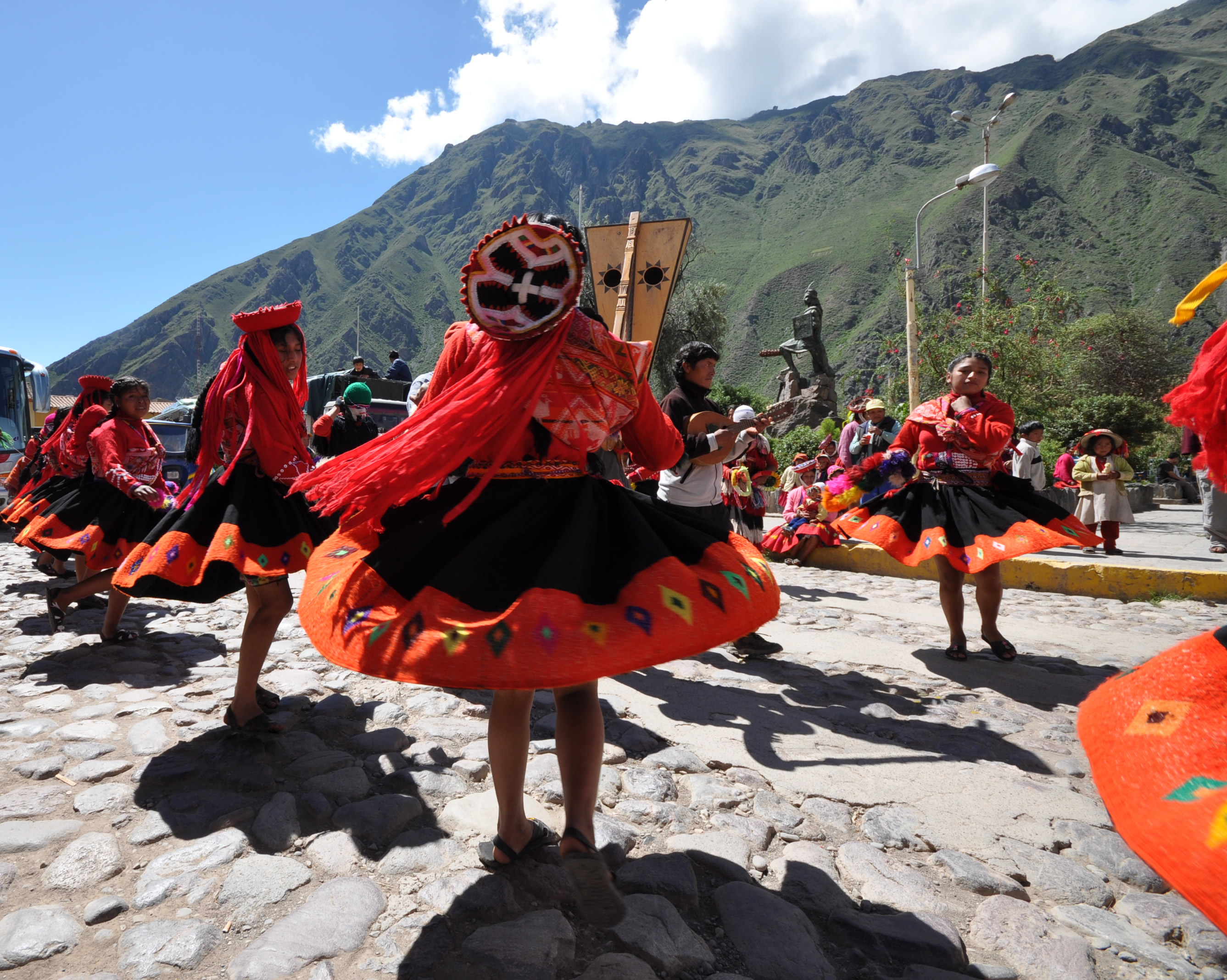
Feast of Día de Reyes in Peru

Peru shares Epiphany customs with Spain and the rest of Latin America. Peruvian national lore holds that Francisco Pizarro was the first to call Lima "Ciudad de los Reyes" (City of the Kings) because the date of the Epiphany coincided with the day he and his two companions searched for, and found, an ideal location for a new capital. Even more popular in Peru than gift giving is the custom of the Bajada de Reyes when parties are held in honor of the taking down of family and public nativity scenes, and carefully putting them away until the next Christmas.

=== Philippines ===
In the Philippines, Epiphany is known as "Three Kings' Day" and Pasko ng Matatanda ("Feast of the Elderly"), and marks the official close of the country's Christmas season. As a day of feasting, some Filipinos celebrate with gift-giving and greet each other "Happy Three Kings!".

=== Poland ===
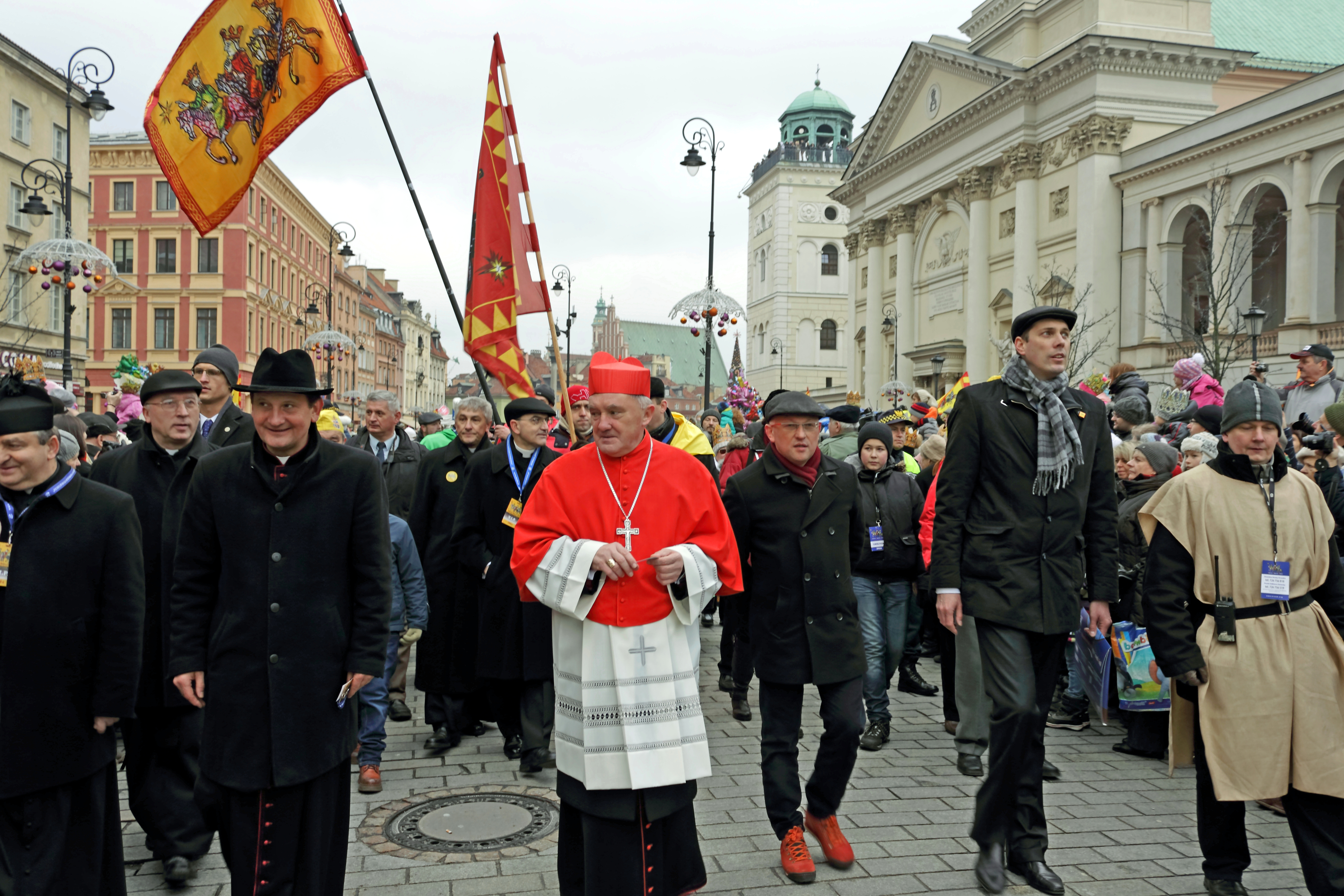
Epiphany celebration in Warsaw, Poland

In Poland, Epiphany, or Trzech Króli (Three Kings) is celebrated in grand fashion, with huge parades held welcoming the Wise Men, often riding on camels or other animals from the zoo, in Warsaw, Poznań and over 2,000 other cities. The Wise Men pass out sweets, children process in renaissance wear, carols are sung, and living nativity scenes are enacted, all similar to celebrations in Italy or Spain, pointing to the country's Catholic heritage. Children may also dress in colors signifying Europe, Asia, and Africa (the supposed homes of the Wise Men) and at the end of the parade route, church leaders often preach on the spiritual significance of the Epiphany. In 2011, by an act of Parliament, Epiphany was restored as an official non-working national public holiday in Poland for the first time since it was canceled under communism fifty years earlier.

Poles though take small boxes containing chalk, a gold ring, incense and a piece of amber, in memory of the gifts of the Magi, to church to be blessed. Once at home, they "chalk the door" by inscribing "K+M+B+" and the year with blessed chalk above every door in the house to provide, according to tradition, protection against illness and misfortune for those within. The letters, with a cross after each one, are said to stand either for the traditionally applied names of the Three Kings in Polish – Kacper, Melchior and Baltazar – or for a Latin inscription meaning "Christ bless this house." They remain above the doors all year until they are inadvertently dusted off or replaced by new markings the next year. On January 6, as in much of Europe, a Polish style Three Kings cake is served with a coin or almond baked inside. The one who gets it is king or queen for the day, signified by wearing the paper crown that decorates the cake. According to Polish tradition this person will be lucky in the coming year. Recipes vary by region. Some serve a French-type puff pastry cake with almond paste filling, others favor a sponge cake with almond cream filling, and yet others enjoy a light fruitcake.

Epiphany in Poland also signals the beginning of zapusty or carnival time, when pączki (doughnuts) and chrust (Angel wings) are served.

=== Portugal ===
In Portugal, Epiphany, January 6, is called Dia de Reis (Day of the Kings), during which the traditional Bolo Rei (King cake) is baked and eaten. Plays and pageants are popular on this day, and parents often hold parties for their children. Epiphany is also a time when the traditional Portuguese dances known as Mouriscadas and Paulitos are performed. The latter is an elaborate stick dance. The dancers, who are usually men but may be dressed as women, manipulate sticks or staves (in imitation swords) in two opposing lines. It is a tradition too in Portugal for people to gather in small groups and to go from house to house to sing the Reis (meaning "Kings") which are traditional songs about the life of Jesus. The singers also bring greetings to the owners of the house. After singing for a while outside, they are invited in, and the owners of the house offer them sweets, liqueurs, and other Epiphany delicacies. These Reis usually begin on Epiphany eve and last until January 20.

Portuguese village of Vale de Salgueiro encourages children, some as young as five, to smoke in a tradition that does not have clear roots.

=== Romania and Moldova ===
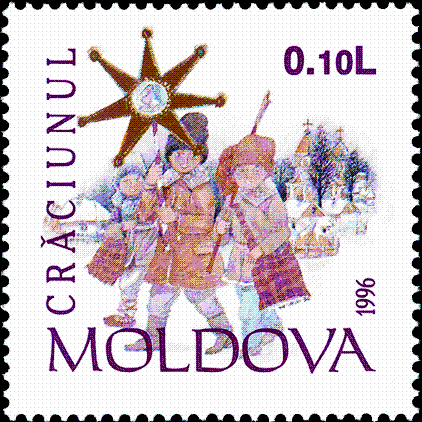
Star boys. Postage stamp depicting traditional Christmas and Epiphany star singing in Moldova.

In Romania and Moldova, Epiphany is called Boboteaza. In south-eastern Romania, following religious services, men participate in winter horse races. Before the race, the men line up with their horses before the priest, who will bless them by sprinkling them with green branches that have been dipped into Epiphany holy water. Sometimes people desire to have this blessing for themselves as well. Winning the Epiphany race is a great honor for both horse and rider, while the post-race celebrations, win or not, are highly festive. As in other Eastern Orthodox heritage countries, water rites play a special role on this day. A unique piece of Romanian folk wisdom holds that if a girl slips on ice – or, better yet, falls into water – on Epiphany, she will surely marry before the year is out.

In Transylvania ("Erdély" in Hungarian and "Siebenbürgen" in German), Lutheran and Reformed Christians of Hungarian and Saxon descent celebrate Epiphany with star singing and house blessing, as in Central Europe. The star singing custom had long ago spread throughout Romania and the Republic of Moldova. Here the star, called Steaua, today resembles a stained-glass lantern and features an Orthodox icon at its center, a tradition pointing to the blending of both East and West which characterizes the two nations on the river Prut.

=== Russia ===
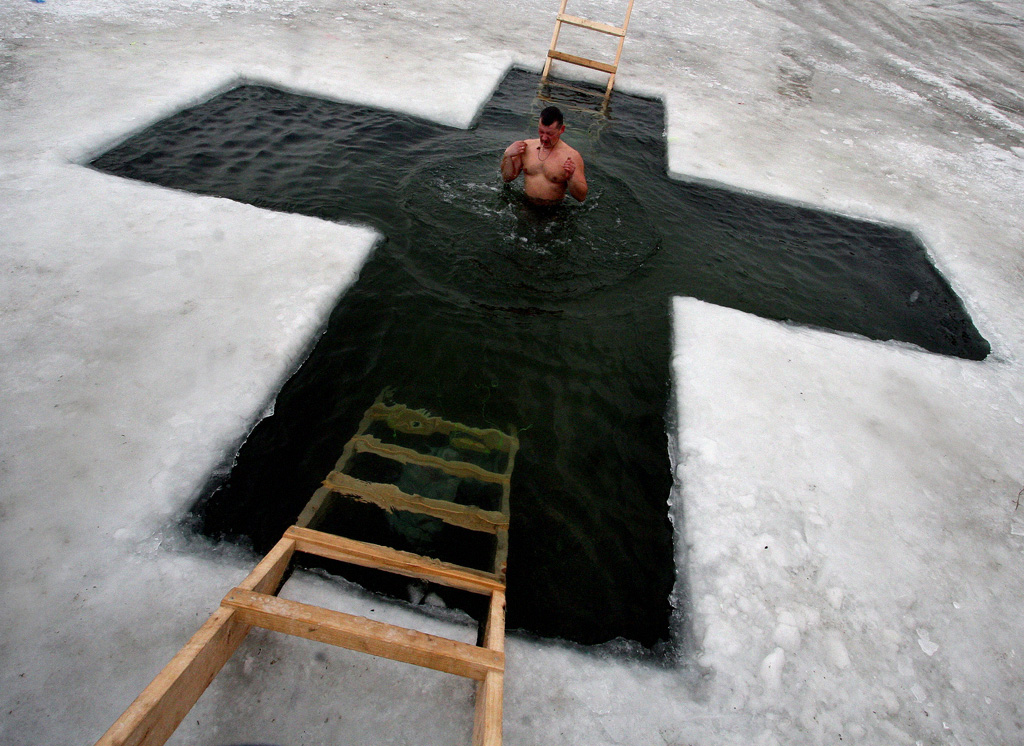
An ice hole is cut in the form of a cross in Russia to celebrate the Epiphany.

The Epiphany, celebrated in Russia on January 19 [O.S. January 6] marks the baptism of Jesus in the Eastern Orthodox Church. As elsewhere in the Orthodox world, the Russian Church conducts the ceremony of the Baptism of the Lord (Russian: Крещение Господне), involving the rite of the Great Blessing of the Waters, also known as "the Great Sanctification of the Water" on that day (or on the eve before). The priest-led procession could simply proceed to the font, but traditionally the worshipers would go to a nearby lake or river.

Historical records indicate that the Blessing of the Waters ceremony took place at the court of the Russian tsar as early as 1525. Historians portray the blessing of the waters procession as the most magnificent of the annual ceremonies at the tsar's court, comparable only to such special events as royal coronations and weddings. After a divine liturgy in the Kremlin's Dormition Cathedral, a procession led by the tsar and patriarch would proceed to the frozen Moskva River. An ice-hole would be cut into the ice, called an iordan' (Russian: иордань, in memory of the Jordan River), over which a small gazebo would have been erected and decorated with holy icons, one of which would depict the baptism of Christ. The patriarch would immerse his cross in the river's water; and sprinkle the tsar, his boyars, and the banners of the tsar's army regiments with holy water. A quantity of holy water would then be brought back to the Kremlin for use in blessing the tsar's palace. A similar ceremony would later take place in the 19th century in the imperial Russian capital of Saint Petersburg. On a smaller scale, similar ceremonies would take place in the parishes throughout the nation.

Believing that on this day water becomes holy and is imbued with special powers, Russians cut holes called iordani (Russian: иордани) in the ice of lakes and rivers, often in the shape of a cross, to bathe in the freezing water. This practice is said to have become popular comparatively recently; it was fairly uncommon in tsarist times, but has flourished since the 1990s.

Participants in the ritual may dip themselves under the water three times, honoring the Holy Trinity, to symbolically wash away their sins from the past year, and to experience a sense of spiritual rebirth. Orthodox priests are on hand to bless the water, and rescuers are on hand to monitor the safety of the swimmers in the ice-cold water. Other attendees limit their participation in the Epiphany rites to those conducted inside churches, where priests perform the Great Blessing of Waters, both on Epiphany Eve and Epiphany (Theophany) proper. The water is then distributed to attendees who may store it to use in times of illness, to bless themselves, family members, and their homes; or to drink. Some Russians think any water – even from the taps of the kitchen sink – poured or bottled on Epiphany becomes holy water, since all the water in the world is blessed this day. In the more mild climate of the southern Russian city of Sochi meanwhile, where air and water temperatures both hover in the low to mid 10-degree Celsius range (50 degrees Fahrenheit) in January, thousands of people jump into the Black Sea at midnight each year on Epiphany and begin to swim in celebration of the feast.

=== Slovenia ===
In Slovenia, especially in the Western part of the country, during the first day of the year and on Epiphany, children go from house to house because villagers will give them almonds, dried figs, nuts, cookies or other good things that they have at home.

=== Spain ===
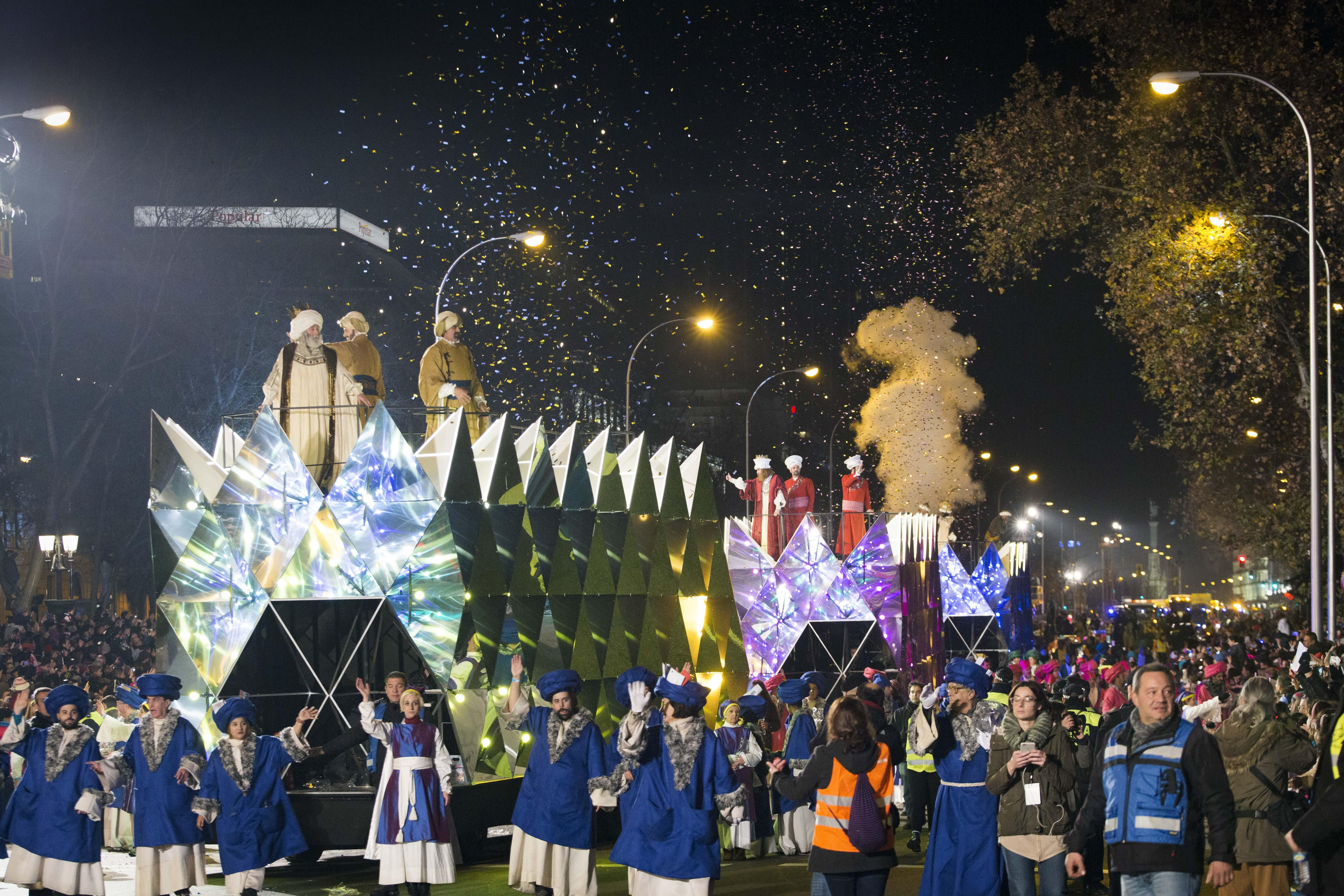
Cavalcade of Magi in Madrid.

In Spain and some Latin American countries, Epiphany day is called El Día de los Reyes Magos i.e., the day when a group of Kings or Magi, as related in the second chapter of the Gospel of Matthew, arrived to worship and bring three gifts to the baby Jesus after following a star in the heavens. In Spanish tradition on January 6, three of the Kings: Melchior, Gaspar, and Balthazar, representing Arabia, the Orient, and Africa, arrived on horse, camel and elephant, bringing respectively gold, frankincense and myrrh to the baby Jesus. Before going to bed on the eve of January 6, children polish their shoes and leave them ready for the Kings' presents to be put in them. The next morning presents will appear under their shoes, or if the children are deemed to have misbehaved during the year, coal (usually a lump of hard sugar candy dyed black, called Carbón Dulce). Most towns in Spain arrange colorful parades representing the arrival of the Reyes Magos to town so children can see them on their camels or carriages and receive sweets and toys thrown to the crowds from the paraders, before they go to bed. The oldest of these parades is held in Alcoy, Alicante (Valencian Community) which has hosted an annual parade since 1885. Sweet wine, nibbles, fruit and milk are left for the Kings and their camels. In Spain, children typically receive presents on this day, rather than on Christmas, though this tradition has changed lately, and children now receive presents on both days. The Epiphany bread/cake is known as Roscón, Tortell de Reis in Catalan, and in Mexico as Rosca de reyes.

=== Sweden ===
Epiphany is a public holiday in Sweden, where it is known as trettondedag jul ("Thirteenth Day Yule"), as January 6 is the thirteenth day after Christmas Eve, the main day on which Christmas is celebrated in Sweden. However, the end of the Christmas celebration is on January 13, St. Knut's Day, more commonly known as "Twentieth Day Yule" (or "Twentieth Day Knut").

=== United States ===
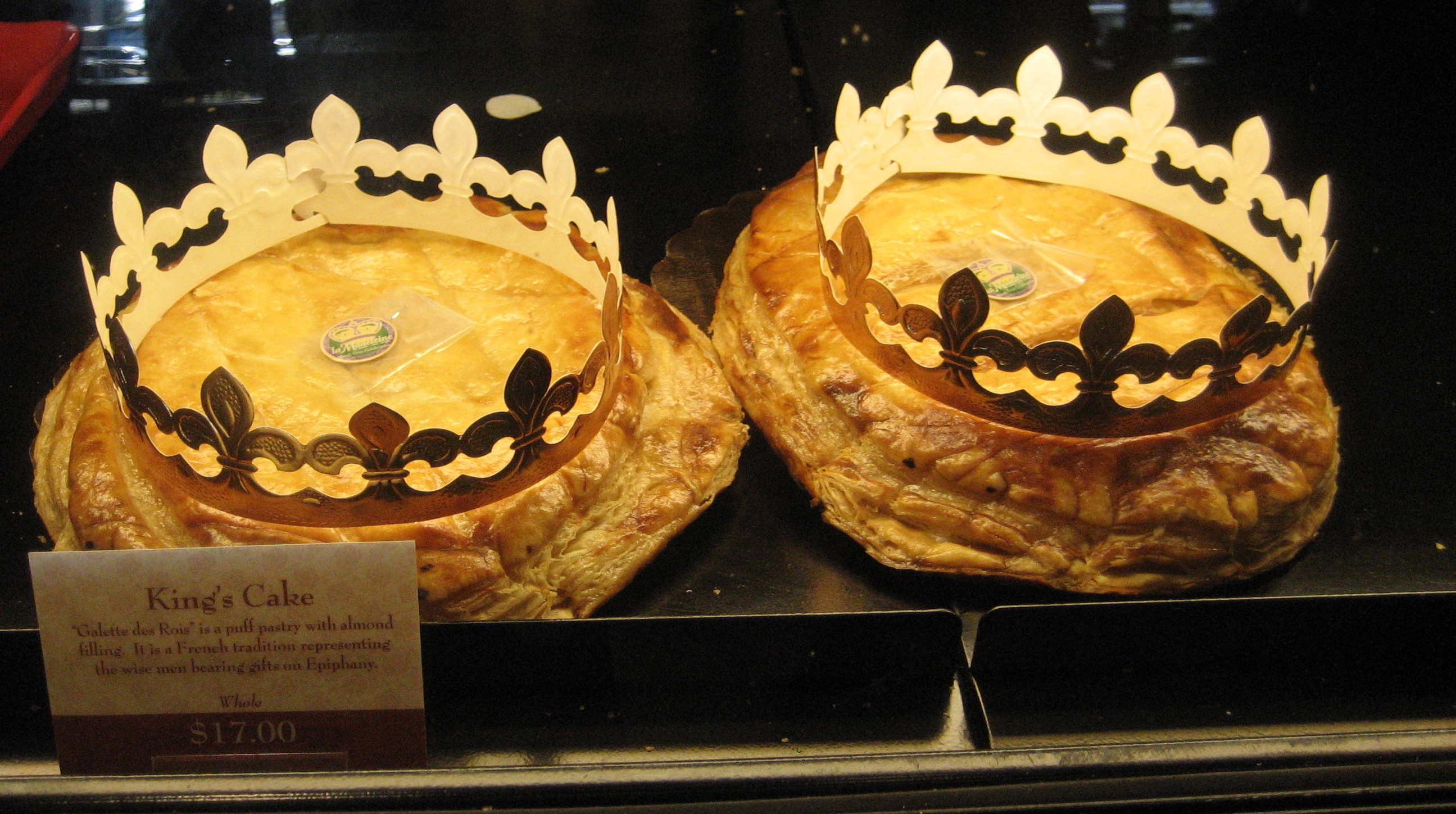
King cakes of the type locally called "French style" on display at the chain bakery/restaurant "La Madeline" branch in Carrollton, New Orleans. They come with cardboard "crowns" to be worn by whoever gets the slice with the token and becomes monarch of the event.

In Louisiana, Epiphany is the beginning of the Carnival season, during which it is customary to bake King Cakes, similar to the Rosca mentioned above. It is round in shape, filled with cinnamon, glazed white, and coated in traditional carnival color sanding sugar. The person who finds the doll (or bean) must provide the next king cake. The interval between Epiphany and Mardi Gras is sometimes known as "king cake season", and many may be consumed during this period. The Carnival season begins on King's Day (Epiphany), and there are many traditions associated with that day in Louisiana and along the Catholic coasts of Mississippi, Alabama, and Florida. King cakes are first sold then, Carnival krewes begin having their balls on that date, and the first New Orleans krewe parades in street cars that night.

In Puerto Rico, Epiphany is an important festive holiday, and is commonly referred as Día de Los Tres Reyes Magos or Three Kings' Day. It is traditional for children to fill a box with fresh grass or hay and put it underneath their bed, for the Wise Men's horses or camels, depending on the household. Sometimes, the grass is cut fresh by the children on January 5. Many artisans make commemorative traditional figures of the Magi on horseback. The Three Wise Men of Puerto Rico, according to local tradition, arrive on horseback instead of camels, as in other countries where the custom is also ingrained. The Three Wise Men will then take the grass to feed the horses and will leave gifts under the bed as a reward. In other households, the grass is "eaten" by the Magi's transport bedside to "strengthen them for the long night's journey", while the presents are delivered by the Magi as they did for child Jesus. These traditions are analogous to the customs of children leaving mince pies and sherry out for Father Christmas in Western Europe or leaving milk and cookies for Santa Claus like the rest of the United States. On the day before the feast (January 5), the "Rosario de Reyes" or "Promesa de Reyes" is celebrated with songs (locally called "aguinaldos") thanking or asking the Kings for their blessing, usually before a little table with figures of the Nativity and the Kings or with the Kings alone and their camels or horses. However, recently public concerts have also become popular. This celebration is often accompanied with a chicken soup ("asopa'o"), snacks, and drinks.

In Colonial Virginia, Epiphany, or 12th Night, was an occasion of great merriment, and was considered especially appropriate as a date for balls and dancing, as well as for weddings. On 12th Night, Great Cake was prepared, consisting in two giant layers of fruitcake, coated and filled with royal icing. Custom dictated that the youngest child present cut and serve the cake and whoever found the bean or prize in the Twelfth Night cake was crowned "King of the Bean" similar to the European king cake custom.

In Erie, Pennsylvania, as part of an Epiphany party a king is hidden in a cake, and whichever child finds the king in the cake is crowned king for the day.

Tarpon Springs, Florida, is known for elaborate religious ceremonies related to the Greek Orthodox Church, the most notable being the Epiphany celebration. The Metropolitan of Atlanta usually presides over the blessings, sometimes joined by the Archbishop of America. The blessings conclude with the ceremonial throwing of a wooden cross into the city's Spring Bayou, and boys ages 16 to 18 diving in to retrieve it. Whoever recovers the cross is said to be blessed for a full year. Following the blessings, the celebration moves to the Sponge Docks where food and music are made part of the festivities. Tarpon Springs has given itself the nickname Epiphany City. The celebration attracts Greek Americans from across the country, and the city's population is known to triple in size for that day.

In Manitou Springs, Colorado, Epiphany is marked by the Great Fruitcake Toss. Fruitcakes are thrown, participants dress as kings, fools, etc., and competitions are held for the farthest throw, the most creative projectile device, etc. As with customs in other countries, the fruitcake toss is a sort of festive symbolic leave-taking of the Christmas holidays until next year, but with humorous twist, since fruitcake is considered with a certain degree of derision in most of the United States, and is the source of many jokes.

=== Wales ===
On January 6, the Feast of the Epiphany has long been an important celebration in Wales, known there as Ystwyll. In Glamorganshire, a huge loaf or cake was prepared, which was then divided up into three parts to represent Christ, the Virgin Mary and the Biblical Magi. A large company of neighbours was invited to be present at the dividing of the cake in which rings were concealed. Whoever discovered a ring in his piece of cake (or bread) was elected as King or Queen and presided over the day's festivities. January 6 was the old-calendar Christmas Day and many of the festivities connected with it lasted well over a century after the new calendar was introduced in 1752.

Wales shares other Twelfth Night customs with its neighbor, England, including the Yule log, and the wassail to wish farmers a good harvest in the coming year, but here the Yule log's ashes were saved then buried along with the seeds planted in the ensuing spring to ensure a good harvest, while the wassail bowl was taken to the house of newlyweds or to a family which had recently come to live in the district and songs sung outside the house door. Those inside the house would recite or sing special verses, to be answered by the revelers outside.

Another Welsh custom associated with Epiphany was the Hunting of the Wren. A group of young men would go out into the countryside to capture a wren (the smallest bird in the British Isles after the goldcrest/firecrest). The bird would then be placed in a small, decorated cage and carried around from house to house and shown in exchange for money or gifts of food and drink. (If a wren could not be found then a sparrow would have to undergo the ritual.)
