= Christmas =

Christian holiday usually on December 25

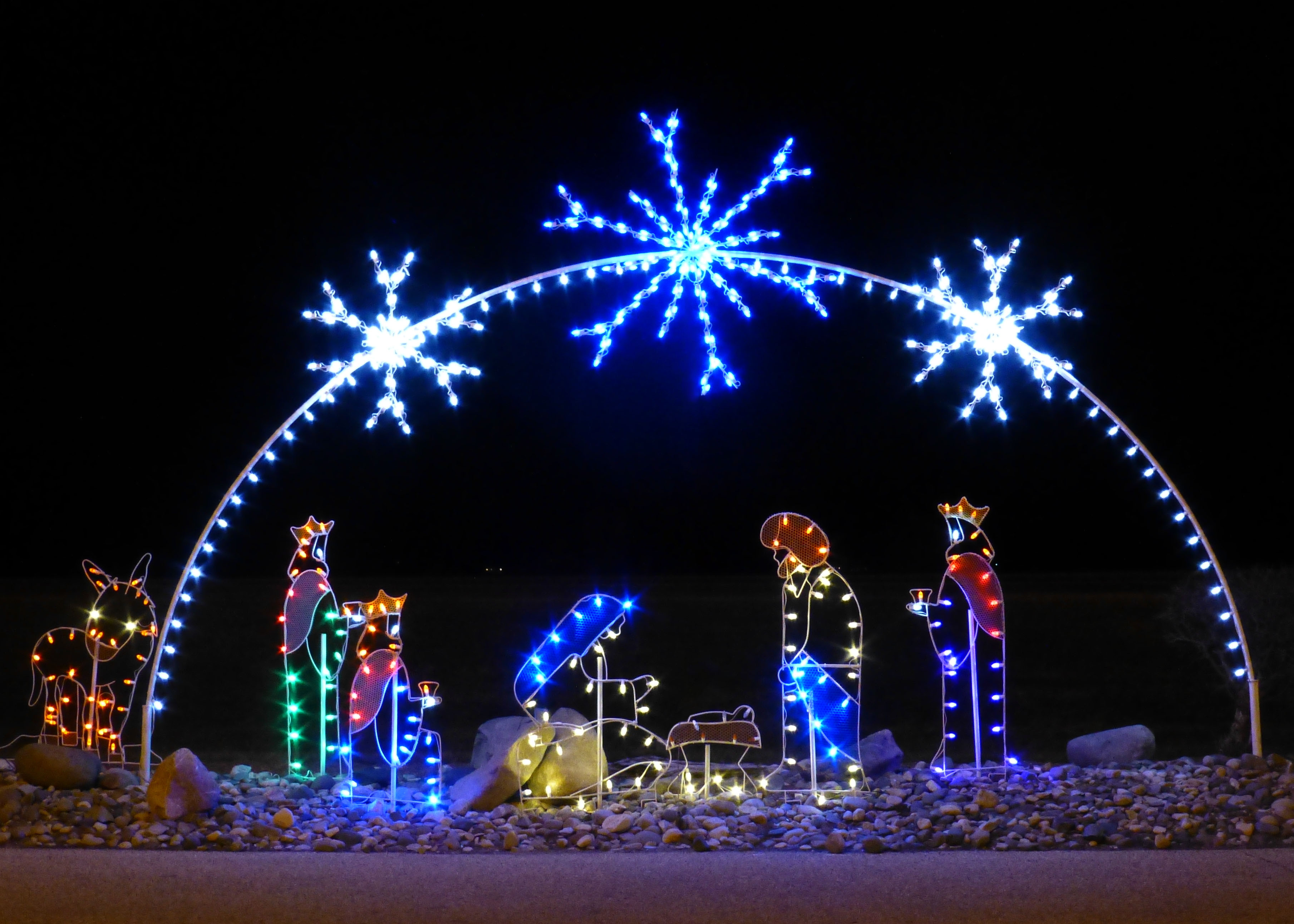
- Nativity scene depicted using Christmas lights
- Also called: Noël, Nativity, Xmas, Yule, Koleda, Boro Din, Genna
- Observed by: Christians, Alawites, many others
- Type: Christian, cultural, international
- Significance: Commemoration of the nativity of Jesus
- Celebrations: Gift-giving, family and other social gatherings, symbolic decoration, music and entertainment, feasting
- Observances: Church services
- Date: December 25; Western Christianity and part of the Eastern churches; January 6; Armenian Apostolic Church and the Armenian Evangelical Church; January 7 (O.S. December 25); Most Oriental Orthodox and part of the Eastern Orthodox churches; January 19 (O.S. January 6); Armenian Patriarchate of Jerusalem
- Related to: Christmastide, Christmas Eve, Advent, Annunciation, Epiphany, Baptism of the Lord, Nativity Fast, Nativity of Christ, Old Christmas, Yule, Saint Stephen's Day, Boxing Day, Candlemas

Christmas is a religious and cultural celebration commemorating the birth of Jesus Christ, observed primarily on December 25 (Note: Several branches of Eastern Christianity that use the Julian calendar also celebrate on December 25 according to that calendar, which is now January 7 on the Gregorian calendar. Armenian Churches observed the nativity on January 6 even before the Gregorian calendar originated. Most Armenian Christians use the Gregorian calendar, still celebrating Christmas Day on January 6. Some Armenian churches use the Julian calendar, thus celebrating Christmas Day on January 19 on the Gregorian calendar, with January 18 being Christmas Eve. Some regions also celebrate primarily on December 24, rather than December 25.) among billions of people around the world. A liturgical feast central to Christianity, Christmas preparation begins on the First Sunday of Advent. Advent is followed by Christmastide, which historically in the West lasts twelve days and culminates on Twelfth Night. Christmas Day is a public holiday in many countries and is observed by a majority of Christians; it is also celebrated culturally by many non-Christians and forms an integral part of the annual festive holiday season.

The traditional Christmas narrative recounted in the New Testament, known as the Nativity of Jesus, says that Jesus was born in Bethlehem, in accordance with messianic prophecies. When Joseph and Mary arrived in the city, the inn had no room, and so they were offered a stable where the Christ Child was soon born, with angels proclaiming this news to shepherds, who then spread the word.

There are different hypotheses regarding the date of the birth of Jesus. In the early fourth century, the church fixed the date as December 25, the date of the winter solstice in the Roman Empire. It is nine months after Annunciation on March 25, also the Roman date of the spring equinox. Most Christians celebrate on December 25 in the Gregorian calendar, which has been adopted almost universally in the civil calendars used in countries throughout the world. However, part of the Eastern Christian churches celebrate Christmas on December 25 of the older Julian calendar, which currently corresponds to January 7 in the Gregorian calendar. Most major Christian denominations do not hold December 25 to be the definitive historical date of Jesus' birth, but nonetheless celebrate it on this date as tradition as well as it being the earliest attested date.

The customs associated with Christmas in various countries have a mix of pre-Christian, Christian, and secular themes and origins. Popular holiday traditions include gift-giving; completing an Advent calendar or Advent wreath; Christmas music and carolling; watching Christmas films; viewing a Nativity play; an exchange of Christmas cards; attending church services; a special meal; and displaying various Christmas decorations, including Christmas trees, Christmas lights, nativity scenes, poinsettias, garlands, wreaths, mistletoe, and holly. Additionally, several related and often interchangeable figures, known as Santa Claus, Father Christmas, Saint Nicholas, and Christkind, are associated with bringing gifts to children during the Christmas season and have their own body of traditions and lore. Because gift-giving and many other aspects of the Christmas festival involve heightened economic activity, Christmas has become a significant event and a key sales period for retailers and businesses. Over the past few centuries, Christmas has had a steadily growing economic effect in many regions of the world.

== Etymology ==
The English word Christmas is a shortened form of 'Christ's Mass'. The word is recorded as Crīstesmæsse in 1038 and Cristes-messe in 1131. Crīst (genitive Crīstes) is from the Koine Greek Χριστός (Khrīstos, 'Christ'), a translation of the Hebrew מָשִׁיחַ (Māšîaḥ, 'Messiah'), meaning 'anointed'; and mæsse is from the Latin missa, the celebration of the Eucharist.

The form Christenmas was also used during some periods, but is now considered archaic. The term derives from Middle English Cristenmasse. Xmas is an abbreviation of Christmas, particularly in print, based on the initial letter chi (Χ) in the Greek Χριστός (Christ), although some style guides discourage its use. This abbreviation has a precedent in Middle English Χρ̄es masse (where Χρ̄ is another abbreviation of the Greek word).

=== Other names ===
The Anglo-Saxons referred to Christmas as midwinter. The period corresponding to December and January was called Gēola ('Yule'), and this term was eventually equated with Christmastide; Old English Ġeōhel-dæg ('Yule Day') was sometimes used as a name for Christmas Day. Yule or Yuil survived as the main name for Christmastide in Scotland until the modern era.

A rare name for Christmas in Old English was Nātiuiteð ('Nativity'), from the Latin nātīvitās meaning 'birth'. 'Noel' (also 'Nowel' or 'Nowell', as in "The First Nowell") entered English in the late 14th century and is from the Old French noël or naël, itself ultimately from the Latin nātālis (diēs) meaning 'birth (day)'.

Koleda is the traditional Slavic name for Christmas and the period from Christmas to Epiphany or, more generally, to Slavic Christmastide rituals, some dating to pre-Christian times.

During the late Qing dynasty, the Shanghai News referred to Christmas by a variety of terms. In 1872, it initially called Christmas "Jesus' birthday" (Chinese: 耶穌誕日; pinyin: yēsū dànrì). However, from 1873 to 1881, the Qing dynasty used terms such as "Western countries' Winter Solstice" (Chinese: 西國冬至; pinyin: xīguó dōngzhì) and "Western peoples' Winter Solstice" (Chinese: 西人冬節; pinyin: xīrén dōngjiē); they settled on "Foreign Winter Solstice" (Chinese: 外國冬至; pinyin: wàiguó dōngzhì) in 1882. This term was gradually replaced by the now standard term "Festival of the birth of the Holy One" (Chinese: 聖誕節; pinyin: shèngdàn jiē) during the early twentieth century.

== Nativity ==
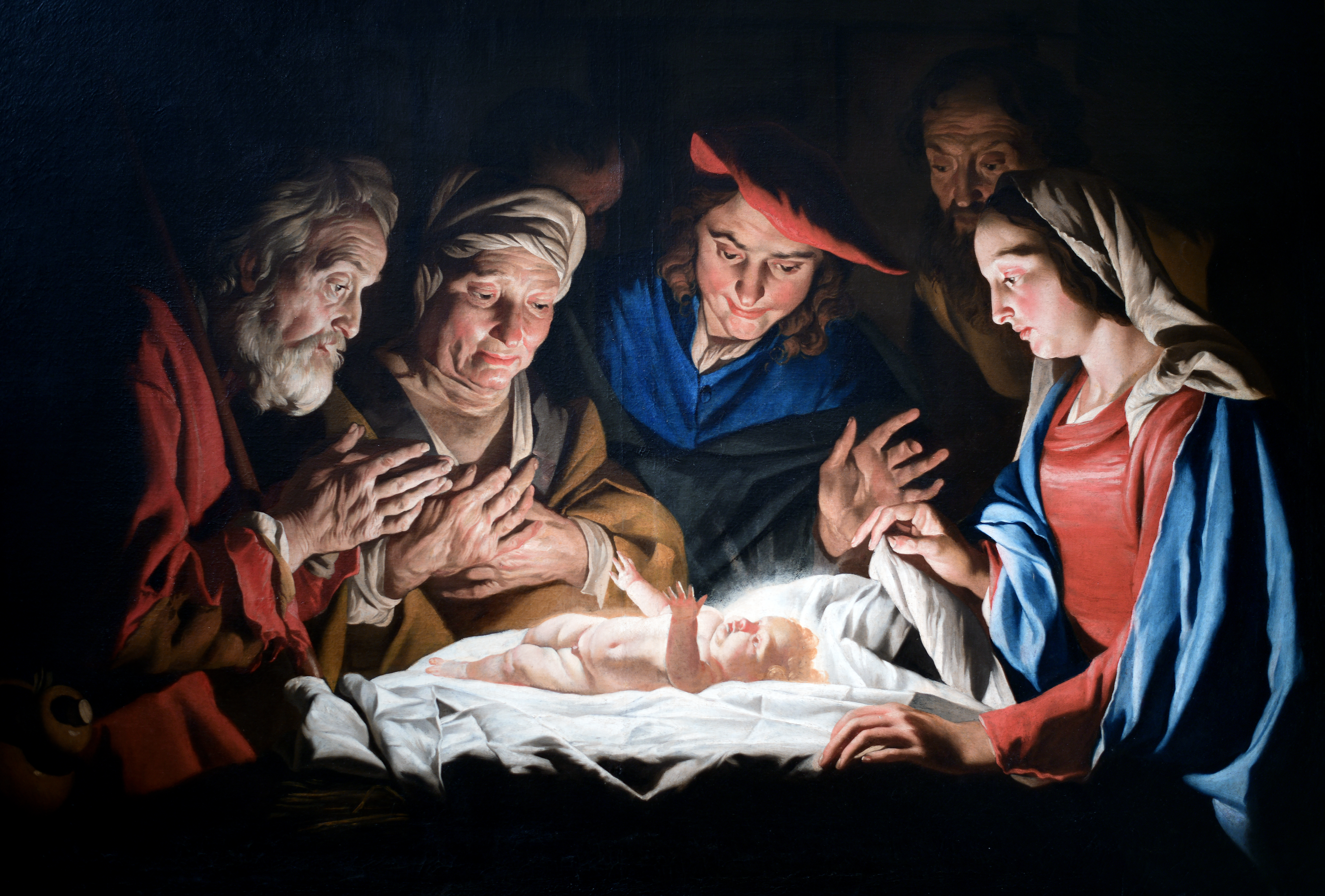
Adoration of the Shepherds by Dutch painter Matthias Stomer, 1632

The gospels of Luke and Matthew describe Jesus as being born in Bethlehem of Judea to the Virgin Mary. In the Gospel of Luke, Joseph and Mary travel from Nazareth to Bethlehem in order to be counted for a census, and Jesus is born there and placed in a manger. Angels proclaim him a savior for all people, and three shepherds come to adore him. In the Gospel of Matthew, by contrast, three magi follow a star to Bethlehem to bring gifts to Jesus.

== History ==
=== Early and medieval era ===
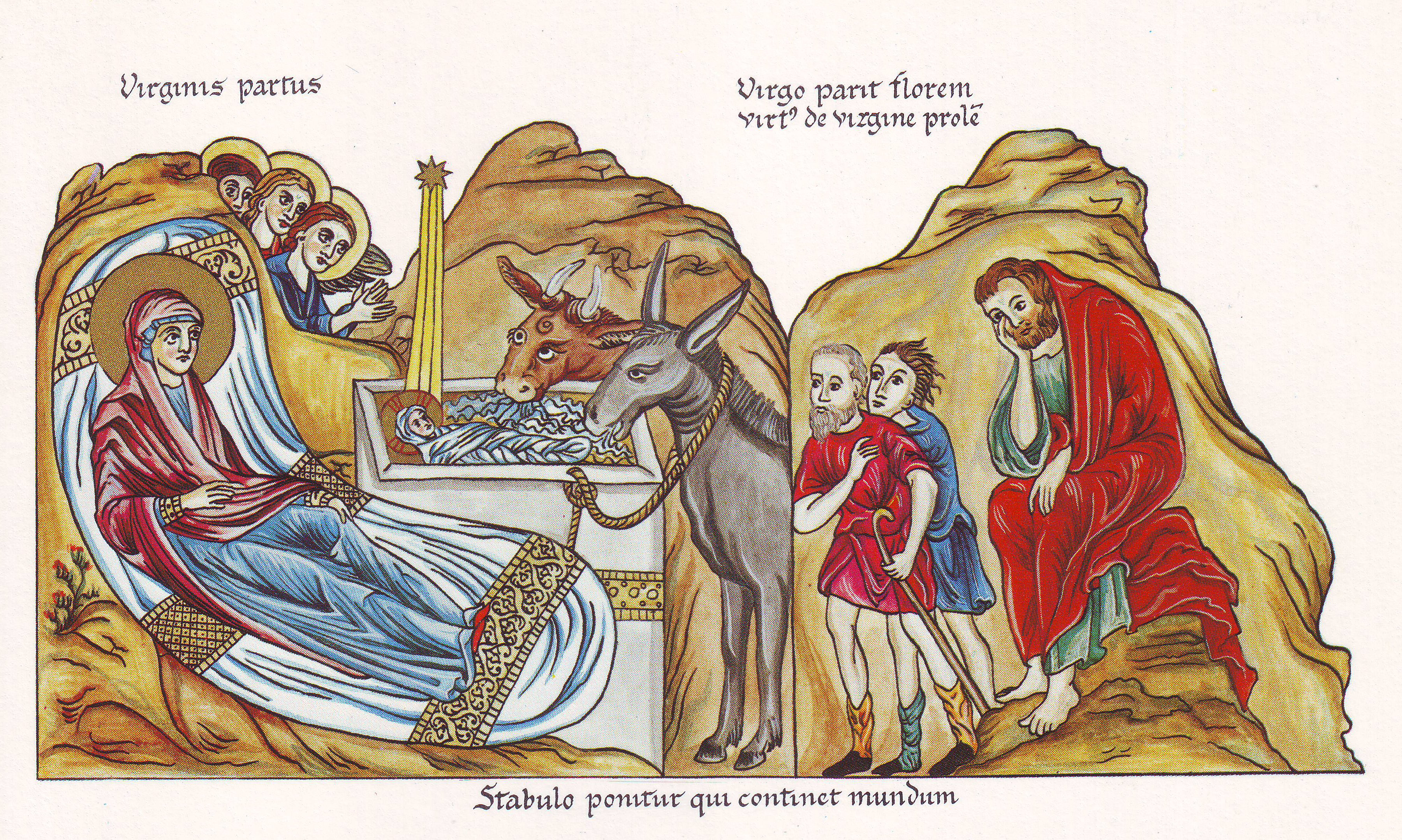
Nativity of Christ, medieval illustration from the Hortus deliciarum of Herrad of Landsberg, 12th century

In the 2nd century, the "earliest church records" indicate that "Christians were remembering and celebrating the birth of the Lord", an "observance [that] sprang up organically from the authentic devotion of ordinary believers"; although "they did not agree upon a set date". Though Christmas did not appear on the lists of festivals given by the early Christian writers Irenaeus and Tertullian, the early Church Fathers John Chrysostom, Augustine of Hippo, and Jerome attested to December 25 as the date of Christmas toward the end of the fourth century.

The earliest document to place Jesus's birthday on December 25 is the Chronograph of 354 (also called the Calendar of Filocalus), which also names it as the birthday of the god Sol Invictus (the 'Invincible Sun'). Liturgical historians generally agree that this part of the text was written in Rome in AD 336. This is consistent with the assertion that the date was formally set by Pope Julius I, bishop of Rome from 337 to 352. December 25 was the traditional date of the winter solstice in the Roman Empire, where most Christians lived, and the Roman festival Dies Natalis Solis Invicti (birthday of Sol Invictus) had been held on this date since AD 274.

In the East, the birth of Jesus was celebrated in connection with the Epiphany on January 6. This holiday was not primarily about Christ's birth, but rather his baptism. Christmas was promoted in the East as part of the revival of Orthodox Christianity that followed the death of the pro-Arian Emperor Valens at the Battle of Adrianople in 378. The feast was introduced in Constantinople in 379, in Antioch by John Chrysostom towards the end of the fourth century, probably in 388, and in Alexandria in the following century. There is evidence that Christmas was celebrated in Jerusalem by the sixth century.

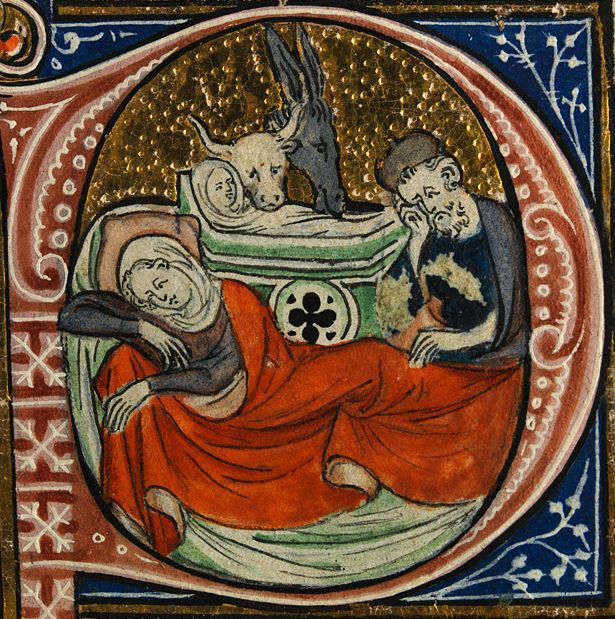
The Nativity, from a 14th-century missal, a liturgical book containing texts and music necessary for the celebration of Mass throughout the year

In the Early Middle Ages, Christmas Day was overshadowed by Epiphany, which in western Christianity focused on the visit of the magi. However, the medieval calendar was dominated by Christmas-related holidays. The forty days before Christmas became the "forty days of St. Martin" (which began on November 11, the feast of St. Martin of Tours), now known as Advent. In Italy, former Saturnalian traditions were attached to Advent. Around the 12th century, these traditions transferred again to the Twelve Days of Christmas (December 25 – January 5); a time that appears in the liturgical calendars as Christmastide or Twelve Holy Days.

In 567, the Council of Tours put in place the season of Christmastide, proclaiming "the twelve days from Christmas to Epiphany as a sacred and festive season, and established the duty of Advent fasting in preparation for the feast". This was done in order to solve the "administrative problem for the Roman Empire as it tried to coordinate the solar Julian calendar with the lunar calendars of its provinces in the east".

The prominence of Christmas Day increased gradually after Charlemagne was crowned Emperor on Christmas Day in 800. King Edmund the Martyr was anointed on Christmas in 855 and King William I of England was crowned on Christmas Day 1066.

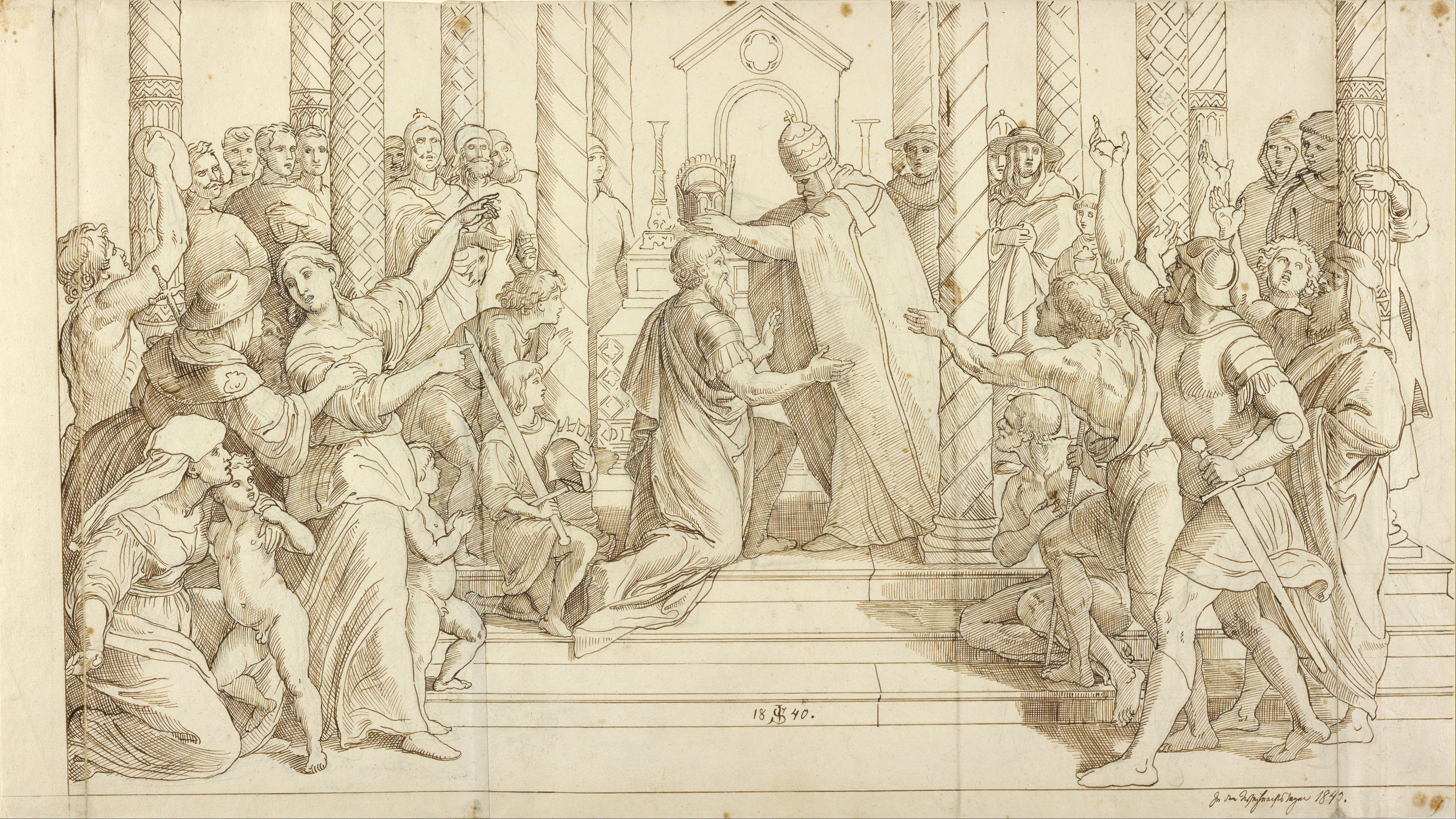
The coronation of Charlemagne on Christmas of 800 helped promote the popularity of the holiday.

By the High Middle Ages, the holiday had become so prominent that chroniclers routinely noted where various magnates celebrated Christmas. King Richard II of England hosted a Christmas feast in 1377 at which 28 oxen and 300 sheep were eaten. The Yule boar was a common feature of medieval Christmas feasts. Caroling also became popular, and was originally performed by a group of dancers who sang. The group was composed of a lead singer and a ring of dancers that provided the chorus. Writers of the time condemned caroling as lewd, indicating that the unruly traditions of Saturnalia and Yule may have continued in this form. "Misrule"—drunkenness, promiscuity, gambling—was also an important aspect of the festival. In England, gifts were exchanged on New Year's Day (a custom at the royal court), and there was special Christmas ale.

Christmas during the Middle Ages was a public festival that incorporated ivy, holly, and other evergreens. Christmas gift-giving during the Middle Ages was usually between people with legal relationships, such as tenant and landlord. The annual indulgence in eating, dancing, singing, sporting, and card playing escalated in England, and by the 17th century the Christmas season featured lavish dinners, elaborate masques, and pageants. In 1607, King James I insisted that a play be acted on Christmas night and that the court indulge in games. It was during the Reformation in 16th–17th-century Europe that many Protestants changed the gift bringer to the Christ Child or Christkindl, and the date of giving gifts changed from December 6 to Christmas Eve.

=== 17th and 18th centuries ===
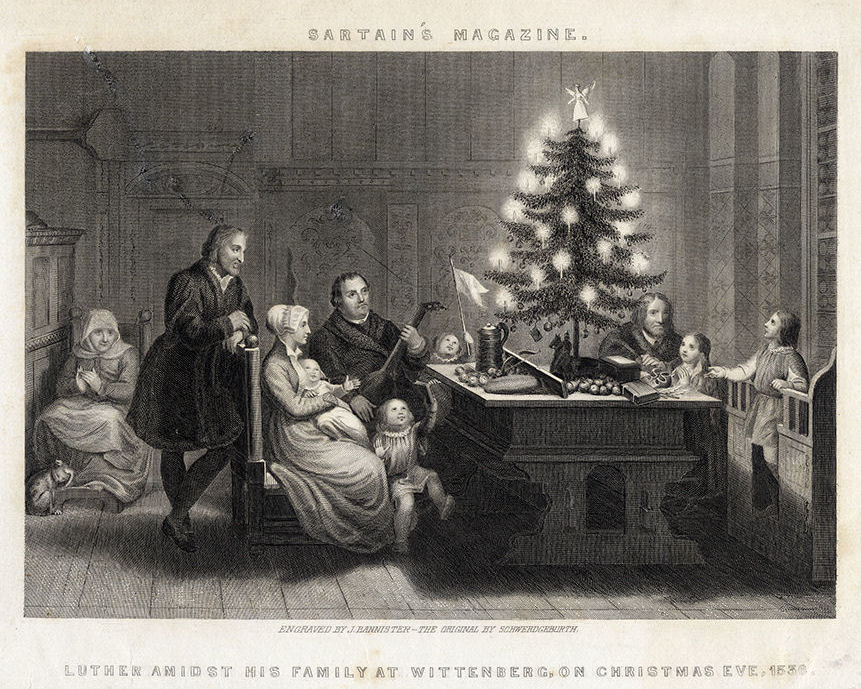
Martin Luther played a role in the emergence of the Christmas tree and in the tradition of presents on Christmas Eve.

Following the Protestant Reformation, many of the new denominations, including the Anglican Church and Lutheran Church, continued to celebrate Christmas. In 1629, the Anglican poet John Milton penned On the Morning of Christ's Nativity, a poem that has since been read by many during Christmastide. Donald Heinz, a professor at California State University, Chico, states that Martin Luther "inaugurated a period in which Germany would produce a unique culture of Christmas, much copied in North America". Among the congregations of the Dutch Reformed Church, Christmas was celebrated as one of the principal evangelical feasts.

However, in 17th century England, some groups such as the Puritans strongly condemned the celebration of Christmas, considering it a Catholic invention and the "trappings of popery" or the "rags of the Beast". In contrast, the established Anglican Church "pressed for a more elaborate observance of feasts, penitential seasons, and saints' days. The calendar reform became a major point of tension between the Anglican party and the Puritan party". The Catholic Church also responded, promoting the festival in a more religiously oriented form. King Charles I of England directed his noblemen and gentry to return to their landed estates in midwinter to keep up their old-style Christmas generosity. Following the Parliamentarian victory over Charles I during the English Civil War, England's Puritan rulers banned Christmas in 1647. Oliver Cromwell even ordered his troops to confiscate any special meals made on Christmas Day.

Protests followed as pro-Christmas rioting broke out in several cities and for weeks Canterbury was controlled by the rioters, who decorated doorways with holly and shouted royalist slogans. Football, among the sports the Puritans banned on a Sunday, was also used as a rebellious force: when Puritans outlawed Christmas in England in December 1647 the crowd brought out footballs as a symbol of festive misrule. The book, The Vindication of Christmas (London, 1652), argued against the Puritans, and makes note of Old English Christmas traditions, dinner, roast apples on the fire, card playing, dances with "plow-boys" and "maidservants", old Father Christmas and carol singing. During the ban, semi-clandestine religious services marking Christ's birth continued to be held, and people sang carols in secret.

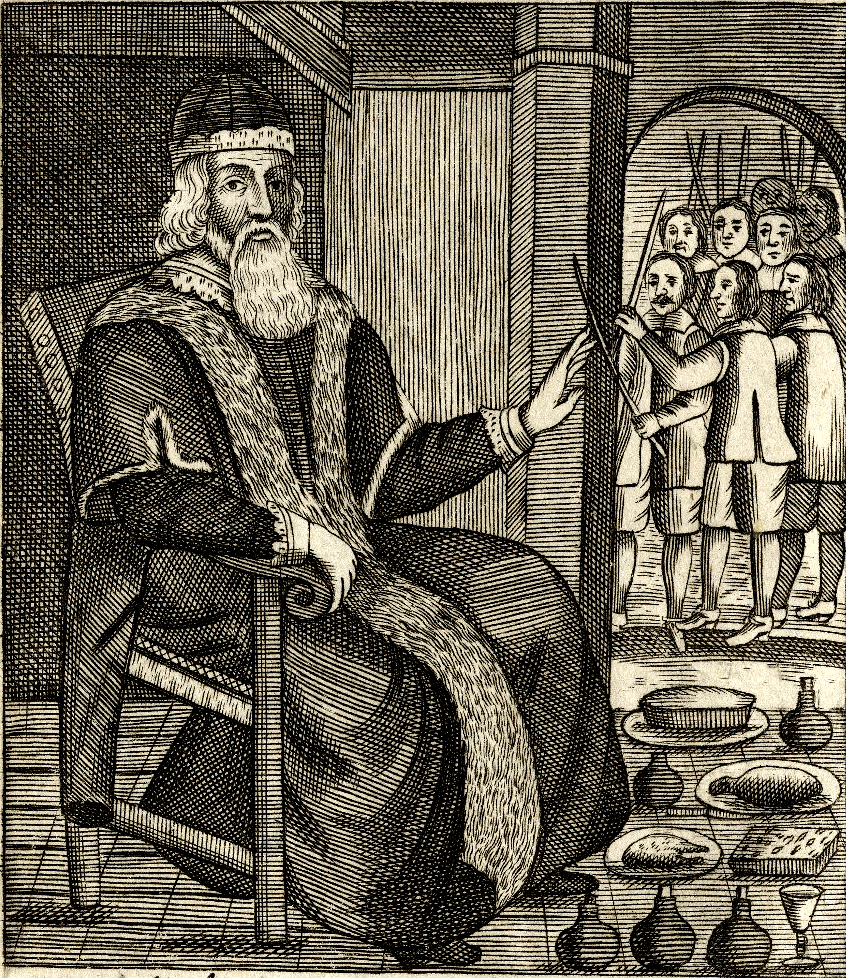
The Examination and Tryal of Old Father Christmas, (1686), published after Christmas was reinstated as a holy day in England

Christmas was restored as a legal holiday in England with the Restoration of King Charles II in 1660 when Puritan legislation was declared void, with Christmas again freely celebrated in England. Many Calvinist clergymen disapproved of Christmas celebrations. As such, in Scotland, the Presbyterian Church of Scotland discouraged the observance of Christmas, and though James VI commanded its celebration in 1618, attendance at church was scant. The Parliament of Scotland officially abolished the observance of Christmas in 1640, claiming that the church had been "purged of all superstitious observation of days". Whereas in England, Wales and Ireland Christmas Day is a common law holiday, having been a customary holiday since time immemorial, it was not until 1871 that it was designated a bank holiday in Scotland. The diary of James Woodforde, from the latter half of the 18th century, details the observance of Christmas and celebrations associated with the season over a number of years.

As in England, Puritans in Colonial America staunchly opposed the observation of Christmas. The Pilgrims of New England pointedly spent their first December 25 in the New World working normally. Puritans such as Cotton Mather condemned Christmas both because scripture did not mention its observance and because Christmas celebrations of the day often involved boisterous behavior. Many non-Puritans in New England deplored the loss of the holidays enjoyed by the laboring classes in England. Christmas observance was outlawed in Boston in 1659. The ban on Christmas observance was revoked in 1681 by English governor Edmund Andros, but it was not until the mid-19th century that celebrating Christmas became fashionable in the Boston region.

At the same time, Christian residents of Virginia and New York observed the holiday freely. Pennsylvania Dutch settlers, predominantly Moravian settlers of Bethlehem, Nazareth, and Lititz in Pennsylvania and the Wachovia settlements in North Carolina, were enthusiastic celebrators of Christmas. The Moravians in Bethlehem had the first Christmas trees in America as well as the first Nativity Scenes. Christmas fell out of favor in the United States after the American Revolution, when it was considered an English custom.

With the atheistic Cult of Reason in power during the era of Revolutionary France, Christian Christmas religious services were banned and the three kings cake was renamed the "equality cake" under anticlerical government policies.

=== 19th century ===
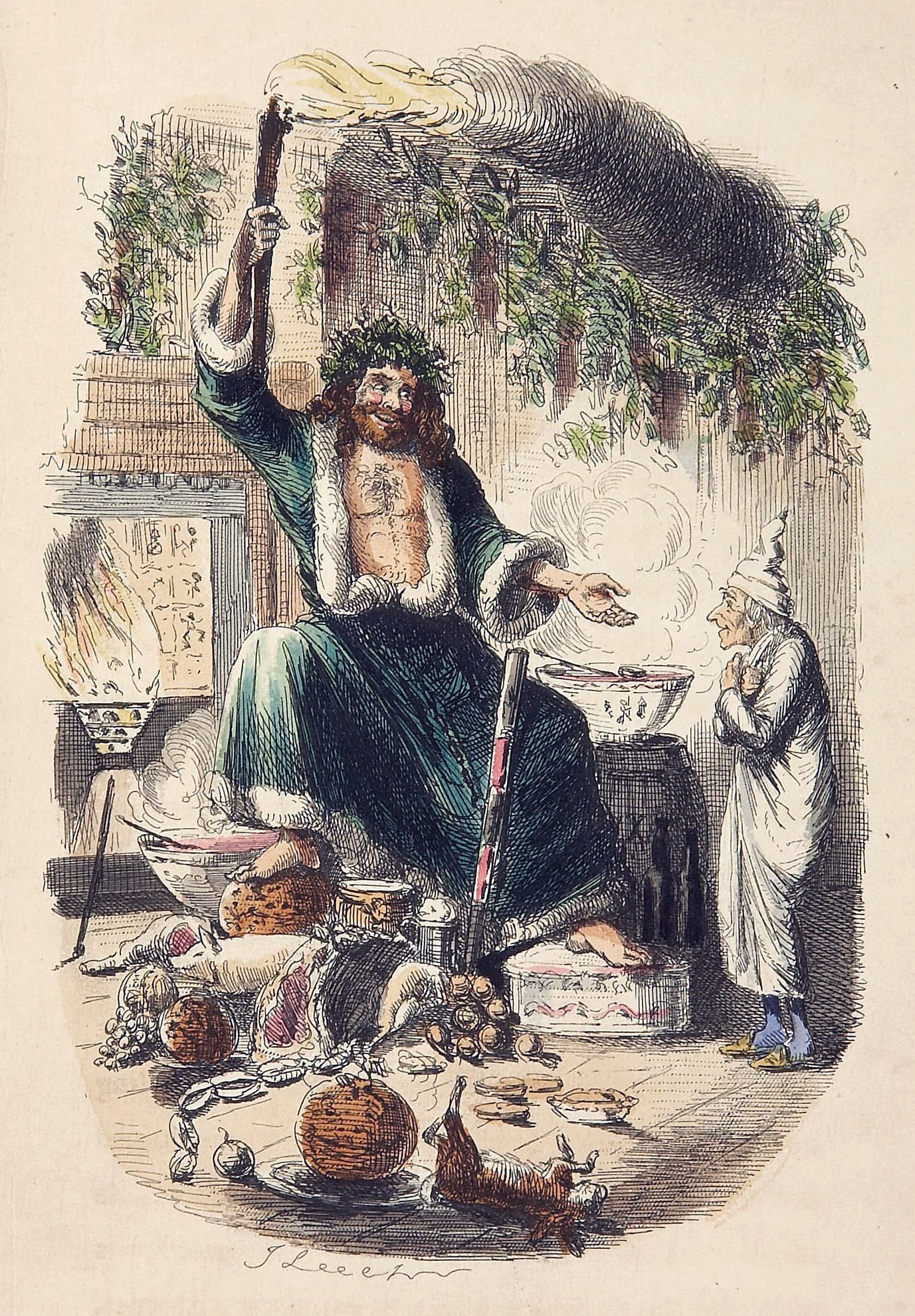
Ebenezer Scrooge and the Ghost of Christmas Present, from Charles Dickens's A Christmas Carol, 1843

In the early 19th century, Christmas festivities and services gradually spread with the rise of the Oxford Movement in the Church of England that emphasized the centrality of Christmas in Christianity and charity to the poor, along with Washington Irving, Charles Dickens, and other authors emphasizing family, children, kind-heartedness, gift-giving, and Santa Claus (for Irving), or Father Christmas (for Dickens). An indication this increased recognition of Christmas was slow, however, is seen in the fact that "in twenty of the years between 1790 and 1835, The Times did not mention Christmas at all."

In the early-19th century, writers imagined Tudor-period Christmas as a time of heartfelt celebration. In 1835, Thomas Hervey and Robert Seymour published The Christmas Book in which they introduced what has been called a "national Christmas narrative." In his book, Hervey asserted: "the revels of merry England are fast subsiding into silence, and her many customs wearing gradually away." In 1843, Charles Dickens wrote the novel A Christmas Carol, which helped revive the "spirit" of Christmas and seasonal merriment. Its instant popularity played a major role in portraying Christmas as a holiday emphasizing family, goodwill, and compassion.

Dickens sought to construct Christmas as a family-centered festival of generosity, linking "worship and feasting, within a context of social reconciliation". Superimposing his humanitarian vision of the holiday, in what has been termed "Carol Philosophy", Dickens influenced many aspects of Christmas that are celebrated today in Western culture, such as family gatherings, seasonal food and drink, dancing, games, and a festive generosity of spirit. It has been said that Dickens' breakthrough with A Christmas Carol was his "ingenious pairing of seasonal fiction and seasonal [book] sales." A prominent phrase from the tale, "Merry Christmas", was popularized following the appearance of the story. This coincided with the appearance of the Oxford Movement and the growth of Anglo-Catholicism, which led a revival in traditional rituals and religious observances.

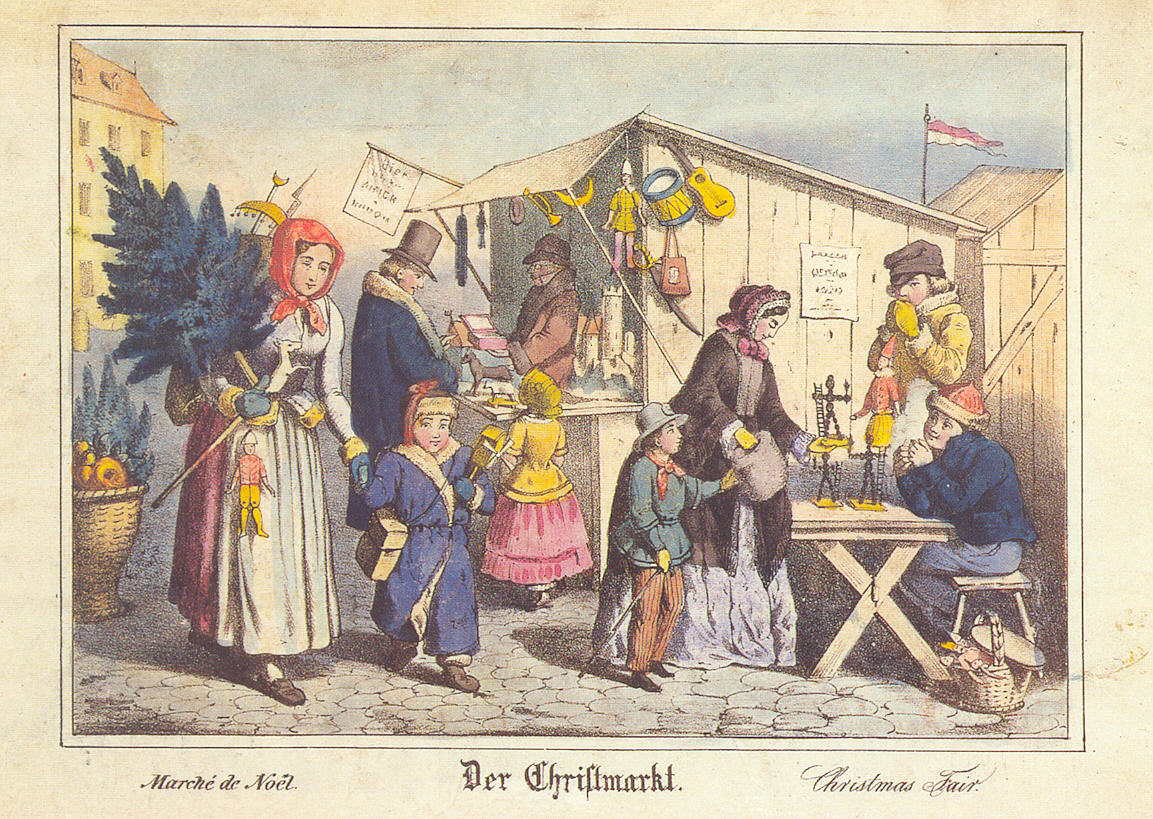
19th-century lithograph showing the Christkindlesmarkt (Christmas market) in Nuremberg, Germany

The term Scrooge became a synonym for miser, with the phrase "Bah! Humbug!" becoming emblematic of a dismissive attitude of the festive spirit. In 1843, the first commercial Christmas card was produced by Sir Henry Cole. The revival of the Christmas Carol began with William Sandys's Christmas Carols Ancient and Modern (1833), with the first appearance in print of "The First Noel", "I Saw Three Ships", "Hark the Herald Angels Sing" and "God Rest Ye Merry, Gentlemen", popularized in Dickens's A Christmas Carol.

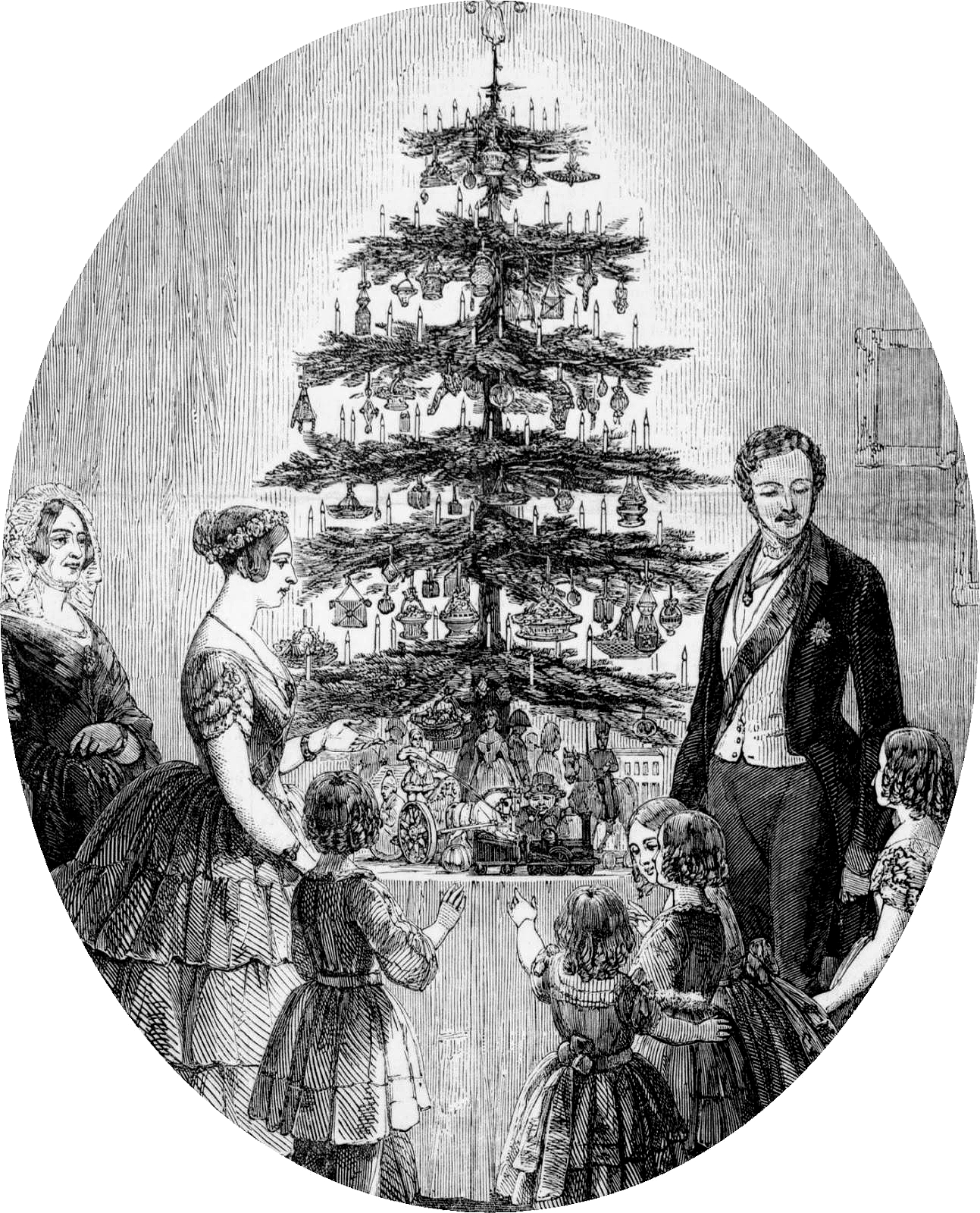
The Queen's Christmas tree at Windsor Castle, published in the Illustrated London News, 1848

In Britain, the Christmas tree was introduced in the early 19th century by the German-born Queen Charlotte. In 1832, the future Queen Victoria wrote about her delight at having a Christmas tree, hung with lights, ornaments, and presents placed round it. After her marriage to her German cousin Prince Albert, by 1841 the custom became more widespread throughout Britain. An image of the British royal family with their Christmas tree at Windsor Castle created a sensation when it was published in the Illustrated London News in 1848. A modified version of this image was published in Godey's Lady's Book, Philadelphia in 1850. By the 1870s, putting up a Christmas tree had become common in America.

In America, interest in Christmas had been revived in the 1820s by several short stories by Washington Irving which appear in his The Sketch Book of Geoffrey Crayon, Gent. and "Old Christmas". Irving's stories depicted harmonious warm-hearted English Christmas festivities he experienced while staying in Aston Hall, Birmingham, England, that had largely been abandoned, and he used the tract Vindication of Christmas (1652) of Old English Christmas traditions, that he had transcribed into his journal as a format for his stories.

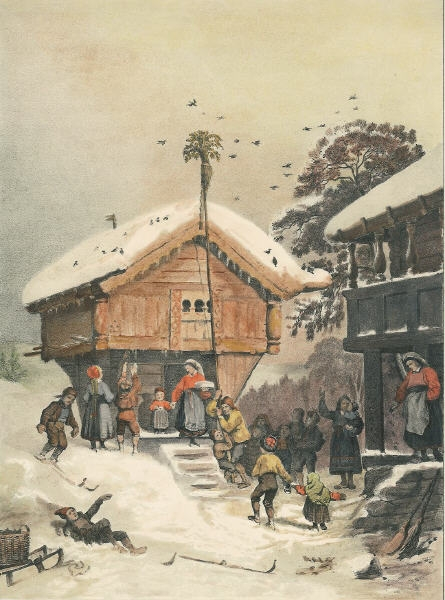
A Norwegian Christmas, 1846 painting by Adolph Tidemand

In 1822, Clement Clarke Moore wrote the poem A Visit From St. Nicholas (popularly known by its first line: Twas the Night Before Christmas). The poem helped popularize the tradition of exchanging gifts, and seasonal Christmas shopping began to assume economic importance. This also started the cultural conflict between the holiday's spiritual significance and its associated commercialism that some see as corrupting the holiday. In her 1850 book The First Christmas in New England, Harriet Beecher Stowe includes a character who complains that the true meaning of Christmas was lost in a shopping spree.

While the celebration of Christmas was not yet customary in some regions in the U.S., Henry Wadsworth Longfellow detected "a transition state about Christmas here in New England" in 1856. "The old puritan feeling prevents it from being a cheerful, hearty holiday; though every year makes it more so". In Reading, Pennsylvania, a newspaper remarked in 1861, "Even our presbyterian friends who have hitherto steadfastly ignored Christmas—threw open their church doors and assembled in force to celebrate the anniversary of the Savior's birth."

The First Congregational Church of Rockford, Illinois, "although of genuine Puritan stock", was 'preparing for a grand Christmas jubilee', a news correspondent reported in 1864. By 1860, fourteen states including several from New England had adopted Christmas as a legal holiday. In 1875, Louis Prang introduced the Christmas card to Americans. He has been called the "father of the American Christmas card". On June 28, 1870, Christmas was formally declared a United States federal holiday.

=== 20th and 21st centuries ===
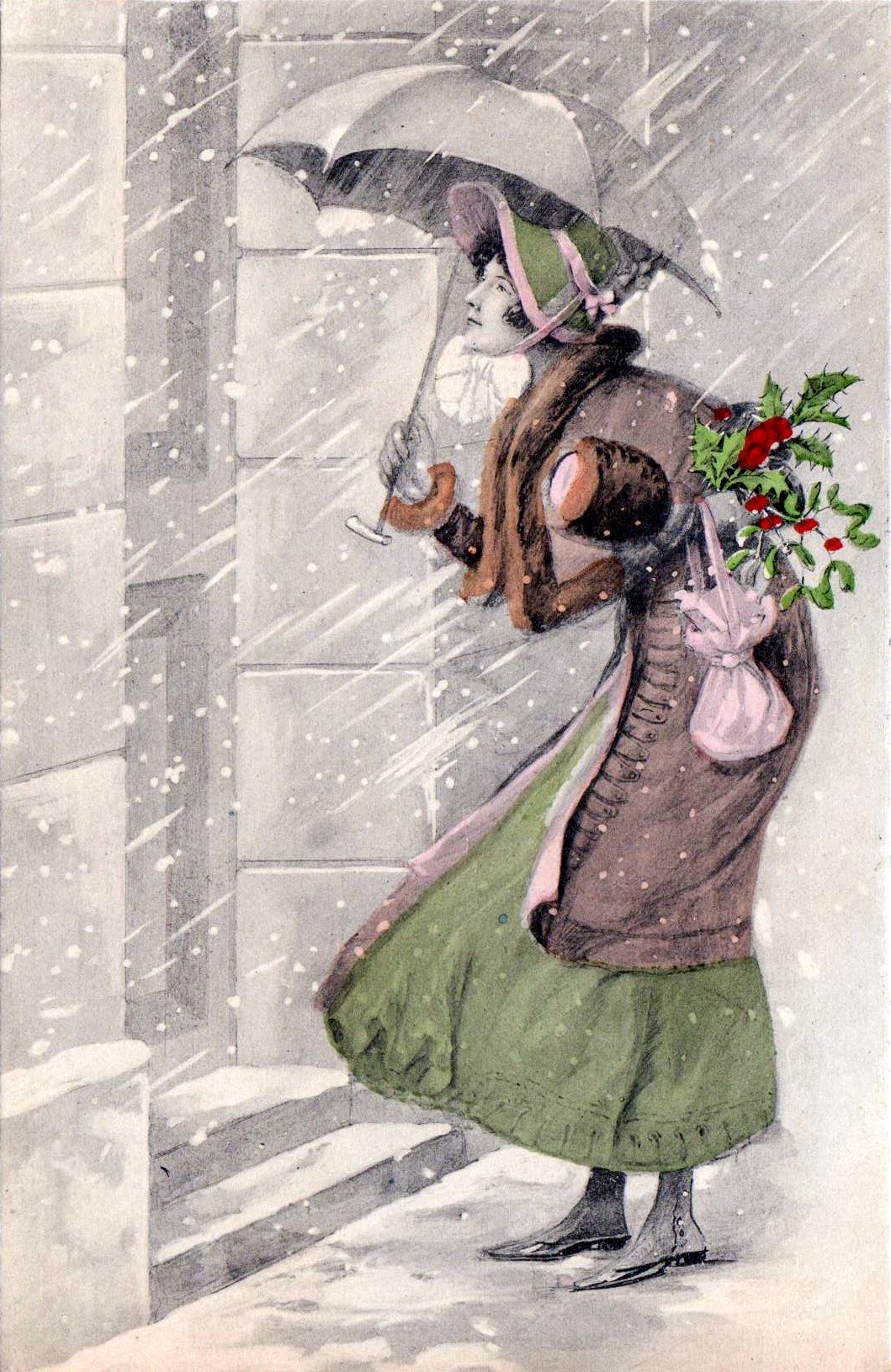
The Christmas Visit. Postcard, c. 1910

During the First World War and particularly in 1914, a series of informal truces took place for Christmas between opposing armies. The truces, which were organised spontaneously by fighting men, ranged from promises not to shoot (shouted at a distance in order to ease the pressure of war for the day) to friendly socializing, gift giving and even sport between enemies. These incidents became a well known and semi-mythologised part of popular memory. They have been described as a symbol of common humanity even in the darkest of situations and used to demonstrate to children the ideals of Christmas.

Under the state atheism of the Soviet Union, after its foundation in 1917, Christmas celebrations—along with other Christian holidays—were prohibited in public. During the 1920s, 1930s, and 1940s, the League of Militant Atheists encouraged school pupils to campaign against Christmas traditions, such as the Christmas tree, as well as other Christian holidays, including Easter; the League established an antireligious holiday to be the 31st of each month as a replacement. At the height of this persecution, in 1929, on Christmas Day, children in Moscow were encouraged to spit on crucifixes as a protest against the holiday. Instead, the importance of the holiday and all its trappings, such as the Christmas tree and gift-giving, was transferred to the New Year. It was not until the dissolution of the Soviet Union in 1991 that the persecution ended and Orthodox Christmas became a state holiday again for the first time in Russia after seven decades.

European History Professor Joseph Perry wrote that likewise, in Nazi Germany, "because Nazi ideologues saw organized religion as an enemy of the totalitarian state, propagandists sought to deemphasize—or eliminate altogether—the Christian aspects of the holiday" and that "Propagandists tirelessly promoted numerous Nazified Christmas songs, which replaced Christian themes with the regime's racial ideologies".

In the U.S., especially in the later 20th century and the 21st century, in addition to Merry Christmas, there is an increasing tendency to use the greeting Happy Holidays, which is generally seen as more inclusive of other non-Christian wintertime religious celebrations, such as Hanukkah and Kwanzaa. In the U.S., and Canada, where the use of the term "Holidays" is most prevalent, opponents of its usage have denounced what they perceive to be avoidance of using the term "Christmas" as being politically correct. Some right-wing Christian organizations, such as Pat Robertson's American Center for Law and Justice, cite these alleged "attacks" on Christmas as constituting a "War on Christmas", a term largely popularized by conservative commentator Bill O'Reilly. However "Happy Holidays" has been commonly used in the US for over 100 years.

== Observance and traditions ==
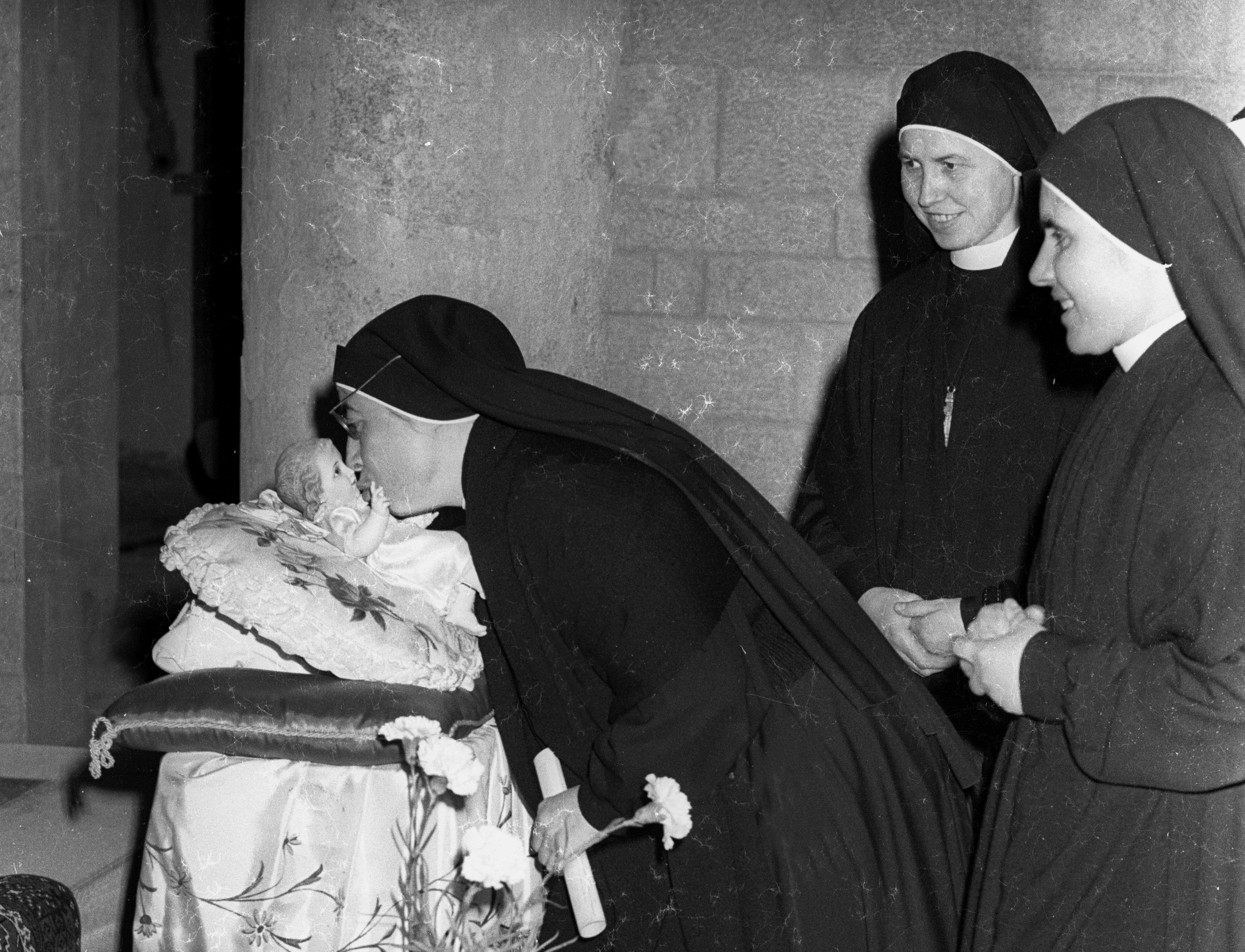
Christmas at the Annunciation Church in Nazareth, 1965

Dark brown – countries that do not recognize Christmas on December 25 or January 7 as a public holiday. Light brown – countries that do not recognize Christmas as a public holiday, but the holiday is given observance

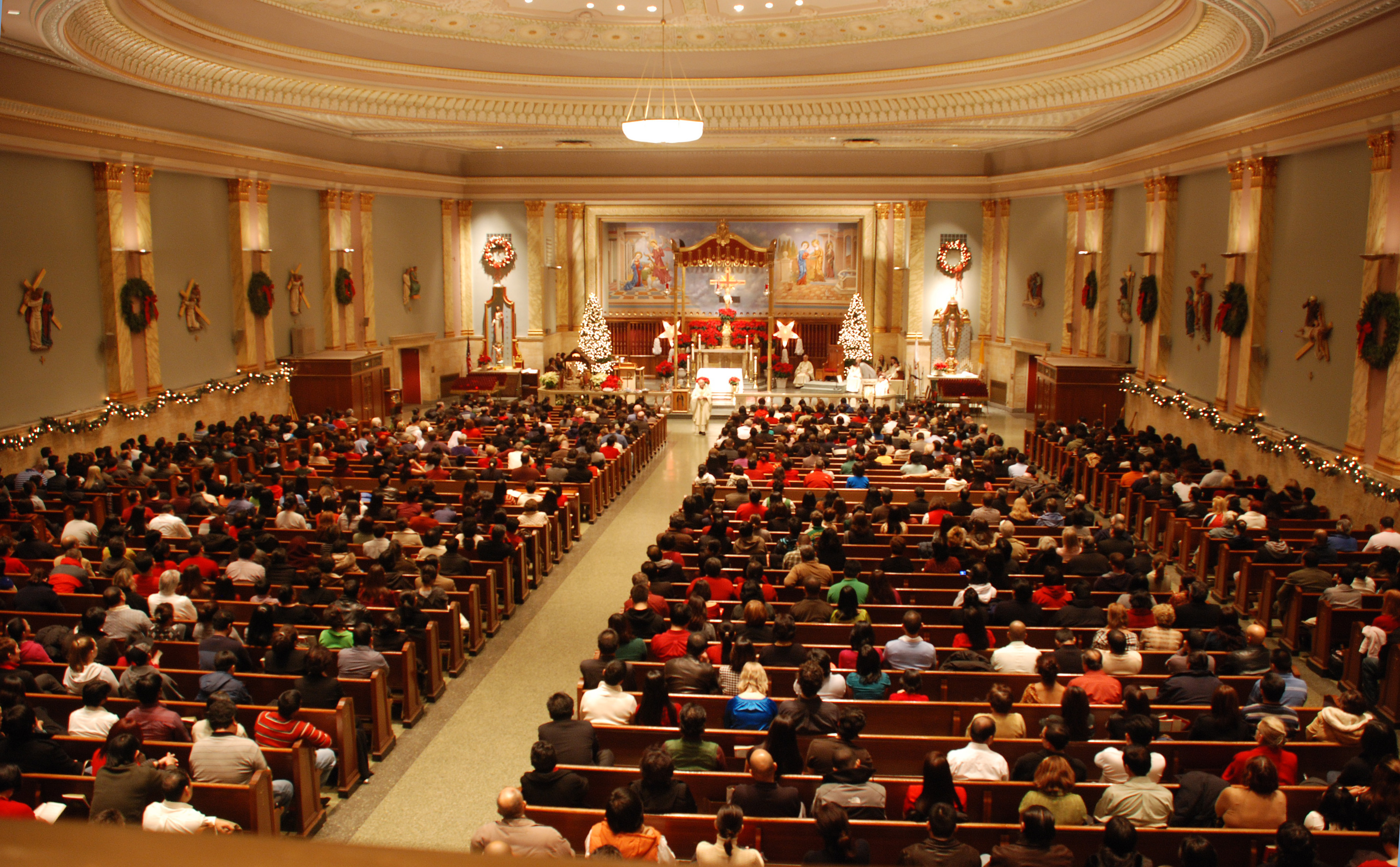
Many Christians attend church services to celebrate the birth of Jesus Christ

Christmas Day is celebrated as a major festival and public holiday in countries around the world, including many whose populations are mostly non-Christian. In some non-Christian areas, periods of former colonial rule introduced the celebration (e.g. Hong Kong); in others, Christian minorities or foreign cultural influences have led populations to observe the holiday. Countries such as Japan, where Christmas is popular despite there being only a small number of Christians, have adopted many of the cultural aspects of Christmas, such as gift-giving, decorations, and Christmas trees. A similar example is in Turkey, being Muslim-majority and with a small number of Christians, where Christmas trees and decorations tend to line public streets during the festival.

Many popular customs associated with Christmas developed independently of the commemoration of Jesus's birth, with some claiming that certain elements are Christianized and have origins in pre-Christian festivals that were celebrated by pagan populations who were later converted to Christianity; other scholars reject these claims and affirm that Christmas customs largely developed in a Christian context. The prevailing atmosphere of Christmas has also continually evolved since the holiday's inception, ranging from a sometimes raucous, drunken, carnival-like state in the Middle Ages, to a tamer family-oriented and children-centered theme introduced in a 19th-century transformation. The celebration of Christmas was banned on more than one occasion within certain groups, such as the Puritans and Jehovah's Witnesses (who do not celebrate birthdays in general), due to concerns that it was too unbiblical. Celtic winter herbs such as mistletoe and ivy, and the custom of kissing under a mistletoe, are common in modern Christmas celebrations in the English-speaking countries.

The pre-Christian Germanic peoples—including the Anglo-Saxons and the Norse—celebrated a winter festival called Yule, held in the late December to early January period, yielding modern English yule, today used as a synonym for Christmas. In Germanic language-speaking areas, numerous elements of modern Christmas folk custom and iconography may have originated from Yule, including the Yule log, Yule boar, and the Yule goat. Often leading a ghostly procession through the sky (the Wild Hunt), the long-bearded god Odin is referred to as "the Yule one" and "Yule father" in Old Norse texts, while other gods are referred to as "Yule beings". On the other hand, as there are no reliable existing references to a Christmas log prior to the 16th century, the burning of the Christmas block may have been an early modern invention by Christians unrelated to the pagan practice.

Among countries with a strong Christian tradition, a variety of Christmas celebrations have developed that incorporate regional and local cultures. For example, in eastern Europe Christmas celebrations incorporated pre-Christian traditions such as the Koleda, which shares parallels with the Christmas carol.

=== Church attendance ===
Christmas Day (inclusive of its vigil, Christmas Eve), is a Festival in the Lutheran churches, a solemnity in the Roman Catholic Church, and a Principal Feast of the Anglican Communion. Other Christian denominations do not rank their feast days but nevertheless place importance on Christmas Eve/Christmas Day, as with other Christian feasts like Easter, Ascension Day, and Pentecost. As such, for Christians, attending a Christmas Eve or Christmas Day church service plays an important part in the recognition of the Christmas season. Christmas, along with Easter, is the period of the highest annual church attendance. A 2010 survey by LifeWay Christian Resources found that six in ten Americans attend church services during this time. In the United Kingdom, the Church of England reported an estimated attendance of 2.5 million people at Christmas services in 2015.

=== Decorations ===
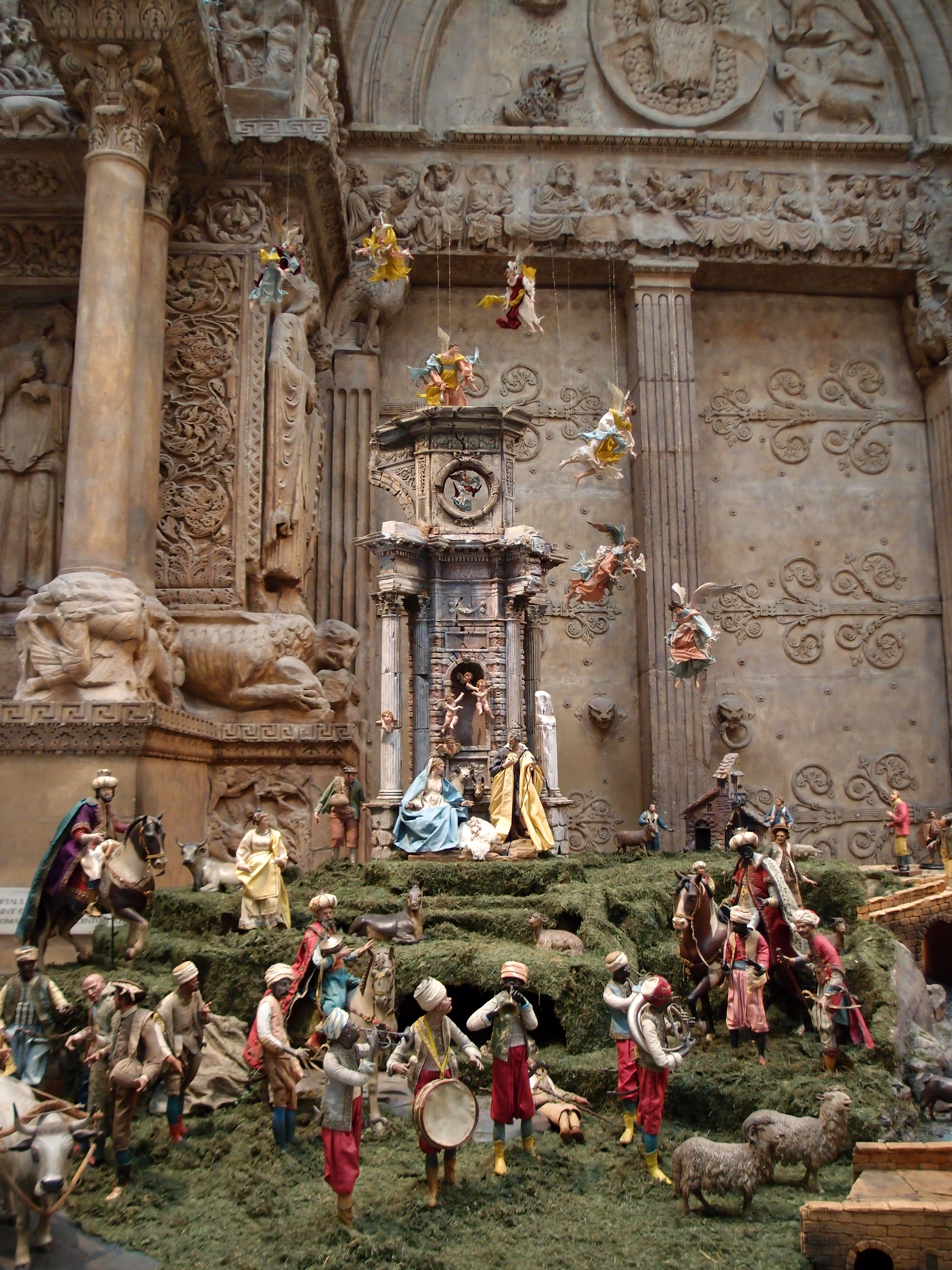
Neapolitan nativity scene

Nativity scenes are known from 10th-century Rome. They were popularised by Saint Francis of Assisi from 1223, quickly spreading across Europe. Different types of decorations developed across the Christian world, dependent on local tradition and available resources, and can vary from simple representations of the crib to far more elaborate sets – renowned manger scene traditions include the colourful Kraków szopka in Poland, which imitate Kraków's historical buildings as settings, the elaborate Italian presepi (Neapolitan, Genoese and Bolognese), or the Provençal crèches in southern France, using hand-painted terracotta figurines called santons. In certain parts of the world, notably Sicily, living Nativity scenes following the tradition of Saint Francis are a popular alternative to static crèches. The first commercially produced decorations appeared in Germany in the 1860s, inspired by paper chains made by children. In countries where a representation of the Nativity scene is very popular, people are encouraged to compete and create the most original or realistic ones. Within some families, the pieces used to make the representation are considered a valuable family heirloom.

The traditional colours of Christmas decorations are red, green, and gold. Red symbolizes the blood of Jesus, which was shed in his crucifixion; green symbolizes eternal life, and in particular the evergreen tree, which does not lose its leaves in the winter; and gold is the first colour associated with Christmas, as one of the three gifts of the Magi, symbolizing royalty.

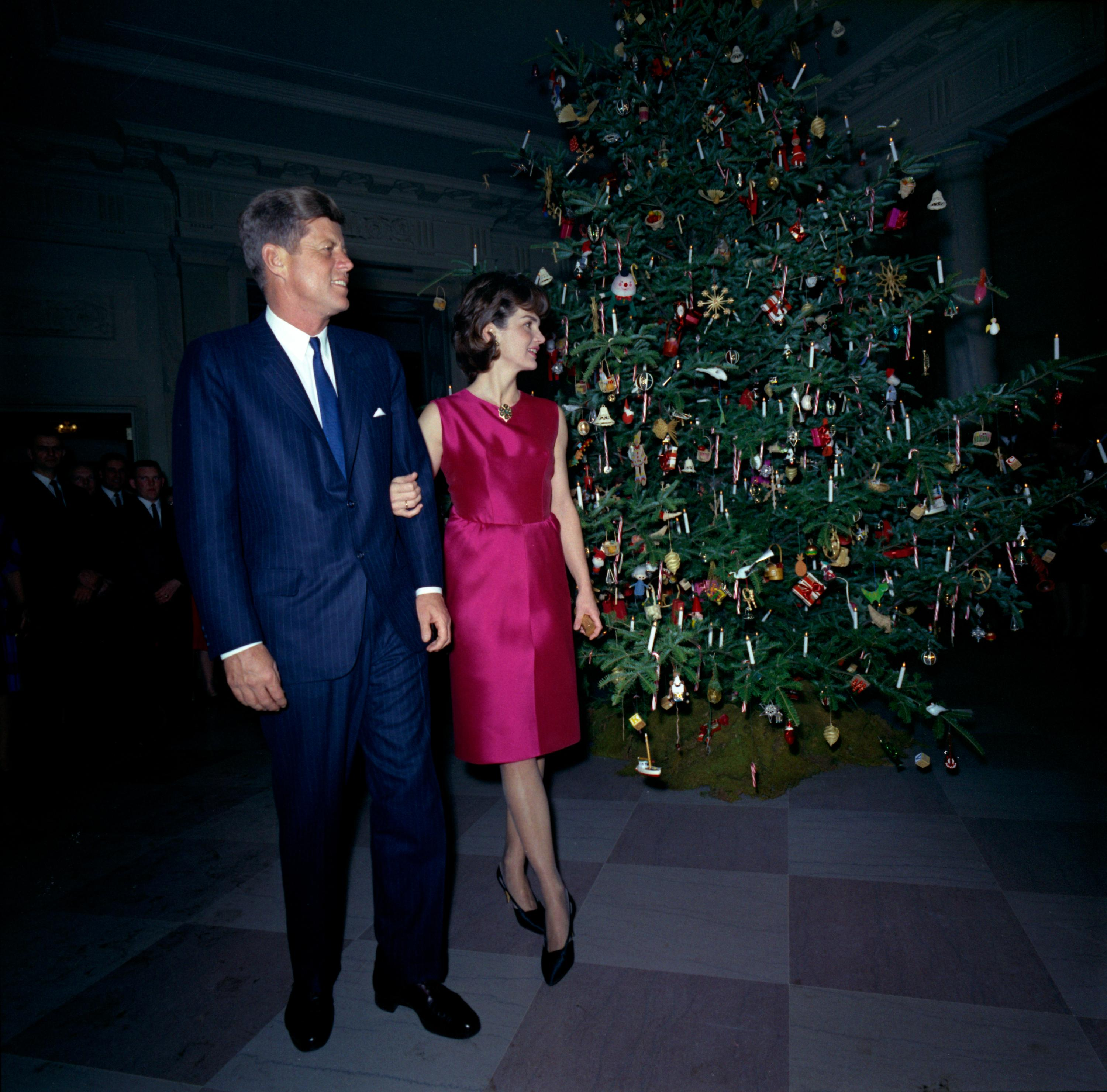
The official White House Christmas tree for 1962, displayed in the Entrance Hall and presented by US President John F. Kennedy and his wife Jackie

The Christmas tree was first used by German Lutherans in the 16th century, with records indicating that a Christmas tree was placed in the Cathedral of Strassburg in 1539, under the leadership of the Protestant Reformer, Martin Bucer. In the United States, these "German Lutherans brought the decorated Christmas tree with them; the Moravians put lighted candles on those trees". When decorating the Christmas tree, many individuals place a star at the top of the tree symbolizing the Star of Bethlehem, a fact recorded by The School Journal in 1897. Professor David Albert Jones of Oxford University writes that in the 19th century, it became popular for people to also use an angel to top the Christmas tree in order to symbolize the angels mentioned in the accounts of the Nativity of Jesus. Additionally, in the context of a Christian celebration of Christmas, the Christmas tree, being evergreen in colour, is symbolic of Christ, who offers eternal life; the candles or lights on the tree represent the Light of the World—Jesus—born in Bethlehem. Christian services for family use and public worship have been published for the blessing of a Christmas tree, after it has been erected. The Christmas tree is considered by some as Christianisation of pagan tradition and ritual surrounding the Winter Solstice, which included the use of evergreen boughs, and an adaptation of pagan tree worship; according to eighth-century biographer Æddi Stephanus, Saint Boniface (634–709), who was a missionary in Germany, took an ax to an oak tree dedicated to Thor and pointed out a fir tree, which he stated was a more fitting object of reverence because it pointed to heaven and it had a triangular shape, which he said was symbolic of the Trinity. The English language phrase "Christmas tree" is first recorded in 1835 and represents an importation from the German language.

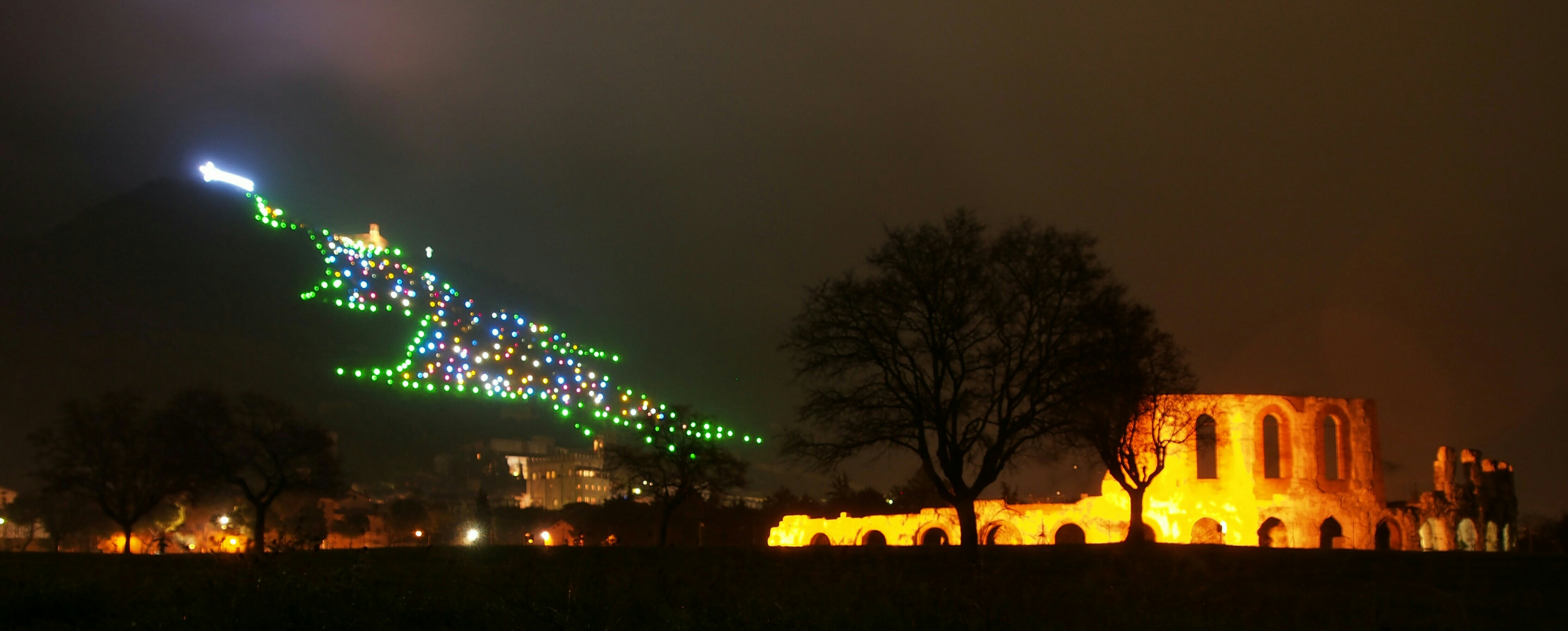
Mount Ingino Christmas Tree in Gubbio, Italy, the tallest Christmas tree in the world, 2014

In 1991, the Gubbio Christmas Tree, in Italy, 650 metres (2,130 ft) high and decorated with over 700 lights, entered the Guinness Book of Records as the tallest Christmas tree in the world.

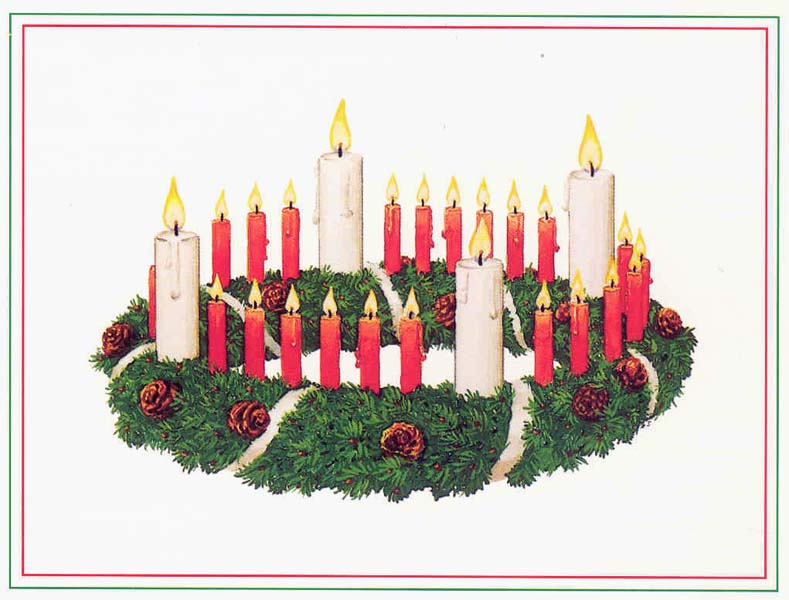
An advent wreath as designed by Johann Hinrich Wichern. On Christmas, the Christ Candle in the center of the wreath is traditionally lit in many church services.

Since the 16th century, the poinsettia, a native plant from Mexico, has been associated with Christmas carrying the Christian symbolism of the Star of Bethlehem; in that country it is known in Spanish as the Flower of the Holy Night. Other popular holiday plants include holly, mistletoe, red amaryllis, and Christmas cactus. Along with a Christmas tree, the interior of a home may be decorated with these plants, along with garlands and evergreen foliage. The display of Christmas villages has also become a tradition in many homes this season. The outside of houses may be decorated with lights and sometimes with illuminated Christmas figures. Mistletoe features prominently in European myth and folklore (for example, the legend of Baldr). It is customary to hang a sprig of mistletoe in the house at Christmas, and anyone standing underneath it may be kissed.

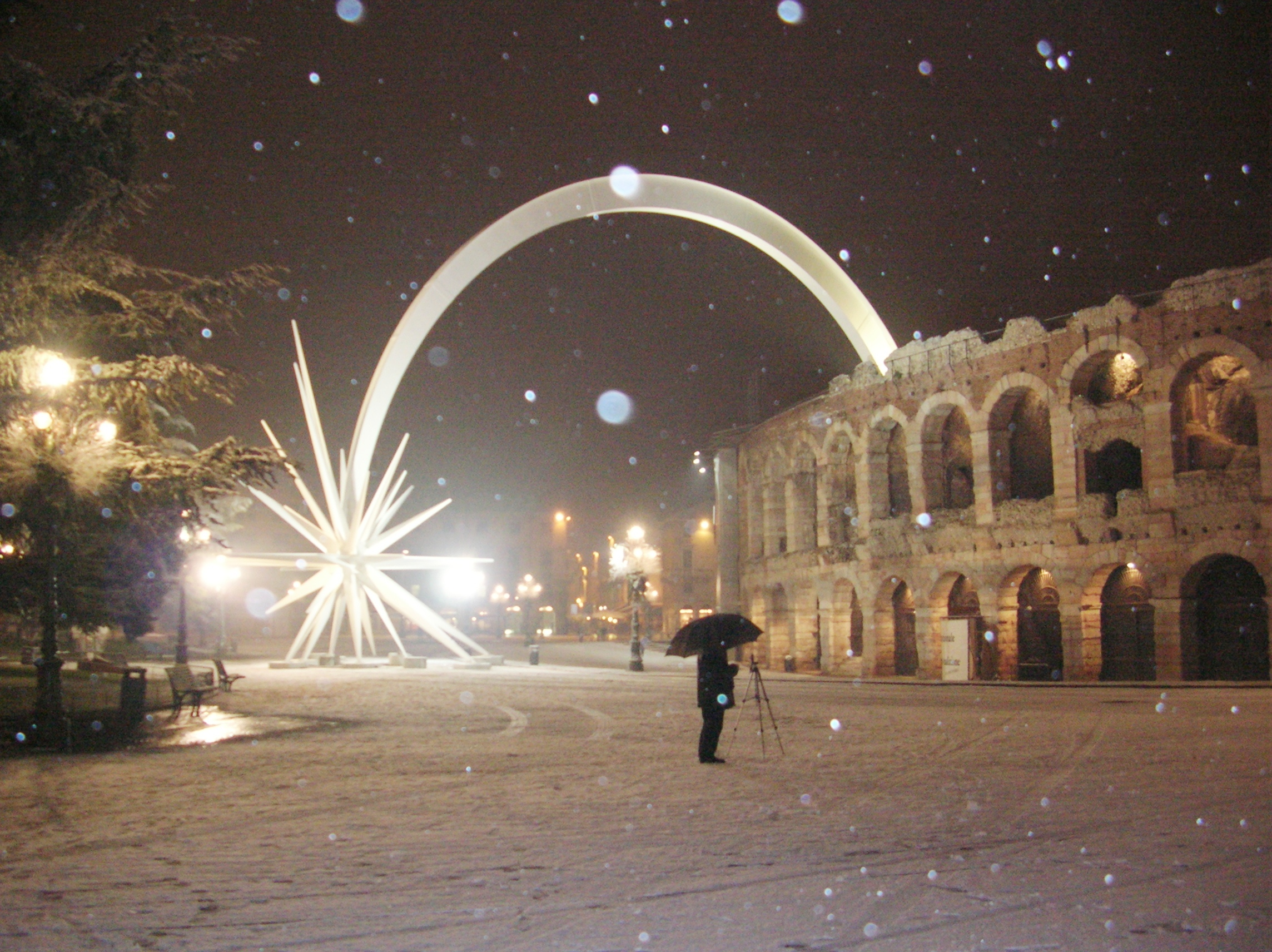
Christmas lights in Verona, Italy

Other traditional decorations include bells, candles, candy canes, stockings, wreaths, and angels. The wreaths and candles in each window are a more traditional Christmas display. The concentric assortment of leaves, usually from an evergreen, make up Christmas wreaths. Candles in each window are meant to demonstrate that Christians believe that Jesus Christ is the ultimate light of the world.

Christmas lights and banners may be hung along streets, music played by speakers, and Christmas trees placed in prominent places. It is common in many parts of the world for town squares and consumer shopping areas to sponsor and display decorations. Rolls of brightly colored paper with secular or religious Christmas motifs are manufactured to wrap gifts. In some countries, Christmas decorations are traditionally taken down on Twelfth Night.

=== Nativity play ===
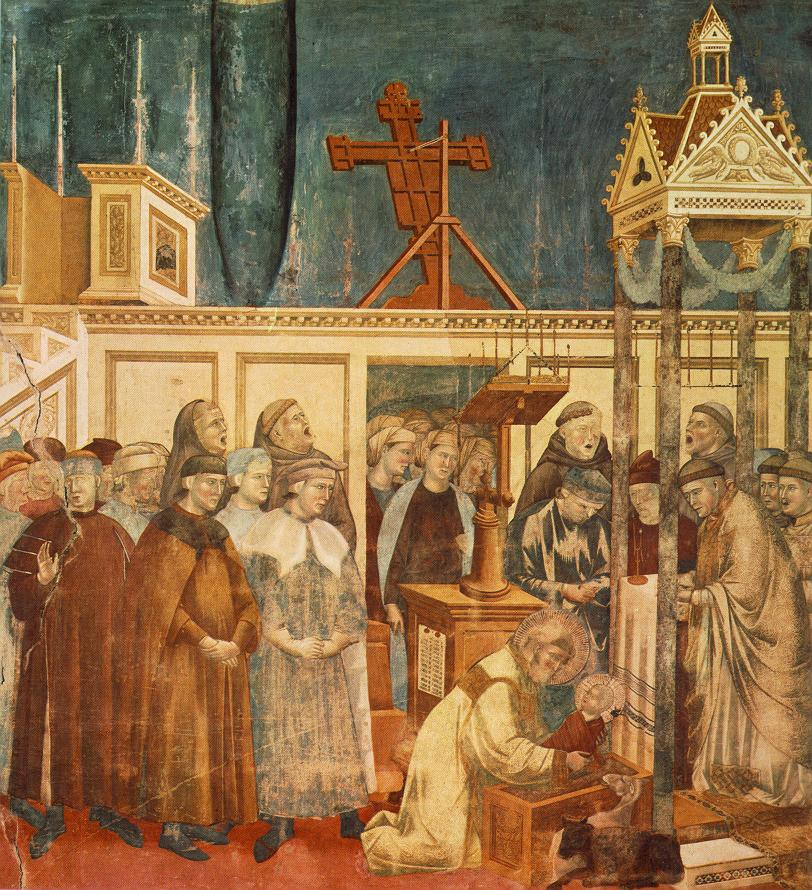
St. Francis at Greccio by Giotto, 1295

The tradition of the Nativity scene comes from Italy. One of the earliest representation in art of the nativity was found in the early Christian Roman catacomb of Saint Valentine. It dates to about AD 380. Another, of similar date, is beneath the pulpit in Sant'Ambrogio, Milan.

For the Christian celebration of Christmas, the viewing of the Nativity play is one of the oldest Christmastime traditions, with the first reenactment of the Nativity of Jesus taking place in A.D. 1223 in the Italian town of Greccio. In that year, Francis of Assisi assembled a Nativity scene outside of his church in Italy and children sang Christmas carols celebrating the birth of Jesus.

Each year, this grew larger, and people travelled from afar to see Francis' depiction of the Nativity of Jesus that came to feature drama and music. Nativity plays eventually spread throughout all of Europe, where they remained popular. Christmas Eve and Christmas Day church services often came to feature Nativity plays, as did schools and theatres. In France, Germany, Mexico, and Spain, Nativity plays are often reenacted outdoors in the streets.

=== Christmas lights ===
Many families have been decorating their houses with lights and in modern times, inflatables, to create a festive environment. The origin of Christmas lights began with candles on Christmas trees in 16th-century Germany, where they symbolized Christ as the light of the world.

=== Music and carols ===
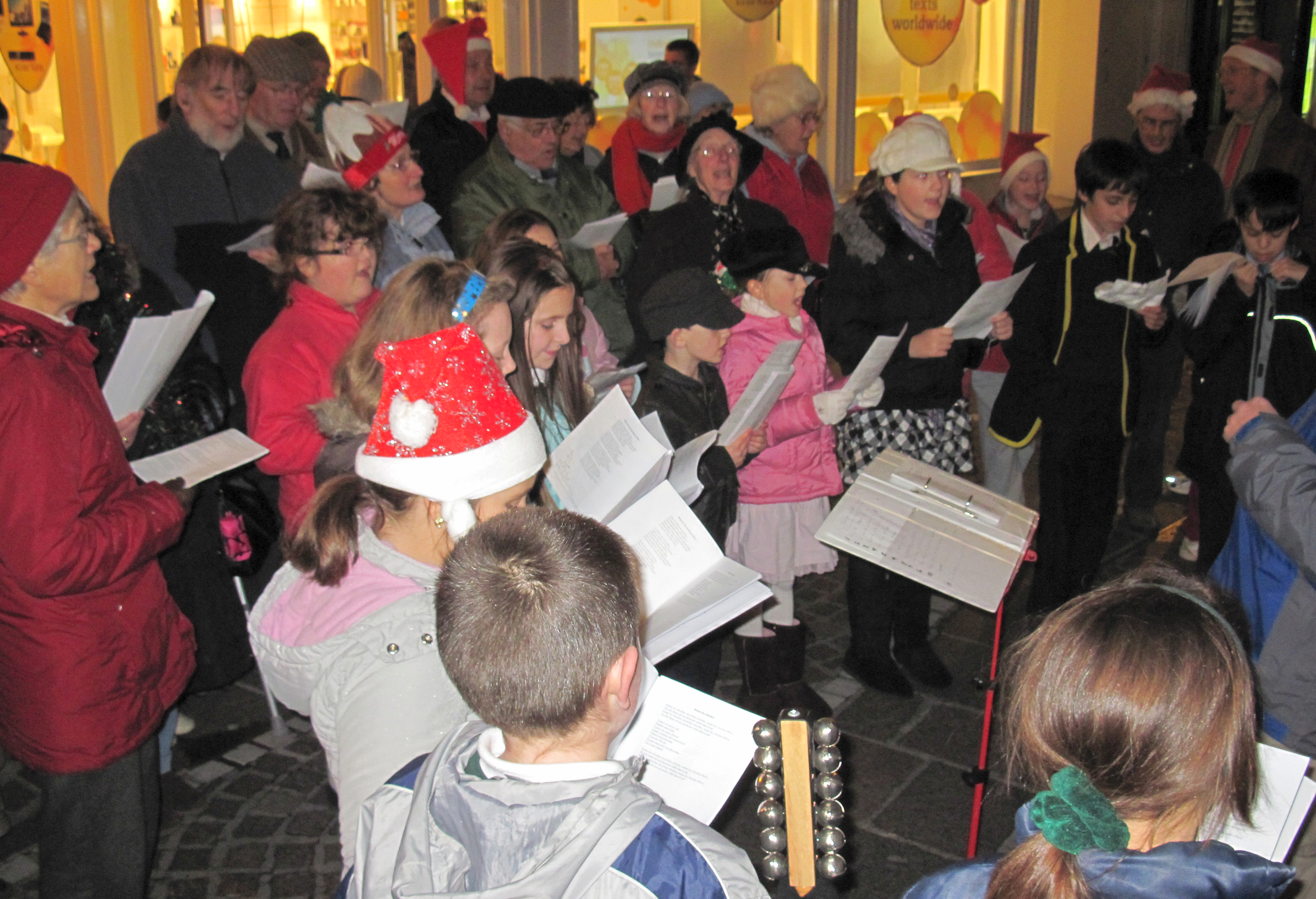
Christmas carolers in Jersey

The earliest extant specifically Christmas hymns appear in fourth-century Rome. Latin hymns such as "Veni redemptor gentium", written by Ambrose, Archbishop of Milan, were austere statements of the theological doctrine of the Incarnation in opposition to Arianism. "Corde natus ex Parentis" ("Of the Father's love begotten") by the Spanish poet Prudentius (died 413) is still sung in some churches today. In the 9th and 10th centuries, the Christmas "Sequence" or "Prose" was introduced in North European monasteries, developing under Bernard of Clairvaux into a sequence of rhymed stanzas. In the 12th century the Parisian monk Adam of St. Victor began to derive music from popular songs, introducing something closer to the traditional Christmas carol. Christmas carols in English appear in a 1426 work of John Awdlay who lists twenty five "caroles of Cristemas", probably sung by groups of 'wassailers', who went from house to house.

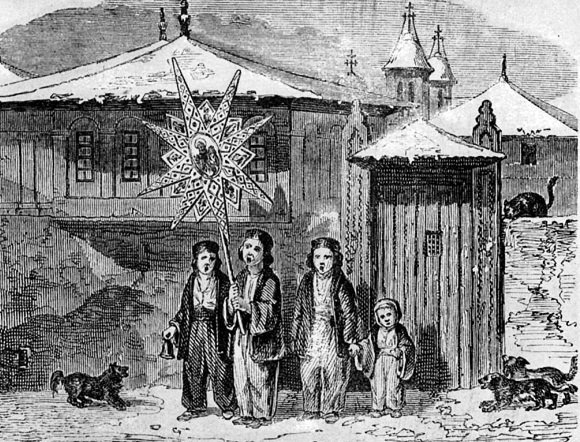
Child singers in Bucharest, 1841

The songs now known specifically as carols were originally communal folk songs sung during celebrations such as "harvest tide" as well as Christmas. It was only later that carols began to be sung in church. Traditionally, carols have often been based on medieval chord patterns, and it is this that gives them their uniquely characteristic musical sound. Some carols like "Personent hodie", "Good King Wenceslas", and "In dulci jubilo" can be traced directly back to the Middle Ages. They are among the oldest musical compositions still regularly sung. "Adeste Fideles" (O Come all ye faithful) appeared in its current form in the mid-18th century.

The singing of carols increased in popularity after the Protestant Reformation in the Lutheran areas of Europe, as the Reformer Martin Luther wrote carols and encouraged their use in worship, in addition to spearheading the practice of caroling outside the Mass. The 18th-century English reformer Charles Wesley, a founder of Methodism, understood the importance of music to Christian worship. In addition to setting many psalms to melodies, he wrote texts for at least three Christmas carols. The best known was originally entitled "Hark! How All the Welkin Rings", later renamed "Hark! The Herald Angels Sing".

Hark! The Herald Angels Sing
Performed by the U.S. Army Band Chorus

Christmas seasonal songs of a secular nature emerged in the late 18th century. The Welsh melody for "Deck the Halls" dates from 1794, with the lyrics added by Scottish musician Thomas Oliphant in 1862, and the American "Jingle Bells" was copyrighted in 1857. Other popular carols include "The First Noel", "God Rest Ye Merry, Gentlemen", "The Holly and the Ivy", "I Saw Three Ships", "In the Bleak Midwinter", "Joy to the World", "Once in Royal David's City" and "While Shepherds Watched Their Flocks". In the 19th and 20th centuries, African American spirituals and songs about Christmas, based in their tradition of spirituals, became more widely known. An increasing number of seasonal holiday songs were commercially produced in the 20th century, including jazz and blues variations. In addition, there was a revival of interest in early music, from groups singing folk music, such as The Revels, to performers of early medieval and classical music.

One of the most ubiquitous festive songs is "We Wish You a Merry Christmas", which originates from the West Country of England in the 1930s. Radio has covered Christmas music from variety shows from the 1940s and 1950s, as well as modern-day stations that exclusively play Christmas music from late November through December 25. Hollywood movies have featured new Christmas music, such as "White Christmas" in Holiday Inn and Rudolph the Red-Nosed Reindeer. Traditional carols have also been included in Hollywood films, such as "Hark! The Herald Angels Sing" in It's a Wonderful Life (1946), and "Silent Night" in A Christmas Story.

=== Traditional cuisine ===
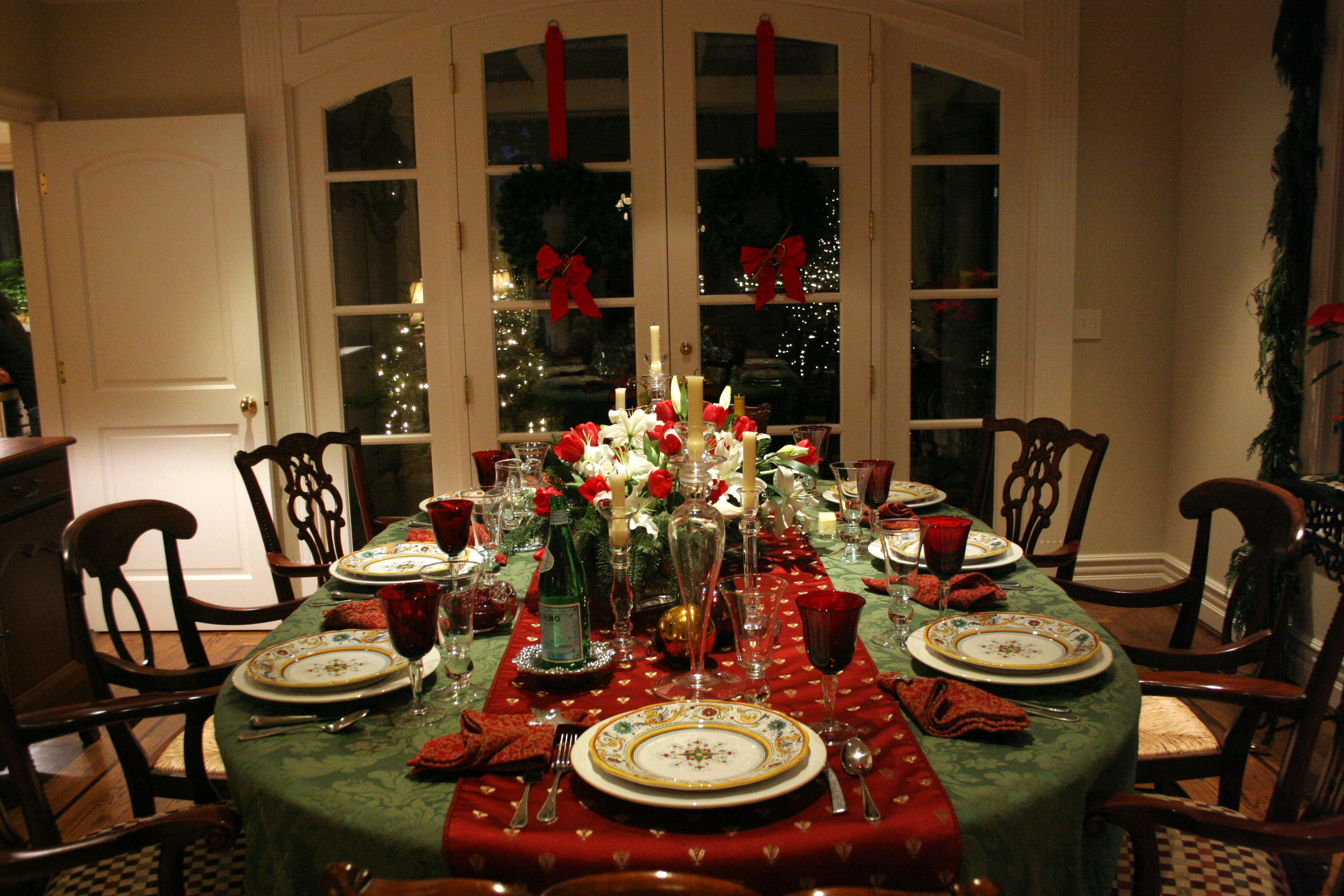
Christmas dinner setting

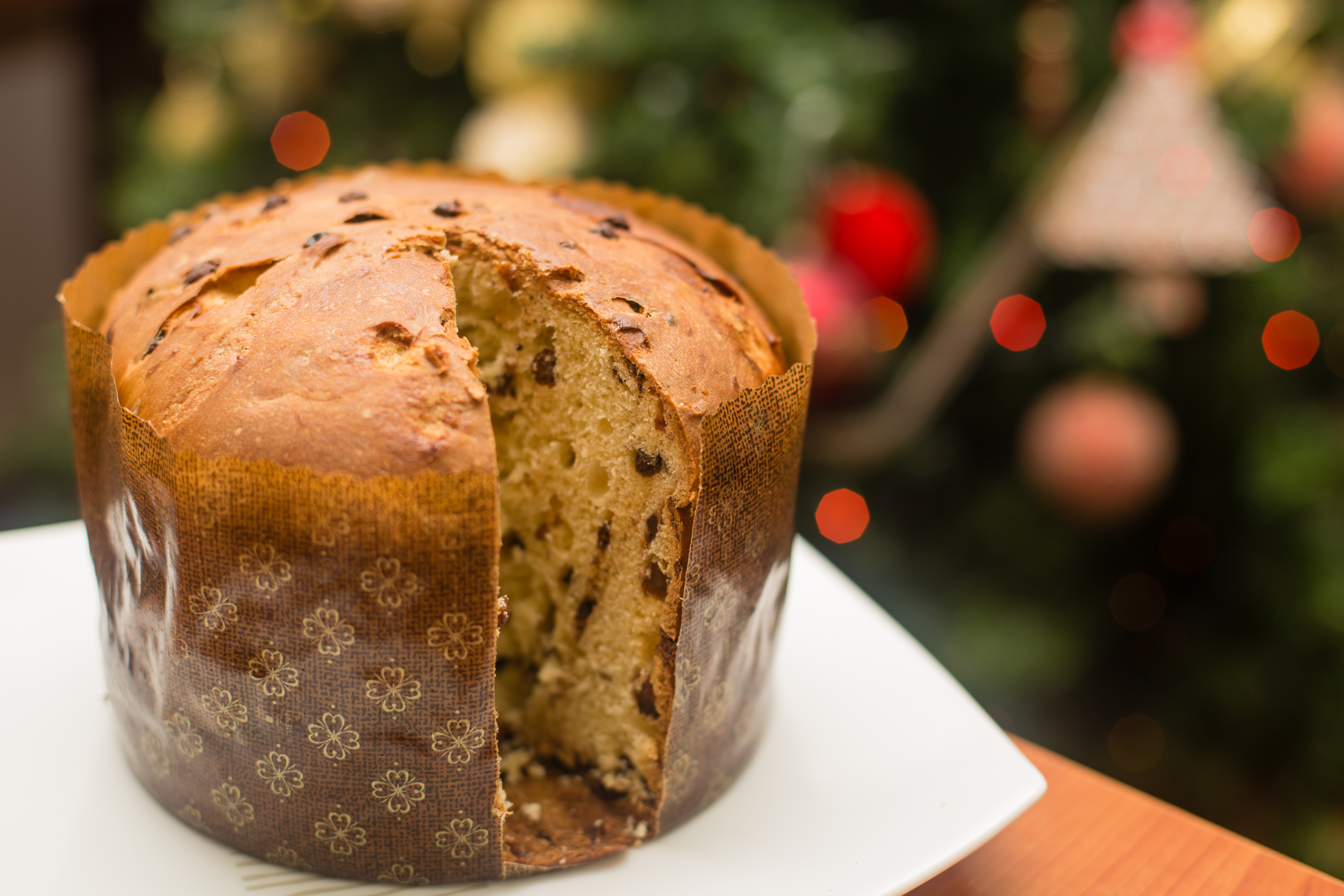
Panettone

A special Christmas family meal is traditionally an important part of the holiday's celebration, and the food served varies greatly from country to country. Some regions have special meals for Christmas Eve, such as Sicily, where 12 kinds of fish are served. In the United Kingdom and countries influenced by its traditions, a standard Christmas meal includes turkey, goose or other large bird, gravy, potatoes, vegetables, sometimes bread, cider, and, in more recent decades, nut roast. Special desserts are also prepared, such as Christmas pudding, mince pies, fruit cake and Yule log cake.

In Poland and Scandinavia, fish is often used for the traditional main course, but richer meat such as lamb is increasingly served. In Sweden, it is common with a special variety of smörgåsbord, where ham, meatballs, and herring play a prominent role. In Germany, France, and Austria, goose and pork are favored. Beef, ham, and chicken in various recipes are popular worldwide. The Maltese traditionally serve Imbuljuta tal-Qastan, a chocolate and chestnuts beverage, after Midnight Mass and throughout the Christmas season. Slovenes prepare the traditional Christmas bread potica, bûche de Noël in France, panettone in Italy, and elaborate tarts and cakes. Panettone, an Italian type of sweet bread and fruitcake, originally from Milan, Italy, usually prepared and enjoyed for Christmas and New Year in Western, Southern, and Southeastern Europe, as well as in South America, Eritrea, Australia and North America.

The eating of sweets and chocolates has become popular worldwide, and sweeter Christmas delicacies include the German stollen, marzipan cake or candy, and Jamaican rum fruit cake. As one of the few fruits traditionally available to northern countries in winter, oranges have been long associated with special Christmas foods. Eggnog is a sweetened dairy-based beverage traditionally made with milk, cream, sugar, and whipped eggs (which gives it a frothy texture). Spirits such as brandy, rum, or bourbon are often added. The finished serving is often garnished with a sprinkling of ground cinnamon or nutmeg.

=== Cards ===
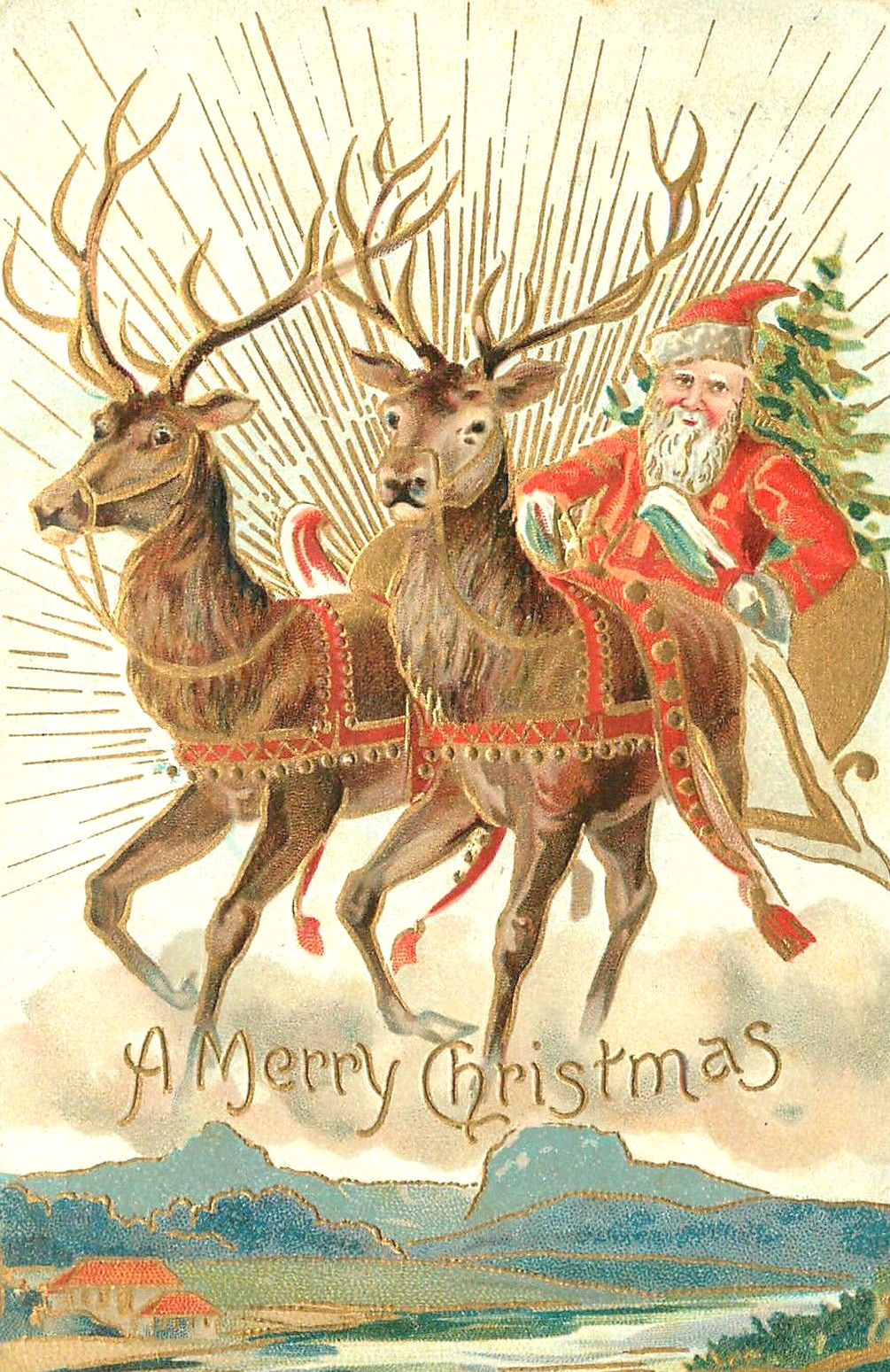
A 1907 Christmas card with Santa and some of his reindeer

Christmas cards are illustrated messages of greeting exchanged between friends and family members during the weeks preceding Christmas Day. The traditional greeting reads "wishing you a Merry Christmas and a Happy New Year", much like that of the first commercial Christmas card, produced by Sir Henry Cole in London in 1843. The custom of sending them has become popular among a wide cross-section of people with the emergence of the modern trend towards exchanging E-cards.

Christmas cards are purchased in considerable quantities and feature artwork, commercially designed and relevant to the season. The content of the design might relate directly to the Christmas narrative, with depictions of the Nativity of Jesus, or Christian symbols such as the Star of Bethlehem, or a white dove, which can represent both the Holy Spirit and Peace on Earth. Other Christmas cards are more secular and can depict Christmas traditions, figures such as Santa Claus, objects directly associated with Christmas such as candles, holly, and baubles, or a variety of images associated with the season, such as Christmastide activities, snow scenes, and the wildlife of the northern winter.

=== Commemorative stamps ===
A number of nations have issued commemorative stamps at Christmastide. Postal customers will often use these stamps to mail Christmas cards, and they are popular with philatelists. These stamps are regular postage stamps, unlike Christmas seals, and are valid for postage year-round. They usually go on sale sometime between early October and early December and are printed in considerable quantities.

=== Christmas seals ===
Christmas seals were first issued to raise funding to fight and bring awareness to tuberculosis. The first Christmas seal was issued in Denmark in 1904, and since then other countries have issued their own Christmas seals.

=== Gift giving ===
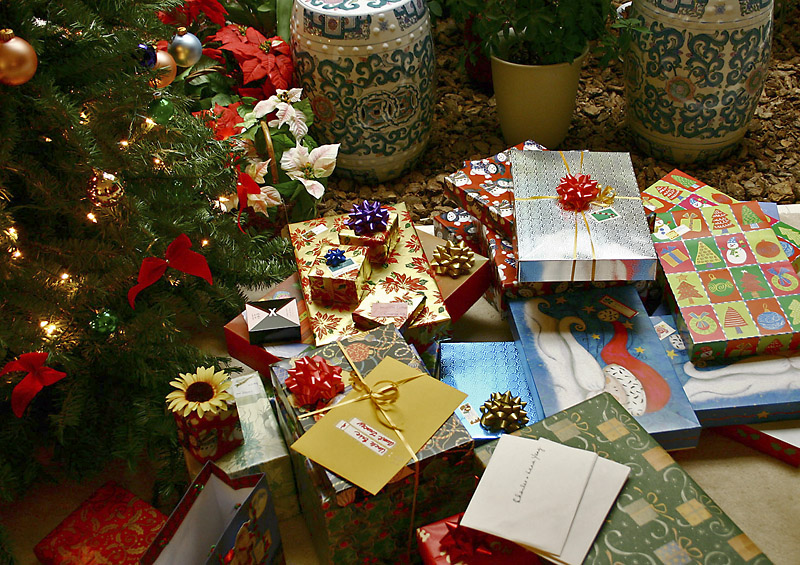
Christmas gifts under a Christmas tree

The exchanging of gifts is one of the core aspects of the modern Christmas celebration, making it the most profitable time of year for retailers and businesses throughout the world. On Christmas, people exchange gifts based on the Christian tradition associated with Saint Nicholas, and the gifts of gold, frankincense, and myrrh which were given to the baby Jesus by the Magi. The practice of gift giving in the Roman celebration of Saturnalia may have influenced Christian customs, but on the other hand the Christian "core dogma of the Incarnation, however, solidly established the giving and receiving of gifts as the structural principle of that recurrent yet unique event", because it was the Biblical Magi, "together with all their fellow men, who received the gift of God through man's renewed participation in the divine life". However, Thomas J. Talley holds that the Roman Emperor Aurelian placed the alternate festival on December 25 in order to compete with the growing rate of the Christian Church, which had already been celebrating Christmas on that date first.

==== Gift-bearing figures ====
A number of figures are associated with Christmas and the seasonal giving of gifts. Among these are Father Christmas, also known as Santa Claus (derived from the Dutch for Saint Nicholas), Père Noël, and the Weihnachtsmann; Saint Nicholas or Sinterklaas; the Christkind; Kris Kringle; Joulupukki; tomte/nisse; Babbo Natale; Saint Basil; and Ded Moroz. The Scandinavian tomte (also called nisse) is sometimes depicted as a gnome instead of Santa Claus.

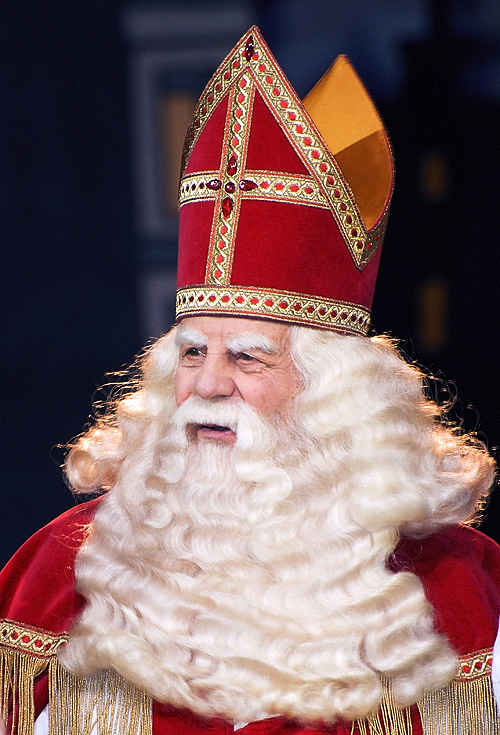
Saint Nicholas, known as Sinterklaas in the Netherlands, is considered by many to be the original Santa Claus.

The best known of these figures today is the red-dressed Santa Claus, of diverse origins. The name 'Santa Claus' can be traced back to the Dutch Sinterklaas ('Saint Nicholas'). Nicholas was a 4th-century Greek bishop of Myra. Among other saintly attributes, he was noted for the care of children, generosity, and the giving of gifts. His feast day, December 6, came to be celebrated in many countries with the giving of gifts.

Saint Nicholas traditionally appeared in bishop's attire, accompanied by helpers, inquiring about the behaviour of children during the past year before deciding whether they deserved a gift or not. By the 13th century, Saint Nicholas was well known in the Netherlands, and the practice of gift-giving in his name spread to other parts of central and southern Europe. At the Reformation in 16th- and 17th-century Europe, many Protestants changed the gift bringer to the Christ Child or Christkindl, corrupted in English to 'Kris Kringle', and the date of giving gifts changed from December 6 to Christmas Eve.

The modern popular image of Santa Claus, however, was created in the United States, and in particular in New York. The transformation was accomplished with the aid of notable contributors including Washington Irving and the German-American cartoonist Thomas Nast (1840–1902). Following the American Revolutionary War, some of the inhabitants of New York City sought out symbols of the city's non-English past. New York had originally been established as the Dutch colonial town of New Amsterdam and the Dutch Sinterklaas tradition was reinvented as Saint Nicholas.

Current tradition in several Latin American countries holds that while Santa makes the toys, he then gives them to the Baby Jesus, who is the one who actually delivers them to the children's homes, a reconciliation between traditional religious beliefs and the iconography of Santa Claus imported from the United States.

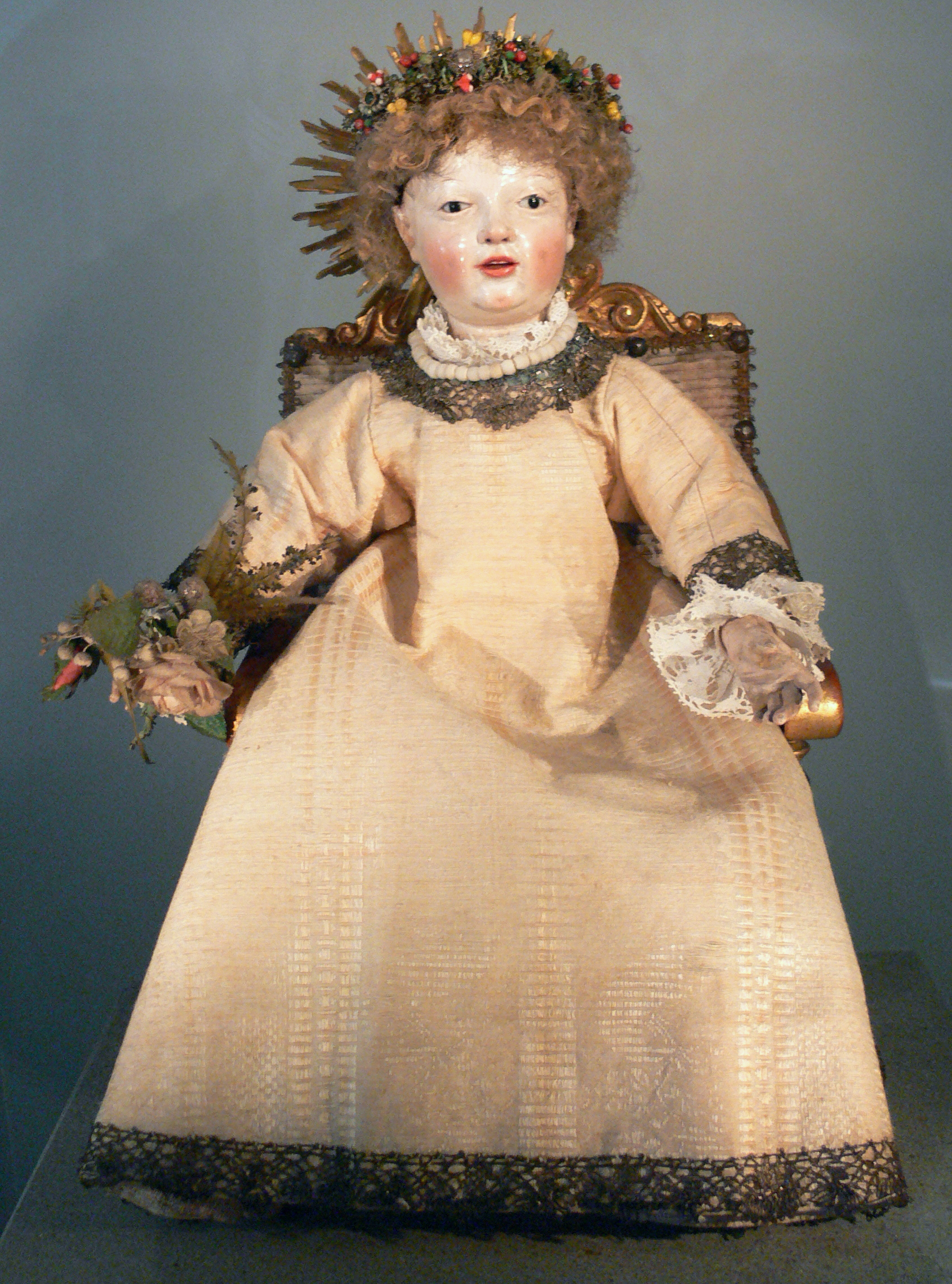
Christkind, Munich, Germany

In Italy's South Tyrol, Austria, the Czech Republic, Southern Germany, Hungary, Liechtenstein, Slovakia, and Switzerland, the Christkind (Ježíšek in Czech, Jézuska in Hungarian and Ježiško in Slovak) brings the presents. Greek children get their presents from Saint Basil on New Year's Eve, the eve of that saint's liturgical feast. The German St. Nikolaus is not identical with the Weihnachtsmann (who is the German version of Santa Claus / Father Christmas). St. Nikolaus wears a bishop's dress and still brings small gifts (usually candies, nuts, and fruits) on December 6 and is accompanied by Knecht Ruprecht. Although many parents around the world routinely teach their children about Santa Claus and other gift bringers, some have come to reject this practice, considering it deceptive.

Multiple gift-giver figures exist in Poland, varying between regions and individual families. St Nicholas (Święty Mikołaj) dominates Central and North-East areas, the Starman (Gwiazdor) is most common in Greater Poland, Baby Jesus (Dzieciątko) is unique to Upper Silesia, with the Little Star (Gwiazdka) and the Little Angel (Aniołek) being common in the South and the South-East. Grandfather Frost (Dziadek Mróz) is less commonly accepted in some areas of Eastern Poland. It is worth noting that across all of Poland, St Nicholas is the gift giver on Saint Nicholas Day on December 6.

=== Sport ===
Christmas during the Middle Ages was a public festival with annual indulgences, including sporting. When Puritans outlawed Christmas in England in December 1647 the crowd brought out footballs as a symbol of festive misrule. The Orkney Christmas Day Ba' tradition continues. In the former top tier of English football, home and away Christmas Day and Boxing Day double headers were often played guaranteeing football clubs large crowds by allowing many working people their only chance to watch a game. Champions Preston North End faced Aston Villa on Christmas Day 1889 and the last December 25 fixture was in 1965 in England, Blackpool beating Blackburn Rovers 4–2. One of the most memorable images of the Christmas truce during World War I was the games of football played between the opposing sides on Christmas Day 1914.

== Choice of date ==
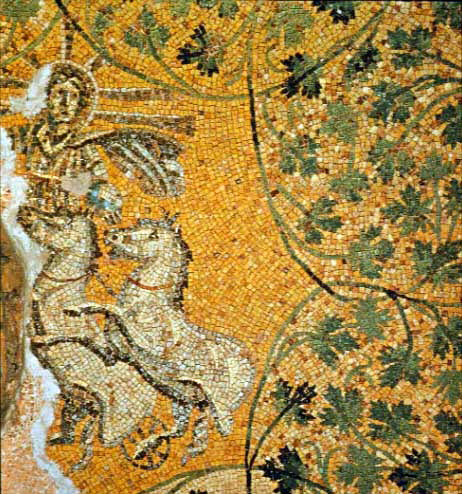
A mosaic dated to around 300 AD in the Tomb of the Julii, an apparently Christian tomb in the Vatican Necropolis. Most scholars believe it depicts Jesus as the sun god Sol / Helios.

=== Theories ===
There are several theories as to why December 25 was chosen as the date for Christmas. However, according to theology professor Susan Roll, liturgical historians agree that it was linked in some way with "the sun, the winter solstice and the popularity of solar worship in the later Roman Empire". In Roman tradition, December 25 was deemed to be the winter solstice and March 25 the spring equinox, dates that retained significance despite Julian calendar drift. Greco-Roman writers in the second and third centuries called December 25 the birth day of the Sun. The early Church linked Jesus to the Sun and referred to him as the 'true Sun' or 'Sun of Righteousness'. In the early fifth century, Augustine of Hippo and Maximus of Turin preached that it was fitting to celebrate Christ's birth at the winter solstice, because it marked the point when the hours of daylight begin to grow. The use of solar imagery for Christ is understood as part of broader cosmological symbolism in late antiquity, and may not have been direct cultic borrowing.

The 'history of religions' or 'substitution' theory proposes that the Church chose December 25 as Christ's birthday (dies Natalis Christi) to appropriate the Roman winter solstice festival dies Natalis Solis Invicti, the birthday of the god Sol Invictus (the 'Invincible Sun'). It had been held on this date since 274 AD; before the earliest evidence of Christmas on December 25. Professor Gary Forsythe says that the Natalis Solis Invicti followed "the seven-day period of the Saturnalia (December 17–23), Rome's most joyous holiday season since Republican times, characterized by parties, banquets, and exchanges of gifts". Roll says that "the specific nature of the relation" between Christmas and the Natalis Solis Invicti has not yet been "conclusively proven from extant texts".

The 'calculation theory' proposes that the date arose from Christian chronography rather than from an effort to supplant a pagan festival. It was first proposed by Louis Duchesne. Some early Christians marked Jesus's death on the day before Passover, the 14th of Nisan. Several third‑century sources correlate this with the spring equinox on March 25. Duchesne conjectured that early Christians believed Jesus was conceived and died on the same date, yielding a March 25 conception and December 25 birth nine months later. However, he admitted that this belief is not found in any early Christian text. The earliest attestation of a December 25 Nativity may be contemporaneous with or earlier than clear attestations of a December 25 Sol Invictus festival.

=== Date according to Julian calendar ===
Some jurisdictions of the Eastern Orthodox Church, including those of Russia, Georgia, North Macedonia, Montenegro, Serbia, and Jerusalem, mark feasts using the older Julian calendar. There is a difference of 13 days between the Julian calendar and the modern Gregorian calendar. As a result, December 25 on the Julian calendar currently corresponds to January 7 on the calendar used by most governments and people in everyday life. Therefore, the aforementioned Orthodox Christians mark December 25 (and thus Christmas) on the day that is internationally considered to be January 7.

Conversely, following the Council of Constantinople in 1923, other Orthodox Christians, such as those belonging to the jurisdictions of Constantinople, Bulgaria, Greece, Romania, Antioch, Alexandria, Albania, Cyprus, Finland, and the Orthodox Church in America, among others, began using the Revised Julian calendar, which at present corresponds exactly to the Gregorian calendar. Therefore, these Orthodox Christians mark December 25 (and thus Christmas) on the same day that is internationally considered to be December 25, the same day as is considered to be December 12 according to the Julian calendar.

The Armenian Apostolic Church continues the original ancient Eastern Christian practice of celebrating the birth of Christ not as a separate holiday, but on the same day as the celebration of his baptism (Theophany), which is on January 6 in both calendars. This is a public holiday in Armenia, and it is held on the same day that is internationally considered to be January 6, because since 1923 the Armenian Church in Armenia has used the Gregorian calendar. However, there is also a small Armenian Patriarchate of Jerusalem, which maintains the traditional Armenian custom of celebrating the birth of Christ on the same day as Theophany (January 6), but uses the Julian calendar for the determination of that date. As a result, this church celebrates "Christmas" (more properly called Theophany) on the day that is considered January 19 on the Gregorian calendar in use by the majority of the world.

Following the 2022 Russian invasion of Ukraine, Ukraine officially moved its Christmas date from January 7 to December 25, to distance itself from the Russian Orthodox Church that had supported Russia's invasion. This followed the Orthodox Church of Ukraine formally adopting the Revised Julian calendar for fixed feasts and solemnities.

=== Table of dates ===
There are four different dates used by different Christian groups to mark the birth of Christ, given in the table below.

Church or section	Calendar	Date	Gregorian date	Note
Armenian Patriarchate of Jerusalem	Julian calendar	January 6	January 19	Correspondence between Julian January 6 and Gregorian January 19 holds until 2100; in the following century the difference will be one day more.
Armenian Apostolic Church, Armenian Evangelical Church	Gregorian calendar	January 6	January 6	
Eastern Orthodox Church jurisdictions, including those of Constantinople, Bulgaria, Ukraine (state holiday, Orthodox and Greek Catholic), Greece, Romania, Moldova (Metropolis of Bessarabia), Antioch, Alexandria, Albania, Cyprus, Finland, the Orthodox Church in America. Also, the Ancient Church of the East, Syriac Orthodox Church, Indian Orthodox Church.	Revised Julian calendar	December 25	December 25	Revised Julian calendar was agreed at the 1923 Council of Constantinople. Although it follows the Julian calendar, the Ancient Church of the East decided on 2010 to celebrate Christmas according to the Gregorian calendar date.
Other Eastern Orthodox: Russia, Georgia, Ukrainian Orthodox Church (Moscow Patriarchate), North Macedonia, Belarus, Moldova (Metropolis of Chișinău and All Moldova), Montenegro, Serbia and Jerusalem. Also, some Byzantine Rite Catholics and Byzantine Rite Lutherans.	Julian calendar	December 25	January 7	Correspondence between Julian December 25 and Gregorian January 7 of the following year holds until 2100; from 2101 to 2199 the difference will be one day more.
Coptic Orthodox Church	Coptic calendar	Koiak 29 or 28 (December 25)	January 7	After the Coptic insertion of a leap day in what for the Julian calendar is August (September in Gregorian), Christmas is celebrated on Koiak 28 in order to maintain the exact interval of nine 30-day months and 5 days of the child's gestation.
Ethiopian Orthodox Tewahedo Church (sole date), Eritrean Orthodox Tewahedo Church (sole date), and P'ent'ay (Ethiopian-Eritrean Evangelical) churches (primary date)	Ethiopian calendar	Tahsas 29 or 28 (December 25)	January 7	Further information: Ethiopian Christmas After the Ethiopian and Eritrean insertion of a leap day in what for the Julian calendar is August (September in Gregorian), Christmas (also called Liddet or Gena, also Ledet or Genna) is celebrated on Tahsas 28 in order to maintain the exact interval of nine 30-day months and 5 days of the child's gestation. Most Protestants (P'ent'ay/Evangelicals) in the diaspora have the option of choosing the Ethiopian calendar (Tahsas 29/January 7) or the Gregorian calendar (December 25) for religious holidays, with this option being used when the corresponding eastern celebration is not a public holiday in the western world (with most diaspora Protestants celebrating both days).
Most Western Christian churches, most Eastern Catholic churches and civil calendars; also the Assyrian Church of the East.	Gregorian calendar	December 25	December 25	The Assyrian Church of the East adopted the Gregorian calendar in 1964.

== Economy ==
Christmas is typically a peak selling season for retailers in many nations around the world; sales increase dramatically during this time as people purchase gifts, decorations, and supplies to celebrate. In the United States, the "Christmas shopping season" starts as early as October. In Canada, merchants begin advertising campaigns before Halloween (October 31) and step up their marketing following Remembrance Day on November 11. In the UK and Ireland, the Christmas shopping season starts from mid-November, around the time when high street Christmas lights are turned on. A concept devised by retail entrepreneur David Lewis, the first Christmas grotto opened in Lewis's department store in Liverpool, England in 1879. In the United States, it has been calculated that a quarter of all personal spending takes place during the Christmas/holiday shopping season. Figures from the US Census Bureau reveal that expenditure in department stores nationwide rose from $20.8 billion in November 2004 to $31.9 billion in December 2004, an increase of 54 percent. In other sectors, the pre-Christmas increase in spending was even greater, there being a November–December buying surge of 100 percent in bookstores and 170 percent in jewelry stores. In the same year employment in American retail stores rose from 1.6 million to 1.8 million in the two months leading up to Christmas. Industries completely dependent on Christmas include Christmas cards, of which 1.9 billion are sent in the United States each year, and live Christmas trees, of which 20.8 million were cut in the US in 2002. In the UK in 2010, up to £8 billion was expected to be spent online at Christmas, approximately a quarter of total retail festive sales.

In most Western nations, Christmas Day is the least active day of the year for business and commerce; almost all retail, commercial and institutional businesses are closed, and almost all industries cease activity (more than any other day of the year), whether laws require such or not. In England and Wales, the Christmas Day (Trading) Act 2004 prevents all large shops from trading on Christmas Day. Similar legislation was approved in Scotland in 2007. Film studios release many high-budget movies during the holiday season, including Christmas films, fantasy movies or high-tone dramas with high production values to hopes of maximizing the chance of nominations for the Academy Awards.

One economist's analysis calculates that despite increased overall spending, Christmas is a deadweight loss under orthodox microeconomic theory, because of the effect of gift-giving. This loss is calculated as the difference between what the gift giver spent on the item and what the gift receiver would have paid for the item. It is estimated that in 2001, Christmas resulted in a $4 billion deadweight loss in the US alone. Because of complicating factors, this analysis is sometimes used to discuss possible flaws in current microeconomic theory. Other deadweight losses include the effects of Christmas on the environment and the fact that material gifts are often perceived as white elephants, imposing cost for upkeep and storage and contributing to clutter.

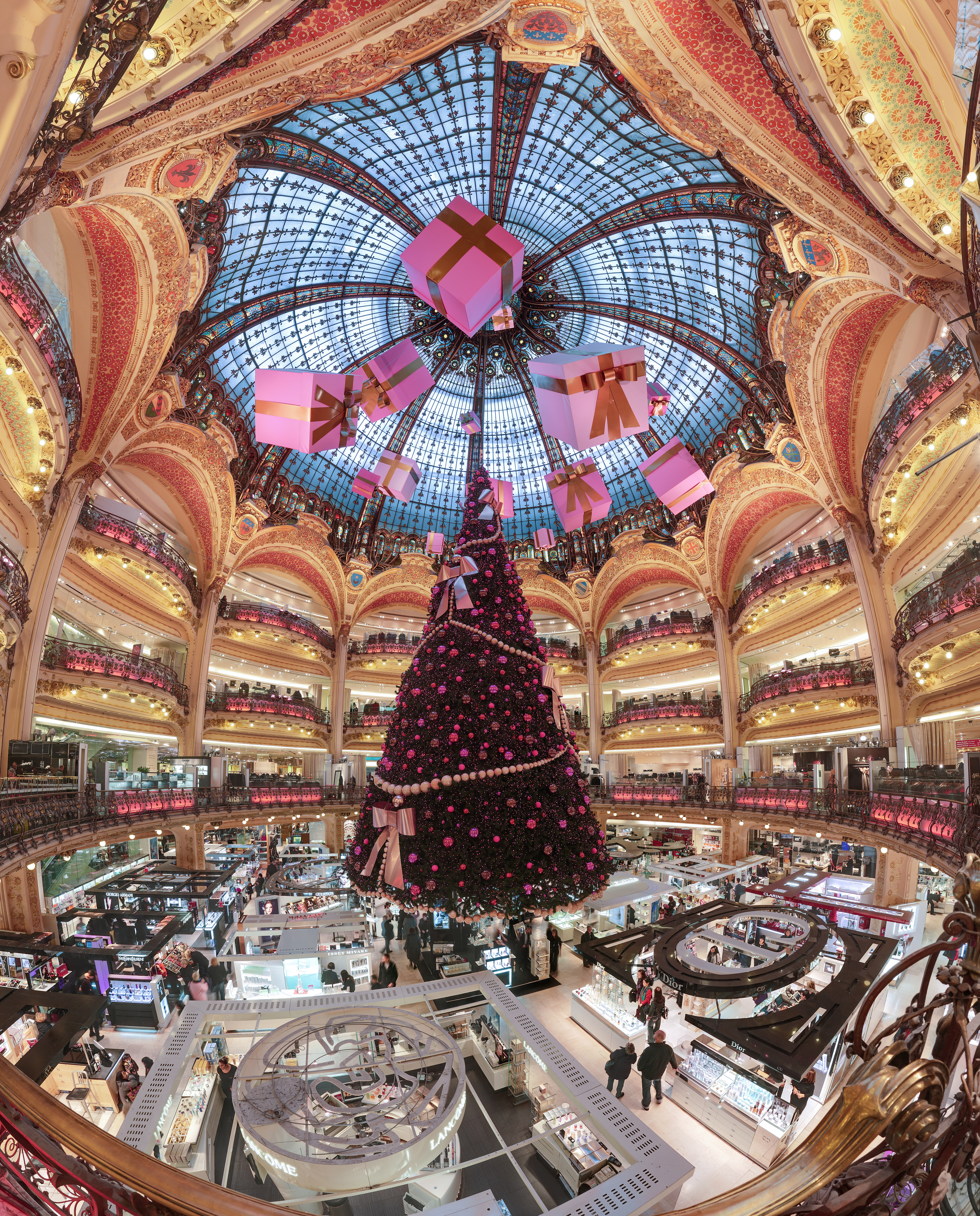
Christmas decorations at the Galeries Lafayette department store in Paris, France. The Christmas season is the busiest trading period for retailers.

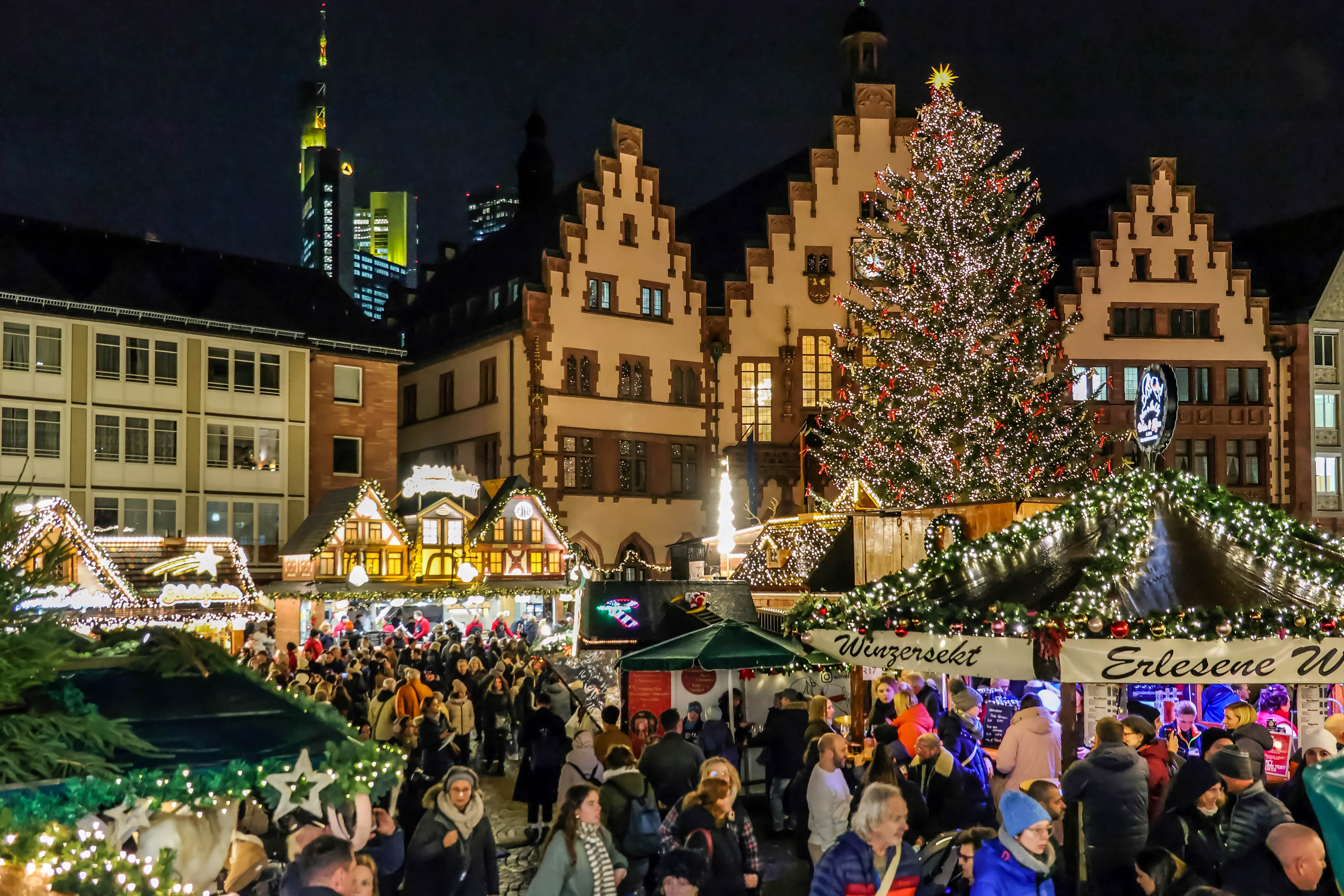
Christmas market in Frankfurt, Germany

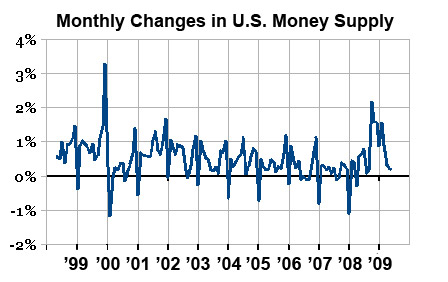
Each year (most notably 2000) money supply in US banks is increased for Christmas shopping.

== Prohibition ==
A 1931 edition of the Soviet magazine Bezbozhnik, published by the League of Militant Atheists, depicting an Orthodox Christian priest being forbidden to take home a tree for the celebration of Christmastide, which was banned under the Marxist–Leninist doctrine of state atheism

Christmas has been the subject of controversy and attacks from various sources, both Christian and non-Christian. Historically, it was prohibited by Puritans during their ascendency in the Commonwealth of England (1647–1660) and in Colonial New England where the Puritans outlawed the celebration of Christmas in 1659 on the grounds that Christmas was not mentioned in Scripture and therefore violated the regulative principle of worship. The Parliament of Scotland, which was dominated by Presbyterians, passed a series of acts outlawing the observance of Christmas between 1637 and 1690; Christmas Day did not become a public holiday in Scotland until 1871. Today, some conservative Reformed denominations such as the Free Presbyterian Church of Scotland and the Reformed Presbyterian Church of North America likewise reject the celebration of Christmas based on the regulative principle and what they see as its non-Scriptural origin. Celebrating Christmas is banned in the Jehovah's Witnesses, as the Governing Body believes that Christmas is originally pagan and without basis in Scripture. Christmas celebrations have also been prohibited by atheist states such as the Soviet Union and in 2015 by the majority Muslim states of Somalia, Tajikistan and Brunei.

As Christmas celebrations began to spread globally even outside traditional Christian cultures, several Muslim-majority countries began to ban the observance of Christmas, claiming it undermined Islam. In December 2018, the Iraqi Council of Ministers amended the national holidays law in order to designate Christmas Day (December 25) an official nationwide holiday which is to be celebrated by all Iraqis instead of only the country's Christian minority. In 2023, public Christmas celebrations were cancelled in Bethlehem, the city synonymous with the birth of Jesus. Palestinian leaders of various Christian denominations cited the ongoing Israel–Gaza war in their unanimous decision to cancel celebrations.

The government of the People's Republic of China officially espouses state atheism, and has conducted antireligious campaigns to this end. In December 2018, officials raided Christian churches prior to Christmastide and coerced them to close; Christmas trees and Santa Clauses were also forcibly removed.

== See also ==
- Apollo 8 Genesis reading from lunar orbit, December 24, 1968
- Christmas by medium – Christmas represented in different media
- Christmas in July – Second Christmas celebration
- Christmas Peace – Finnish tradition
- Christmas Sunday – Sunday after Christmas
- List of Christmas films
- List of Christmas novels – Christmas as depicted in literature
- Little Christmas – Alternative title for 6 January
- Mithraism in comparison with other belief systems#December 25
- Nochebuena – Evening or day before Christmas Day
