= Imbuljuta tal-Qastan =

Maltese drink

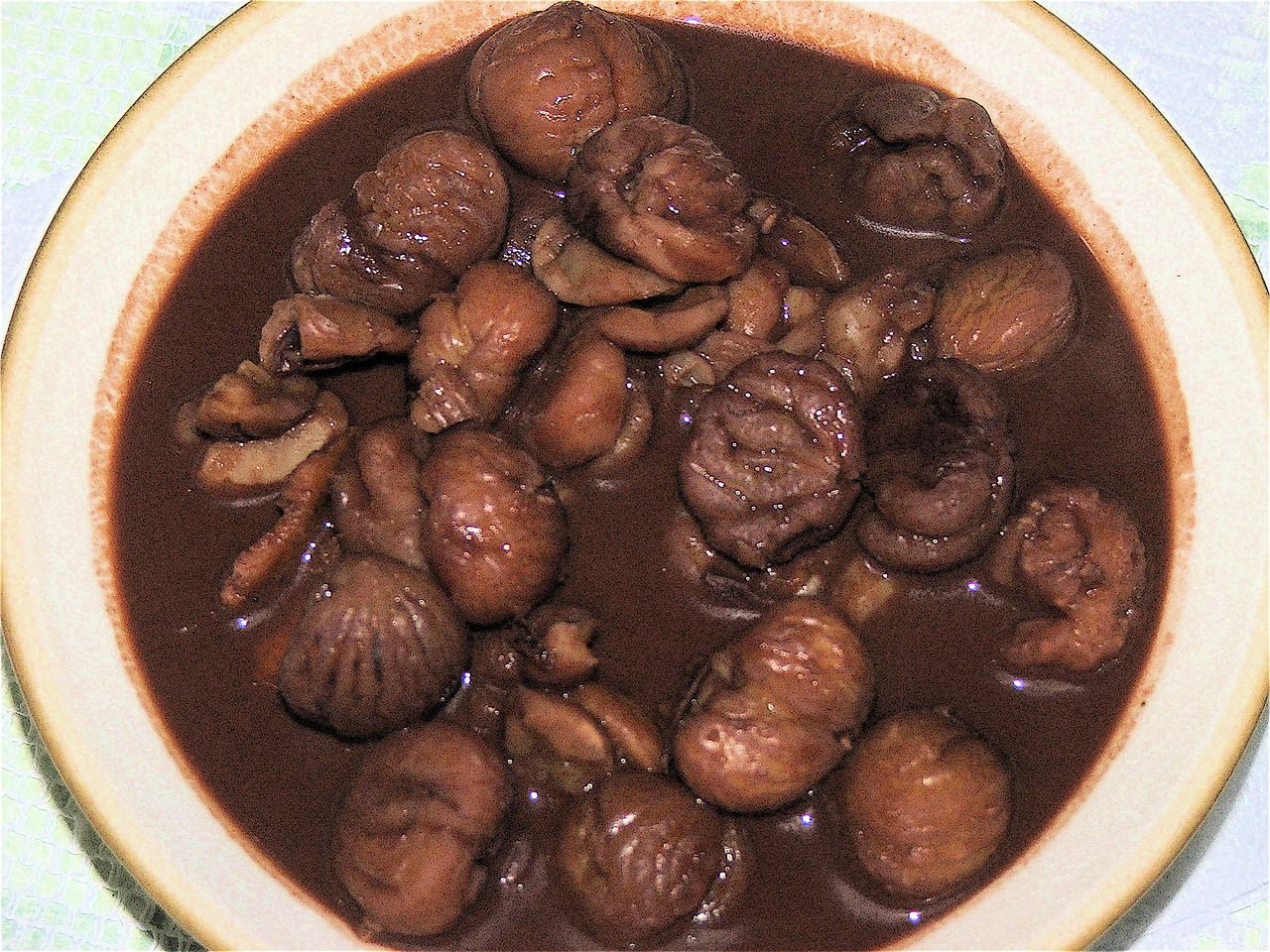
Imbuljuta

Imbuljuta tal-Qastan is a traditional Maltese drink served after Midnight Mass and on Christmas Eve. It is made using water, cocoa, sugar, chestnuts, cloves and citrus zest. It may also include chocolate.
