= Little Christmas =

Alternative title for 6 January

- Also called: Ireland; Women's Christmas; Women's Little Christmas; Nollaig na mBan; Wee Christmas (in parts of Ulster only); Scotland; Là Challuinn; Là na Bliadhna Ùire; Other; Old Christmas; Armenian Christmas; Green Christmas; The Day of The Three Wise Men; Three Kings Day
- Observed by: Amish; Christians in Ireland and the Irish diaspora Appalachian Americans, Scottish Highlanders; Newfoundland and Labrador
- Type: Christian, Irish and Scottish
- Significance: visit of the Magi to Jesus, former date of Christmas
- Observances: religious services, gift giving, family gatherings, meeting friends
- Date: 6 January in Ireland, 1 January in the Scottish Highlands
- Related to: Christmas, Twelfth Night, Epiphany, Christmastide, Epiphanytide

Little Christmas (Irish: Nollaig na mBan, lit. 'Women's Christmas'), also known as Old Christmas, is one of the traditional names among Irish Christians and the Amish for 6 January, which is also known more widely as the Feast of the Epiphany, celebrated after the conclusion of the twelve days of Christmastide. Epiphany, observed on 6 January, is preceded by Twelfth Night (Epiphany Eve) on 5 January. Believers prepare for Old Christmas through fasting, which is opened on Old Christmas through the consumption of Christmas dinner. The emphasis of Old Christmas celebrations is on reflecting on the birth of Jesus through attending church services and visiting with family. Popular Little Christmas customs include burning Christmas candles, singing Christmas carols, Epiphany singing, chalking the door, and having one's house blessed.

== Origins ==
Owing to differences in liturgical calendars, as early as the fourth century, the churches of the eastern Roman Empire were celebrating Christmas on 6 January, while those of the western Roman Empire were celebrating it on 25 December.

In October 1582, Pope Gregory XIII introduced the Gregorian calendar as a correction of the Julian calendar, because the latter has too many leap years that cause it to drift out of alignment with the solar year. This has liturgical significance since calculation of the date of Easter assumes that spring Equinox in the Northern Hemisphere occurs on 21 March. To correct the accumulated error, he ordained the date be advanced by ten days. Most Roman Catholic countries adopted the new calendar immediately and Protestant countries followed suit over the following 200 years. In particular, the British Empire (including the American colonies) did so from 1752 with the Calendar (New Style) Act 1750, by which time the divergence had grown to eleven days. (Note: 1600 was a leap year in both calendars, being divisible by 400, but 1700 was a leap year only in the Julian calendar.) This meant that Christmas Day on 25 December ('New Style') was eleven days earlier than it would have been but for the Act, making "Old Christmas" [25 December ('Old Style')] happen on 5 January (NS). In February 1800, the Julian calendar had another leap year but the Gregorian did not, moving Old Christmas to 6 January (NS), which coincided with the Feast of the Epiphany. (Note: until 1900, when there was another leap day in the Julian calendar but not the Gregorian. From then (until 2099), 25 December (Julian) corresponds to 7 January (Gregorian), which is Christmas Day for most Eastern Orthodox and Oriental Orthodox Christians.)

For this reason, in some parts of the world, the Feast of the Epiphany, which is traditionally observed on 6 January, is sometimes referred to as Old Christmas or Old Christmas Day. Although 1900 was also not a leap year in the Gregorian calendar (and thus the Julian 25 December has since that year coincided with 7 January in the Gregorian calendar) the custom of celebrating Little Christmas on 6 January did not change.

== Observance by country ==
=== Europe ===
In the Scottish Highlands the term Little Christmas (Scottish Gaelic: Nollaig Bheag) is applied to New Year's Day, also known as Là Challuinn, or Là na Bliadhna Ùire, while Epiphany is known as Là Féill nan Rìgh, the feast-day of the Kings. The Transalpine Redemptorists who live on Papa Stronsay in Scotland, celebrate 'Little Christmas' on the twenty-fifth day of every month, except for December, when the twenty-fifth day is celebrated as Christmas Day. The custom of blessing homes on Epiphany developed because the feast commemorates the time that the three kings visited the home of the Holy Family.

In the late 19th century, the day was also known as Little Christmas in some parts of England, such as Lancashire. In the Isle of Man, New Year's Day on 1 January was formerly called Laa Nolick beg in Manx, or Little Christmas Day, while 6 January was referred to as Old Christmas Day. The name Little Christmas is also found in other languages including Slovene (mali Božič), Galician (Nadalinho), and Ukrainian.

In Scandinavia, where the main celebration of Christmas is on Christmas Eve (24 December), the evening of 23 December is known as little Christmas Eve (Danish: lillejuleaften).

In some parts of the Spanish-speaking world, the emphasis of Christmas Day is on family dinner reunion and church attendance, while gifts are exchanged on the Feast of the Epiphany, when according to tradition the Three Wise Men (or Magi) brought gifts of gold, frankincense and myrrh to the Child Jesus. Tradition names them Melchior, Caspar and Balthazar. It is an important celebration in Spanish-speaking countries, mainly dedicated to children, who receive their gifts on the morning of 6 January. In some countries, like Spain, it is a public holiday that marks the end of the Christmas season which started on Christmas Eve (24 December).

In the Western Christian world, the two traditional days when Christmas decorations are removed are Twelfth Night (the night before the Feast of the Epiphany) and if they are not taken down on that day, Candlemas, the latter of which ends the Christmas-Epiphany season in some denominations.

==== Ireland: Nollaig na mBan, or Women's Christmas ====
In some parts of Ireland, Little Christmas is also called Nollaig na mBan (in Irish) or Women's Christmas (in English). The day is so called because, traditionally, men would take on what would have been seen as the traditional "female" household duties for the day, giving women the day off. Goose was the traditional meat served on Women's Christmas.

Women customarily hold parties or go out to socialise with their female friends and relatives on the day. As a result, parties of women and girls are common in bars and restaurants on the night. While the tradition had been dying off in some parts of the country, the hospitality industry now specifically advertises events aimed at those celebrating Nollaig na mBan. In 2024, a number of Nollaig na mBan events took place around the country: Dublin City Council held a Nollaig na mBan Festival celebrating the women of the inner city; the men of Trillick St Macartan's Gaelic Athletic Club in County Tyrone organised and served at a "thank you" high tea for the women in their lives; and over 2,400 women took part in sea swims around the country to raise funds for Women's Aid, a domestic violence charity.

In Ireland, it is the traditional day to remove the Christmas tree and decorations, as it is seen as bad luck to leave them in place past the twelfth day of Christmas. Until 2013, it was the last day of the Christmas holidays for both primary and secondary schools in Ireland.

=== North America ===
Some Anabaptists, such as the Amish and Mennonites, celebrate Christmas as a religious feast-day on 6 January. Believers prepare for Old Christmas through fasting, which is opened on Old Christmas through the consumption of Christmas dinner. The emphasis of Old Christmas celebrations is on reflecting on the birth of Jesus, as well as visiting with family and friends.

Celebration of Christmas Day on 6 January is reflected in the words of The Cherry-Tree Carol, an English folk-song that migrated to Appalachia in the Eastern United States. In his paper The Observance of Old Christmas in Southern Appalachia, C.R. Young writes 'sometime before the twentieth century, singers who may have been Appalachian residents turned the question which Mary asks of Jesus in regard to "what this world will be" into a query which Joseph puts to the unborn baby. Taking "Mary all on his left knee," he inquires when the birthday will be. Jesus responds:'

On the sixth day of January

My birthday shall be,
...
When the stars and the elements
Shall tremble with glee.

— Ritchie, Folk Songs of the Southern Appalachians as Sung by Jean Ritchie.

Young reports that "Bill 'Kitchen' Isom, an advocate of Old Christmas whose rendering of this carol Jean Thomas recorded in Carter County, Kentucky, gave the 'wind up of it' in these words:

'Twas on the sixth day of January

Angels did sing;
And the shepherds drew nigh
Their gifts for to bring.

— Thomas, Ballad Makin' in the Mountains of Kentucky.

The holiday was also recognized by certain Ozark communities,

"In some sections of Arkansas there are people who bury the entrails of a black hen under the hearth on "Old Christmas." This is said to protect the house against destruction by lightning or fire. [...] I know that some "peckerwood families" did bury chicken guts under their hearths as recently as 1935, not far from the enlightened metropolis of Hot Springs."

== Other meanings ==
A "Little Christmas" is also a figure in Irish set dancing. It refers to a figure where half the set, four dancers, join with hands linked behind partners lower back, and the whole figure proceeds to rotate in a clockwise motion, usually for eight bars. In the dance concerned, female participants enacted the traditional celebration's house visits and slightly subversive tone by taking the active "male" role of switching from partner to partner.

== See also ==
- Epiphany (holiday)
- Chalking the door
- House blessing#Christianity
- Pikkujoulu
