= Twelfth Night (holiday) =

Christian holiday

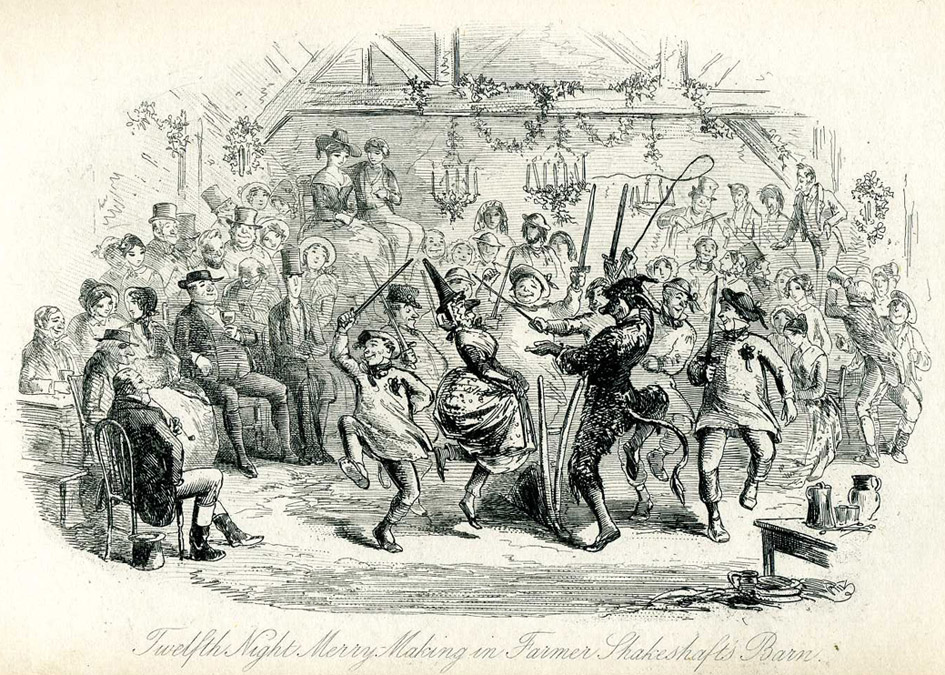
- Mervyn Clitheroe's Twelfth Night party, by "Phiz"
- Also called: Epiphany Eve
- Observed by: Christians, people living in culturally Christian countries
- Type: Christian, cultural
- Significance: evening prior to Epiphany
- Observances: Singing Christmas carols; chalking the door; merrymaking; having one's house blessed; attending church services; apple wassailing
- Date: 5, 6, or 17 January
- Frequency: annual
- Related to: Twelve Days of Christmas; Christmastide; Epiphany; Epiphanytide

Twelfth Night (also known as Epiphany Eve depending upon the tradition) is a Christian festival on the last night of the Twelve Days of Christmas, marking the end of Christmastide and the coming of the Epiphany. Different traditions mark the date of Twelfth Night as either 5 January or 6 January, depending on whether the counting begins on Christmas Day or 26 December. 6 January is celebrated as the feast of Epiphany, which begins the Epiphanytide season.

A superstition in English-speaking countries suggests it is unlucky to remove Christmas decorations before Twelfth Night (or to leave them up after Twelfth Night). (Note: The tradition of removing Christmas decorations on Twelfth Night has also been attached to Candlemas (which marks the end of Epiphanytide on 2 February), as well as the days of Good Friday, Shrove Tuesday, and Septuagesima.) Other popular customs include eating king cake, singing Christmas carols, chalking the door, having one's house blessed, merrymaking, and attending church services.

== Date ==
In many Western ecclesiastical traditions, such as the Lutheran and Anglican denominations of Christianity, Christmas Day is considered the "First Day of Christmas" and the Twelve Days are 25 December – 5 January, inclusive, making Twelfth Night on 5 January, which is Epiphany Eve. In some customs, the Twelve Days of Christmas are counted from sundown on the evening of 25 December until the morning of 6 January, meaning that the Twelfth Night falls on the evening of 5 January and the Twelfth Day falls on 6 January. However, in some church traditions only full days are counted, so that 5 January is counted as the Eleventh Day, 6 January as the Twelfth Day, and the evening of 6 January is counted as the Twelfth Night. In these traditions Twelfth Night is the same as Epiphany. However, some consider Twelfth Night to be the eve of the Twelfth Day (in the same way that Christmas Eve comes before Christmas), and thus consider Twelfth Night to be on 5 January. The difficulty may come from the use of the words eve, which is defined as "the day or evening before an event", however, especially in antiquated usage, it could mean simply "evening".

Bruce Forbes writes:

In 567 the Council of Tours proclaimed that the entire period between Christmas and Epiphany should be considered part of the celebration, creating what became known as the twelve days of Christmas, or what the English called Christmastide. On the last of the twelve days, called Twelfth Night, various cultures developed a wide range of additional special festivities. The variation extends even to the issue of how to count the days. If Christmas Day is the first of the twelve days, then Twelfth Night would be on January 5, the eve of Epiphany. If December 26, the day after Christmas, is the first day, then Twelfth Night falls on January 6, the evening of Epiphany itself.

The Church of England, Mother Church of the Anglican Communion, celebrates Twelfth Night on the 5th, and the term "refers to the night before Epiphany, the day when the nativity story tells us that the wise men visited the infant Jesus".

== Origins and history ==
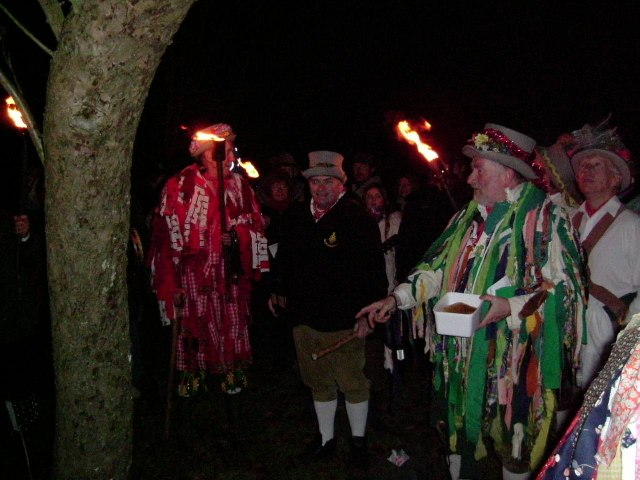
Wassailing apple trees on the Twelfth Night to ensure a good harvest. Photo taken in Maplehurst, West Sussex

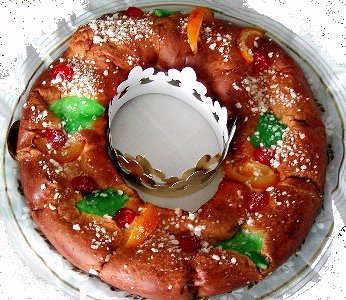
A Spanish Roscón de reyes, or Kings' ring. This pastry is just one of the many types baked around the world for celebrations during the Twelve Days of Christmas and Twelfth Night.

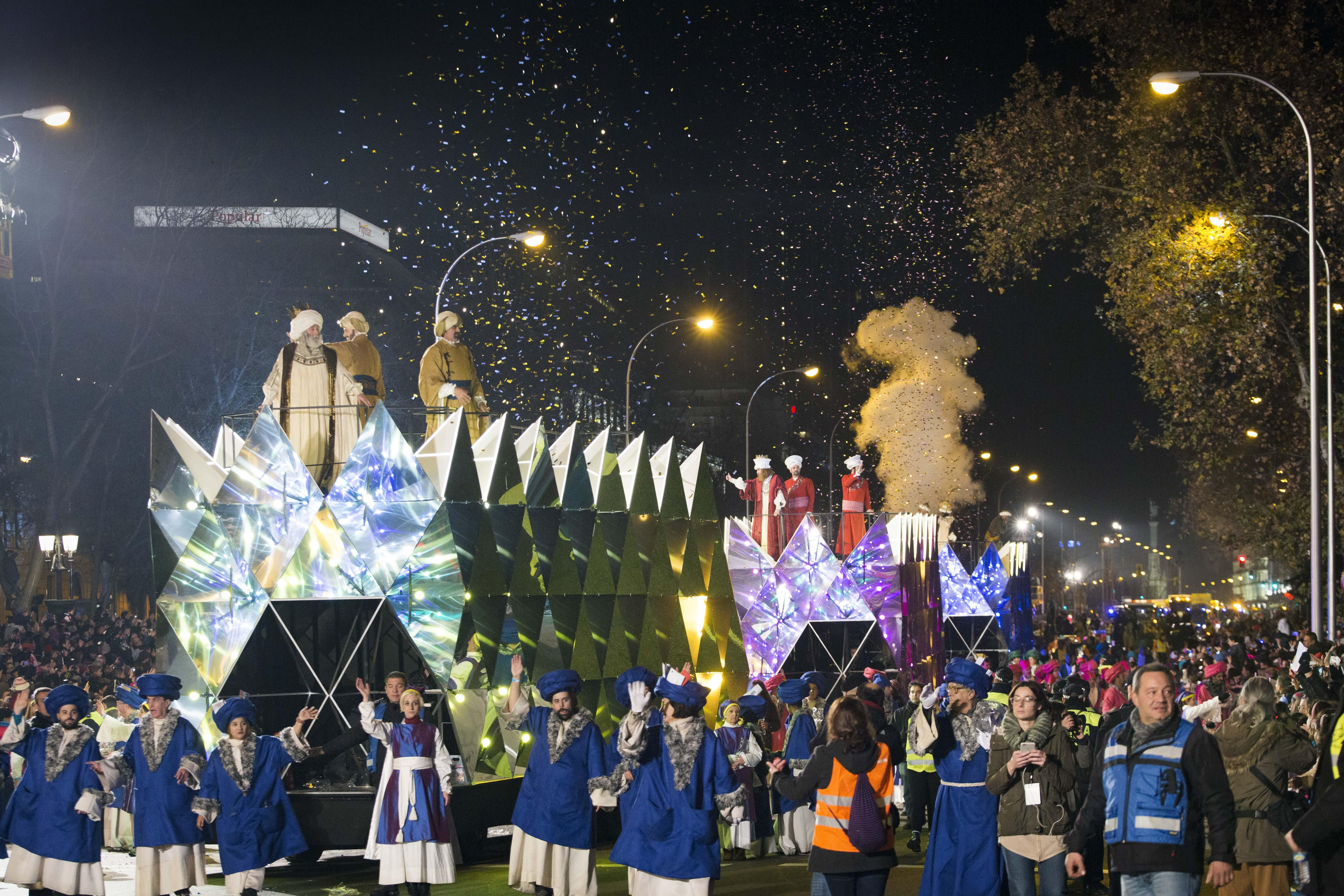
Cavalcade of Magi in Madrid

In AD 567, the Council of Tours "proclaimed the twelve days from Christmas to Epiphany as a sacred and festive season, and established the duty of Advent fasting in preparation for the feast." Christopher Hill, as well as William J. Federer, states that this was done to solve the "administrative problem for the Roman Empire as it tried to coordinate the solar Julian calendar with the lunar calendars of its provinces in the east."

In medieval and Tudor England, Candlemas traditionally marked the end of the Christmas season, although later, Twelfth Night came to signal the end of Christmastide, with a new but related season of Epiphanytide running until Candlemas. A popular Twelfth Night tradition was to have a bean and pea hidden inside a Twelfth-night cake; the "man who finds the bean in his slice of cake becomes King for the night while the lady who finds a pea in her slice of cake becomes Queen for the night." Following this selection, Twelfth Night parties would continue and would include the singing of Christmas carols, as well as feasting.

=== Traditions ===
Food and drink are the centre of the celebrations in modern times. All of the most traditional ones go back many centuries. The punch called wassail is consumed especially on Twelfth Night and throughout Christmas time, especially in the UK. Door-to-door wassailing (similar to singing Christmas carols) as well as orchard wassailing were both historically common in the UK and are still practiced to a certain extent today. Around the world, special pastries, such as the tortell and king cake, are baked on Twelfth Night, and eaten the following day for the Feast of the Epiphany celebrations.

In parts of Kent, there is a tradition that an edible decoration would be the last part of Christmas to be removed in the Twelfth Night and shared amongst the family.

The Theatre Royal, Drury Lane in London has had a tradition since 1795 of providing a cake for the company on Twelfth Night. The will of actor Robert Baddeley made a bequest of £100 to be invested in order to provide cake and punch for the company in residence at the theatre on 6 January for every year in perpetuity. The tradition has continued for over 200 years, with only a few years missed due to war, closing the theater for renovations, the COVID-19 pandemic, and, according to legend, a visiting troupe of French performers the fund declined to provide cake for.

In Ireland, it is still the tradition to place the statues of the Three Kings in the crib on the Twelfth Night or, at the latest, the following day, Little Christmas.

In colonial America, a Christmas wreath was always left up on the front door of each home. When taken down at the end of the Twelve Days of Christmas, any edible portions would be consumed with the other foods of the feast. The same held true in the 19th–20th centuries with fruits adorning Christmas trees. Fresh fruits were hard to come by and were therefore considered fine and proper gifts and decorations for the tree, wreaths, and home. Again, the tree would be taken down on the Twelfth Night, and such fruits, along with nuts and other local produce used, would then be consumed.

Modern American Carnival traditions are seen across former French colonies, most notably in New Orleans and Mobile. In the mid-twentieth century, friends gathered for weekly king cake parties. Whoever got the slice with the "king", usually in the form of a miniature baby doll (symbolic of the Christ Child, "Christ the King"), hosted the next week's party. Traditionally, this was a bean for the king and a pea for the queen. Parties centred around king cakes are no longer common and king cake today is usually brought to the workplace or served at parties, the recipient of the plastic baby being obligated to bring the next king cake to the next function. In some countries, Twelfth Night and Epiphany mark the start of the Carnival season, which lasts through Mardi Gras Day.

In Spain, Twelfth Night is called víspera de Reyes ("Kings' Eve"), and historically the "kings" would go through towns and hand out sweets.

In France, La Galette des Rois ("Kings' Cake") is eaten all month long. The cakes vary depending on the region; in northern France, it is called a galette and is filled with frangipane, fruit, or chocolate. In the south, it is more of a brioche with candied fruit.

=== Suppression ===
Twelfth Night in the Netherlands became so secularised, rowdy, and boisterous that public celebrations were banned by the Church.

=== Old Twelfth Night ===
In some places, particularly in the West Country, Old Twelfth Night (or "Old Twelvey") is still celebrated on 17 January. This continues the custom of the Apple Wassail on the date that corresponded to 6 January on the Julian calendar at the time of the change in calendars enacted by the Calendar Act 1750.

== In literature ==
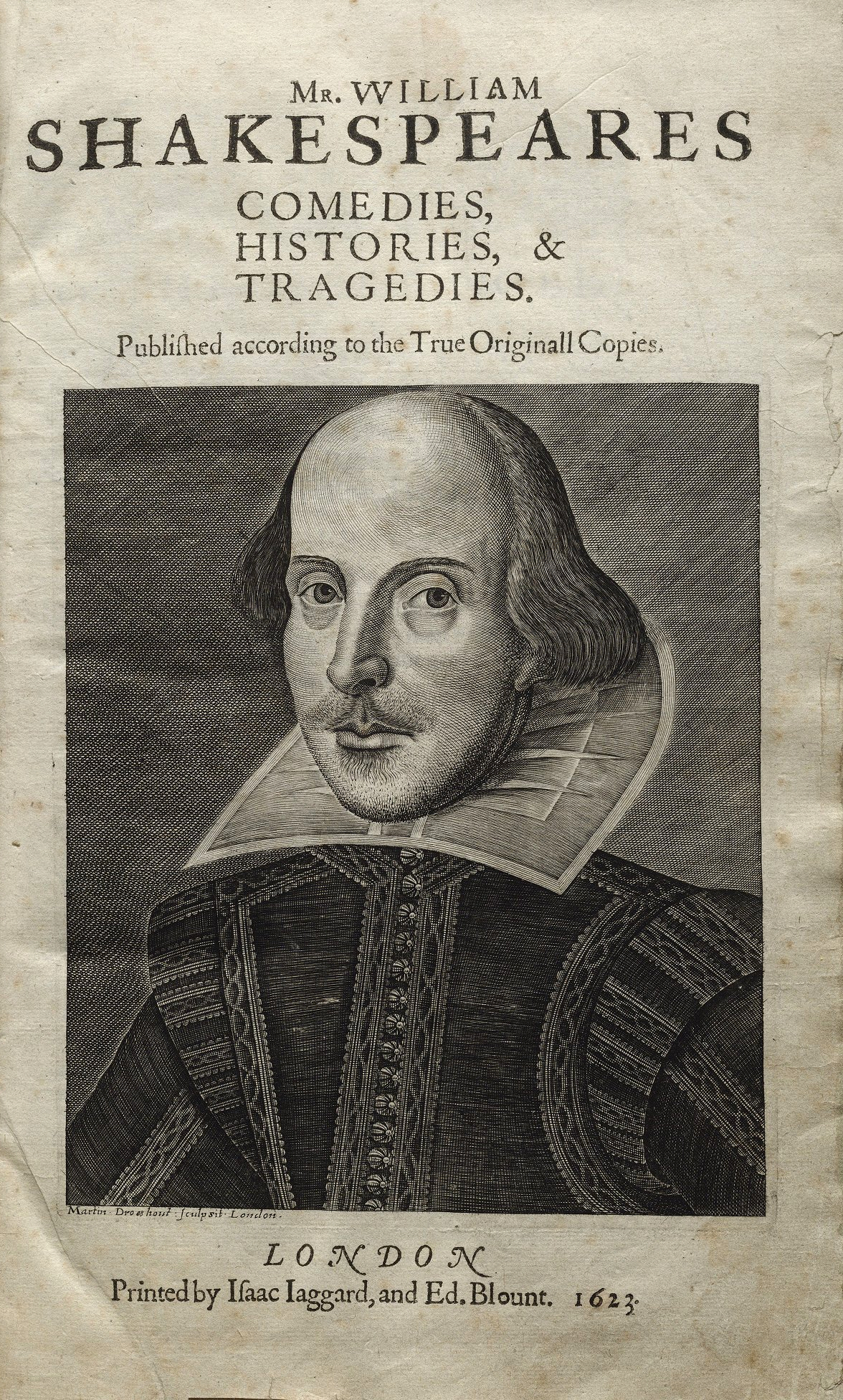
William Shakespeare wrote the play Twelfth Night, circa 1601.

It is unknown whether Shakespeare's play Twelfth Night, or What You Will was written to be performed as a Twelfth Night entertainment, since there is no record of the circumstances of its composition. The earliest known performance took place at Middle Temple Hall, one of the Inns of Court, on Candlemas night, 2 February 1602. The play has many elements that are reversed, in the tradition of Twelfth Night, such as a woman Viola dressing as a man, and a servant Malvolio imagining that he can become a nobleman.

Ben Jonson's The Masque of Blackness was performed on 6 January 1605 at the Banqueting House in Whitehall. It was originally entitled The Twelfth Nights Revells. The accompanying Masque, The Masque of Beauty was performed in the same court the Sunday night after the Twelfth Night in 1608.

Robert Herrick's poem Twelfth-Night, or King and Queene, published in 1648, describes the election of king and queen by bean and pea in a plum cake, and the homage done to them by the draining of wassail bowls of "lamb's-wool", a drink of sugar, nutmeg, ginger, and ale.

Charles Dickens' 1843 A Christmas Carol briefly mentions Scrooge and the Ghost of Christmas Present visiting a children's Twelfth Night party.

In chapter 6 of Harrison Ainsworth's 1858 novel Mervyn Clitheroe, the eponymous hero is elected King of festivities at the Twelfth Night celebrations held in Tom Shakeshaft's barn by receiving the slice of plum cake containing the bean; his companion Cissy obtains the pea and becomes queen, and they are seated together in a high corner to view the proceedings. The distribution has been rigged to prevent another person from gaining the role. The festivities include country dances, the introduction of a "Fool Plough", a plough decked with ribands brought into the barn by a dozen mummers together with a grotesque "Old Bessie" (played by a man), and a Fool dressed in animal skins with a fool's hat. The mummers carry wooden swords and perform revelries. The scene in the novel is illustrated by Hablot Knight Browne ("Phiz"). In the course of the evening, the fool's antics cause a fight to break out, but Mervyn restores order. Three bowls of gin punch are disposed of. At eleven o'clock, the young men make the necessary arrangements to see the young ladies safely home across the fields.

"The Dead" – the final, novella-length story in James Joyce's 1914 collection Dubliners – opens on Twelfth Night, or Epiphany Eve, and extends into the early morning hours of Epiphany itself. Critics and writers consider the story "just about the finest short story in the English language" and "one of the greatest short stories ever written". Its adaptations include a play, a Broadway musical, and two films. The story begins at the bustling and sumptuous annual dance hosted by Kate Morkan and Julia Morkan, aunts to Gabriel Conroy, the main character. Throughout the festivities, a series of minor obligations and awkward encounters leaves Gabriel with a sense of unease, inducing self-doubt, or at least doubt in the person he presents himself as. This unease sharpens during a dinner speech in which Gabriel grandiosely ponders whether because "...we are living in a skeptical and, if I may use the phrase, a thought-tormented age", the generation currently coming of age in Ireland will begin to "lack those qualities of humanity, of hospitality, of kindly humor which belonged to an older day." High spirits and singing soon resume. Gabriel and his wife Gretta depart for their hotel in the early morning hours. This destination for Gabriel kindles both erotic possibility and deep love. However, at the hotel, Gretta, moved by a song they had just heard sung at the party, offers a tearful, long-withheld revelation that momentarily shatters Gabriel's feelings of warmth, leaving him shaken and bewildered. After Gretta drifts off to sleep, Gabriel, still rapt in the emotional wake of her revelation, gazes out the window at the falling snow and experiences a profound and unifying epiphany, one that reconciles the fears, doubts, and façades that had haunted him throughout the evening and, he seems to recognise, throughout his life to that point.

== See also ==
- Christmas Eve
- List of Christmas carols
- Pantomime
- Theophany
