= Armistice (disambiguation) =

An armistice is an agreement between warring factions to stop fighting.

Armistice may also refer to:

- Armistice (album), a 2009 album by Mutemath
- Armistice (band), a Canadian indie pop band
- Armistice (film), a 2013 film by Luke Massey starring Joseph Morgan
- "Armistice", a song by Phoenix from the 2009 album Wolfgang Amadeus Phoenix
- "Armistice", a song by Pure Reason Revolution from the 2010 album Hammer and Anvil
- "Armistice", a 2005 episode of the TV series The Colbert Report

== See also ==
- Armistice of 11 November 1918, a famous example
- Armistice Army, a military of Vichy France
- Armistice Day
