= Bach: The Great Passion =

British radio programme

Bach: The Great Passion is a 2017 biographical radio play by the English writer James Runcie, dealing with the inception and premiere of the St Matthew Passion. It premiered on BBC Radio 4 on 15 April 2017, with Simon Russell Beale in the title role, directed by Eoin O'Callaghan and produced by Marilyn Imrie.

== Premiere cast ==
- Johann Sebastian Bach - Simon Russell Beale
- Anna Magdalena Bach - Melody Grove
- Christian Henrici - Al Weaver
- Stefan Meissner - Adam Greaves Neal
- Paul Christian Stolle, one of Bach's pupils - Stephen Boxer
- Salomon Deyling - David Horovitch
- Johann Gottlieb Gorner - Tom Goodman-Hill
- Herman - Ewan Rutherford
- Bach's Child - Damon Denton-Snape
