= The Twelfth Night Feast =

Painting by the Dutch painter Jan Steen

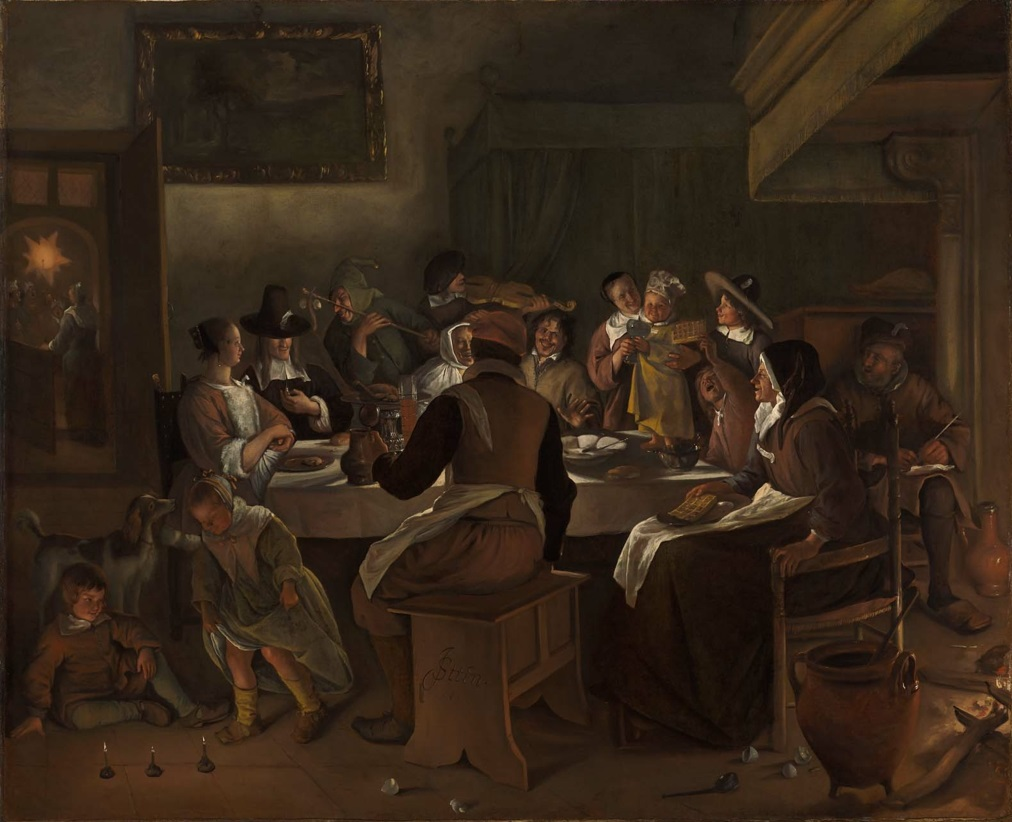
- Artist: Jan Steen
- Year: 1662
- Medium: Oil on canvas
- Dimensions: 131.1 cm × 164.5 cm (51.6 in × 64.8 in)
- Location: Museum of Fine Arts, Boston, Boston, Massachusetts

The Twelfth Night Feast is a relatively large 1662 oil painting by Jan Steen, now in the Museum of Fine Arts, Boston, which bought it in 1945.

The picture depicts the Twelfth Night celebrations marking the end of the Christmas festivities and the beginning of Epiphany. It is the date when the Three Kings arrived at the stable in Bethlehem to pay homage to the newborn Jesus.

Here Steen depicts in his typical style the indoor celebrations in a well-to-do Dutch household. Children are playing on the floor with three candles symbolic of the three kings, whilst at the table, between the carousing adults, another boy offers a youngster dressed as a king a bite of his festival waffle.
