= Twelve Days of Christmas =

Period between 26 December and 6 January

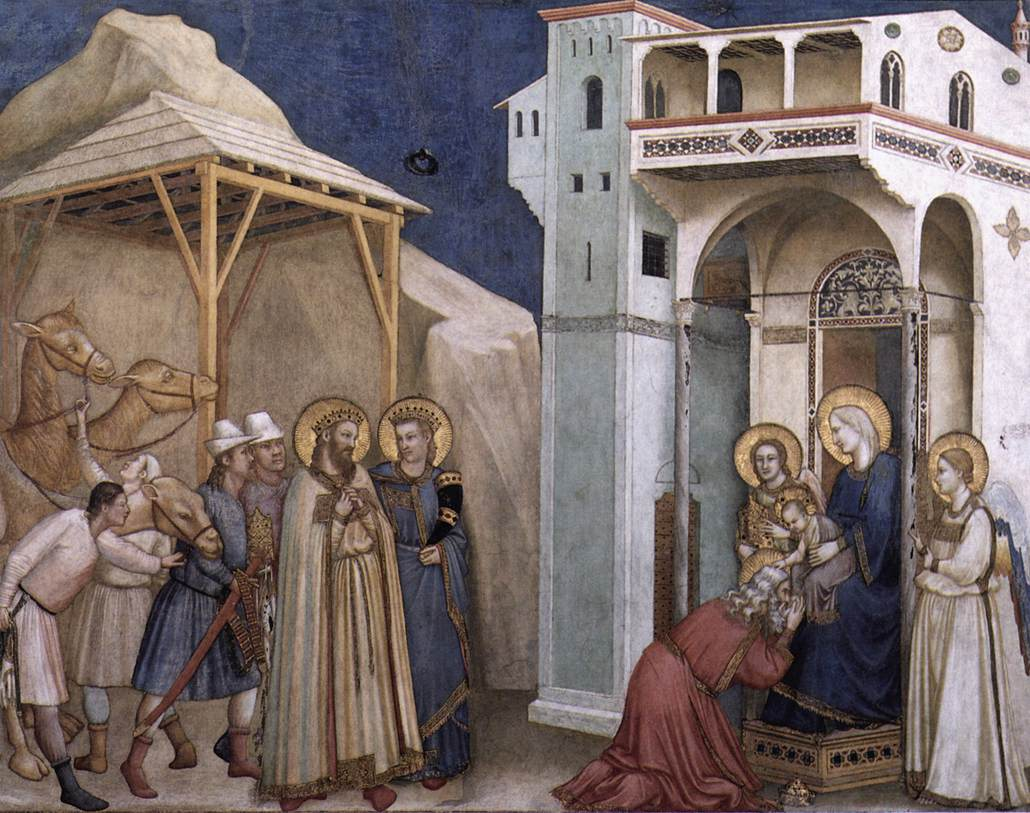
- The Adoration of the Magi, Fresco at the Lower Church of the Basilica of San Francesco d'Assisi in Assisi, Italy
- Observed by: Christians
- Type: Christian
- Observances: Varies by denomination, culture, and nation
- Date: 25 December – 5 January inclusive
- Frequency: annual
- Related to: Christmas Day, Christmastide, Twelfth Night, Epiphany, and Epiphanytide

The Twelve Days of Christmas, or Twelve Days of Christmastide, is the festive Christian season celebrating the Nativity of Jesus. In Western Christianity it begins with Christmas Day (25 December) and includes Saint Stephen's Day (26 December), the Feast of Saint John the Apostle (27 December), Childermas (28 December), New Year's Eve or Saint Sylvester's Day (31 December), New Year's Day or the Feast of the Circumcision of Christ (1 January), and the Feast of the Holy Family (date varies). It ends with Twelfth Night or Epiphany Eve (the evening of 5 January).

For Christian denominations such as the Evangelical-Lutheran Churches and Anglican Communion, the Twelve Days are identical to Christmastide (25 December through to 5 January), and this is followed by the season of Epiphanytide, which begins on 6 January. For the Catholic Church, however, Christmastide lasts longer, until the Feast of the Baptism of the Lord. For some, the Twelve Days are considered 26 December to 6 January, thus including Epiphany.

== History ==
In 567, the Council of Tours "proclaimed the twelve days from Christmas to Epiphany (that is, through to the end of 5 January, as Epiphany begins the following day) as a sacred and festive season, and established the duty of Advent fasting in preparation for the feast." Christopher Hill, as well as William J. Federer, states that this was done in order to solve the "administrative problem for the Roman Empire as it tried to coordinate the solar Julian calendar with the lunar calendars of its provinces in the east."

== Eastern Christianity ==
The Armenian Apostolic Church and Armenian Catholic Church celebrate the Birth and Baptism of Christ on the same day, so that there is no distinction between a feast of Christmas and a feast of Epiphany.

The Oriental Orthodox (other than the Armenians), the Eastern Orthodox, and the Eastern Lutherans and Eastern Catholics both of whom follow the same traditions have a twelve-day interval between the two feasts. Christmas and Epiphany are celebrated by these churches on 25 December and 6 January on both the Gregorian calendar and Julian calendar (these days on the Julian calendar correspond to 7 and 19 January on the Gregorian calendar).

=== Eastern Orthodoxy ===
For the Eastern Orthodox, both Christmas and Epiphany are among the Twelve Great Feasts that are only second to Easter in importance.

The period between Christmas and Epiphany is fast-free. During this period one celebration leads into another. The Nativity of Christ is a three-day celebration: the formal title of the first day (i.e. Christmas Eve) is "The Nativity According to the Flesh of our Lord, God and Saviour Jesus Christ", and celebrates not only the Nativity of Jesus, but also the Adoration of the Shepherds of Bethlehem and the arrival of the Magi; the second day is referred to as the "Synaxis of the Theotokos", and commemorates the role of the Virgin Mary in the Incarnation; the third day is known as the "Third Day of the Nativity", and is also the feast day of the Protodeacon and Protomartyr Saint Stephen. 29 December is the Orthodox Feast of the Holy Innocents. The Afterfeast of the Nativity (similar to the Western octave) continues until 31 December (that day is known as the Apodosis or "leave-taking" of the Nativity).

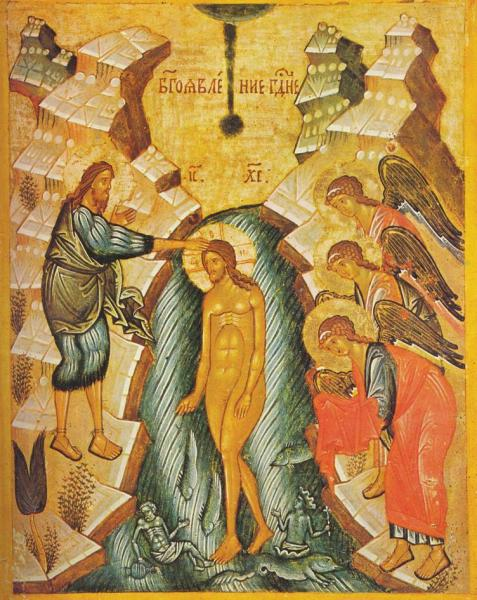
Russian icon of the Theophany

The Saturday following the Nativity is commemorated by special readings from the Epistle (1 Tim 6:11–16) and Gospel (Matt 12:15–21) during the Divine Liturgy. The Sunday after the Nativity has its own liturgical commemoration in honour of "The Righteous Ones: Joseph the Betrothed, David the King and James the Brother of the Lord".

Another of the more prominent festivals that are included among the Twelve Great Feasts is that of the Circumcision of Christ on 1 January. On this same day is the feast day of Saint Basil the Great, and so the service celebrated on that day is the Divine Liturgy of Saint Basil.

On 2 January begins the Forefeast of the Theophany. The Eve of the Theophany on 5 January is a day of strict fasting, on which the devout will not eat anything until the first star is seen at night. This day is known as Paramony (Greek Παραμονή "Eve"), and follows the same general outline as Christmas Eve. That morning is the celebration of the Royal Hours and then the Divine Liturgy of Saint Basil combined with Vespers, at the conclusion of which is celebrated the Great Blessing of Waters, in commemoration of the Baptism of Jesus in the Jordan River. There are certain parallels between the hymns chanted on Paramony and those of Good Friday, to show that, according to Orthodox theology, the steps that Jesus took into the Jordan River were the first steps on the way to the Cross. That night the All-Night Vigil is served for the Feast of the Theophany.

== Western Christianity ==
Within the Twelve Days of Christmas, there are celebrations both secular and religious.

Christmas Day, counted as the first day of Christmastide in Catholicism, Lutheranism and Anglicanism, is celebrated by Christians as the liturgical feast of the Nativity of the Lord. It is a public holiday in many nations, including some such as India where the majority of the population is not Christian. On this see the articles on Christmas and Christmas traditions.

26 December is "Saint Stephen's Day", a feast day in the Western Church. In the United Kingdom and its former colonies, it is also the secular holiday of Boxing Day. In some parts of Ireland it is denominated "Wren Day".

27 December is the Feast of Saint John the Evangelist, while 28 December is Childermass or the Feast of the Holy Innocents, in observance of the Massacre of the Innocents of the Nativity narrative, in which Herod the Great, king of Judea, orders the execution of all male children who are two years old and under in the vicinity of Bethlehem.

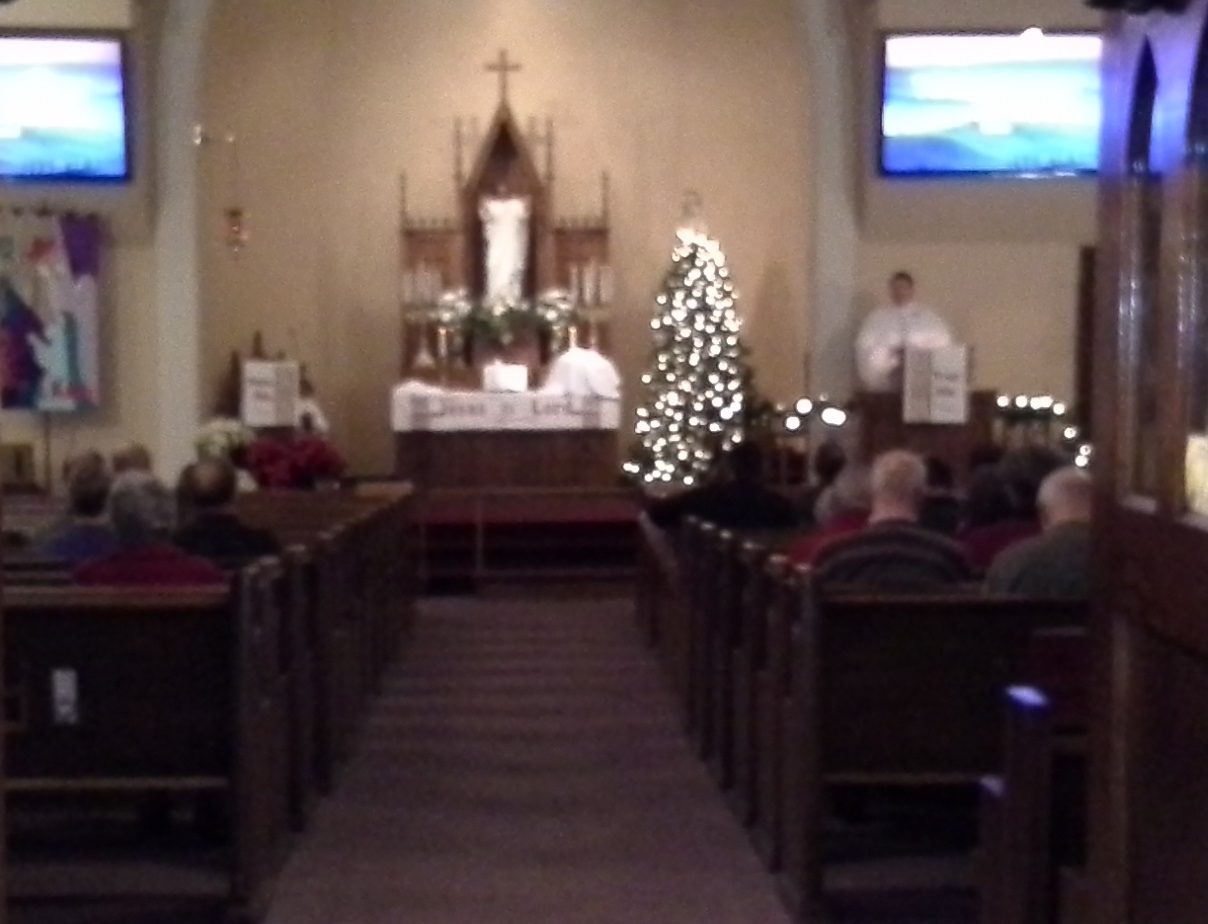
A Watchnight Mass at a Lutheran Christian church on New Year's Eve (2014)

New Year's Eve (31 December) is the feast of Pope St. Sylvester I and is known also as "Silvester". The transition that evening to the new year is an occasion for secular festivities in many nations, and in several languages is known as "St. Sylvester Night" ("Notte di San Silvestro" in Italian, "Silvesternacht" in German, "Réveillon de la Saint-Sylvestre" in French, and "סילבסטר" in Hebrew). Several Christian traditions, such as Catholic, Lutheran, Anglican, Methodist, and Moravian churches, offer various forms of Watchnight services, where the congregants are encouraged to review the year passed and pray for the year to come, often in connection with the celebration of Mass or the Lord's Supper.

New Year's Day (1 January) is an occasion for further secular festivities or for rest from the celebrations of the night before. In the Roman Rite of the Catholic Church, it is the Solemnity of Mary, Mother of God, liturgically celebrated on the Octave Day of Christmas. It has also been celebrated, and still is in some denominations (such as Lutheranism and Anglicanism), as the Feast of the Circumcision of Christ, because according to Jewish tradition He would have been circumcised on the eighth day after His Birth, inclusively counting the first day and last day. This day, or someday proximate to it, is also celebrated by the Catholics as World Day of Peace.

In many nations, e. g., the United States, the Solemnity of Epiphany is transferred to the first Sunday after 1 January, which can occur as early as 2 January. That solemnity, then, together with customary observances associated with it, usually occur within the Twelve Days of Christmas, even if these are considered to end on 5 January rather than 6 January.

Other Catholic liturgical feasts on the General Roman Calendar that occur within the Octave of Christmas and therefore also within the Twelve Days of Christmas are the Feast of St. Stephen on 26 December the Feast of St. John, Apostle and Evangelist on 27 December; the Feast of the Holy Innocents on 28 December; Memorial of St. Thomas Becket, Bishop and Martyr on 29 December; and the Feast of the Holy Family of Jesus, Mary, and Joseph on the Sunday within the Octave of Christmas or, if there is no such Sunday, on 30 December. Outside the Octave, but within the Twelve Days of Christmas, there are the feasts of Sts. Basil the Great and Gregory of Nazianzus on 2 January and the Memorial of the Holy Name of Jesus on 3 January.

Other saints are celebrated at a local level.

=== Late Antiquity and the Middle Ages ===
The Second Council of Tours of 567 noted that, in the area for which its bishops were responsible, the days between Christmas and Epiphany were, like the month of August, taken up entirely with saints' days. Monks were therefore in principle not bound to fast on those days. However, the first three days of the year were to be days of prayer and penance so that faithful Christians would refrain from participating in the idolatrous practices and debauchery associated with the new year celebrations. The Fourth Council of Toledo (633) ordered a strict fast on those days, on the model of the Lenten fast.

=== England in the Middle Ages ===
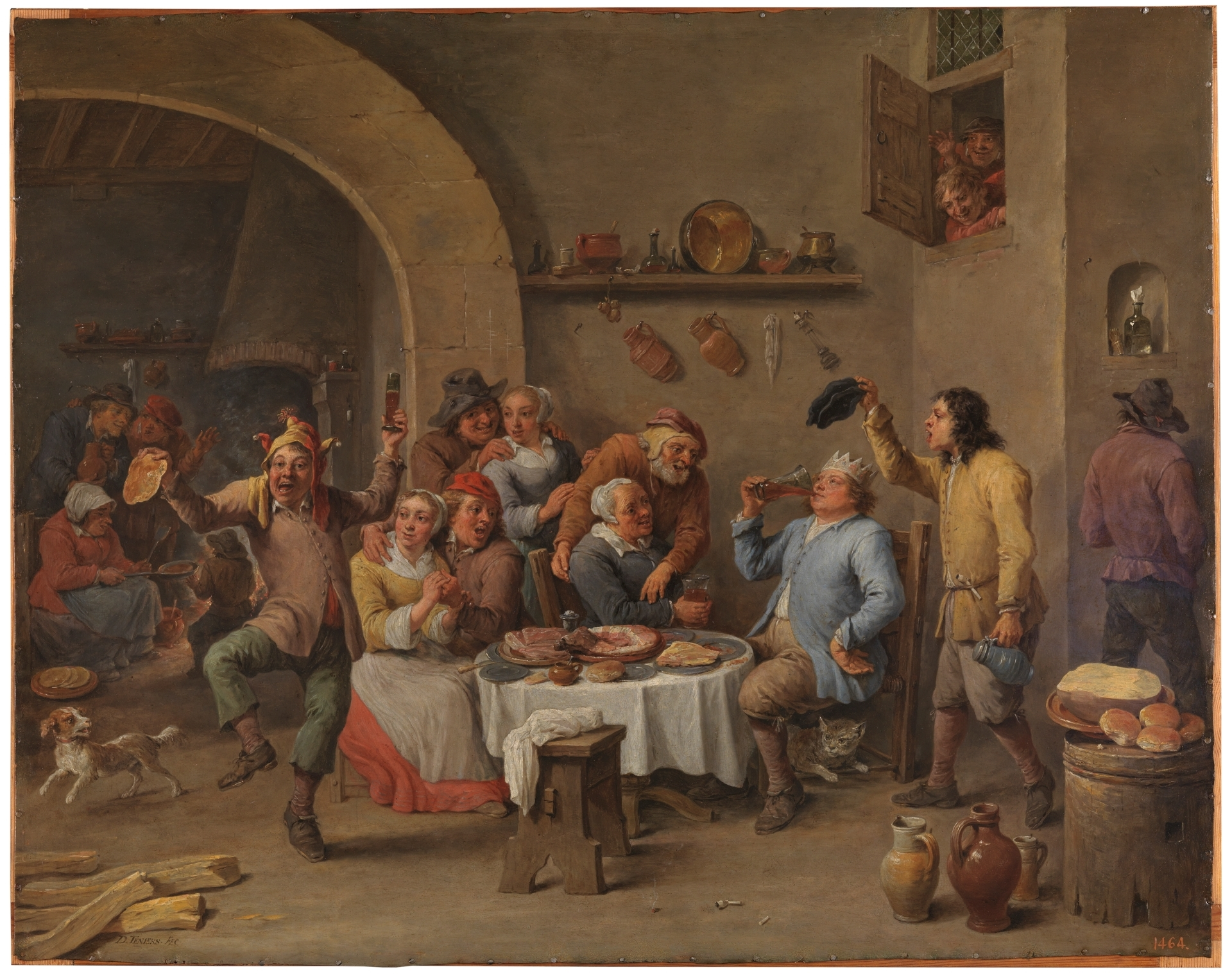
Twelfth Night (The King Drinks) by David Teniers c. 1634–1640

In England in the Middle Ages, this period was one of continuous feasting and merrymaking, which climaxed on Twelfth Night, the traditional end of the Christmas season on 5 January (the last night before Epiphany which started 6 January). William Shakespeare used it as the setting for one of his most famous stage plays, Twelfth Night. Often a Lord of Misrule was chosen to lead the Christmas revels.

Some of these traditions were adapted from the older pagan customs, including the Roman Saturnalia and the Germanic Yuletide. Some also have an echo in modern-day pantomime where traditionally authority is mocked and the principal male lead is played by a woman, while the leading older female character, or 'Dame', is played by a man.

=== Colonial North America ===
Some early English colonists brought their version of the Twelve Days with them to North America, and adapted them to their new country, adding their own variations over the years. In New England, however, both the Pilgrims in Plymouth Colony and the Puritans in Massachusetts Bay frowned upon the observance of Christmas. As early as Christmas Day in 1621, Governor William Bradford "encounterd a group of people who were taking the day off from work, and he promptly sent them back to work." Nissenbaum further notes that "[what] bothered the governor was that these Christmas-keepers were, in his own words, out 'gaming [and] reveling in the streets."

One tradition, the modern-day Christmas wreath, may have originated with these colonials. A homemade wreath would be fashioned from local greenery, and fruits, if available, were added. Making the wreaths was one of the traditions of Christmas Eve; they would remain hung on each home's front door beginning on Christmas Night (first night of Christmas) through Twelfth Night or Epiphany morning. As was already the tradition in their native England, all decorations would be taken down by Epiphany morning and the remainder of the edibles would be consumed. A special cake, the king cake, was also baked then for Epiphany.

== Modern Western customs ==
=== United Kingdom and Commonwealth ===
Many in the UK and other Commonwealth nations still celebrate some aspects of the Twelve Days of Christmas. Boxing Day, 26 December, is a national holiday in many Commonwealth nations. Victorian era stories by Charles Dickens, and others, particularly A Christmas Carol, hold key elements of the celebrations such as the consumption of plum pudding, roasted goose and wassail. These foods are consumed more at the beginning of the Twelve Days in the UK.

In the Western Christian world, the two traditional days when Christmas decorations are removed are Twelfth Night and if they are not taken down on that day, Candlemas, the latter of which ends the Christmas-Epiphany season in some denominations. Taking down Christmas decorations before Twelfth Night, as well as leaving the decorations up beyond Candlemas, is historically considered to be inauspicious. In Germany, Christmas decorations are traditionally removed on Candlemas Day.

=== United States ===
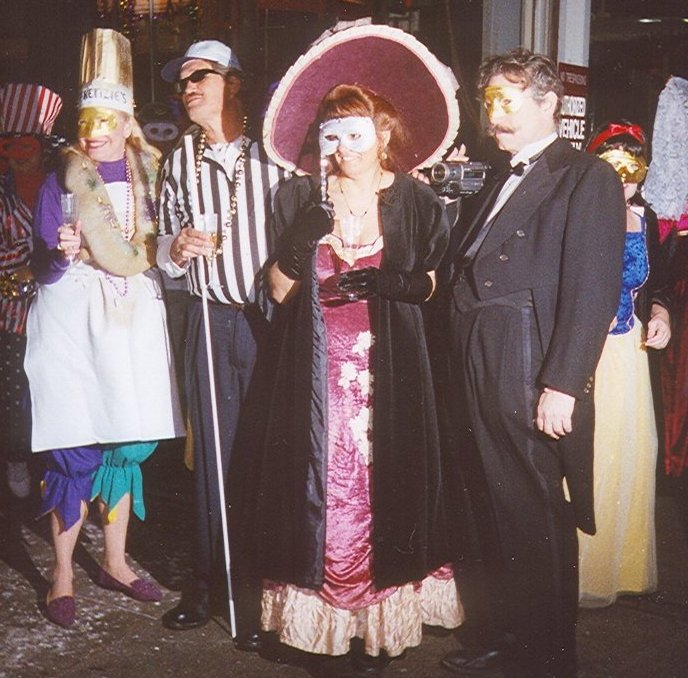
Twelfth Night costumers in New Orleans

In the United States, Christmas Day is a federal holiday which holds additional religious significance for Christians.

The traditions of the Twelve Days of Christmas have been nearly forgotten in the United States. Contributing factors include the popularity of the stories of Charles Dickens in nineteenth-century America, with their emphasis on generous giving; introduction of secular traditions in the 19th and 20th centuries, e.g. the American Santa Claus; and increase in the popularity of secular New Year's Eve parties. Presently, the commercial practice treats the Solemnity of Christmas, 25 December, the first day of Christmas, as the last day of the "Christmas" marketing season, as the numerous "after-Christmas sales" that commence on 26 December demonstrate. The commercial calendar has encouraged an erroneous assumption that the Twelve Days end on Christmas Day and must therefore begin on 14 December.

Many American Christians still celebrate the traditional liturgical seasons of Advent and Christmas, especially Catholics, Amish, Anglo-Catholics, Episcopalians, Lutherans, Mennonites, Methodists, Moravians, Nazarenes, Orthodox Christians, and Presbyterians. In Anglicanism, the designation of the "Twelve Days of Christmas" is used liturgically in the Episcopal Church in the US, having its own invitatory antiphon in the Book of Common Prayer for Matins.

Christians who celebrate the Twelve Days may give gifts on each of them, with each of the Twelve Days representing a wish for a corresponding month of the new year. They may feast on traditional foods and otherwise celebrate the entire time through the morning of the Solemnity of Epiphany. Contemporary traditions include lighting a candle for each day, singing the verse of the corresponding day from the famous The Twelve Days of Christmas, and lighting a yule log on Christmas Eve and letting it burn some more on each of the twelve nights. For some, the Twelfth Night remains the night of the most festive parties and exchanges of gifts. Some households exchange gifts on the first (25 December) and last (5 January) days of the Twelve Days.
