= Salomon Deyling =

German Lutheran theologian (1677–1755)

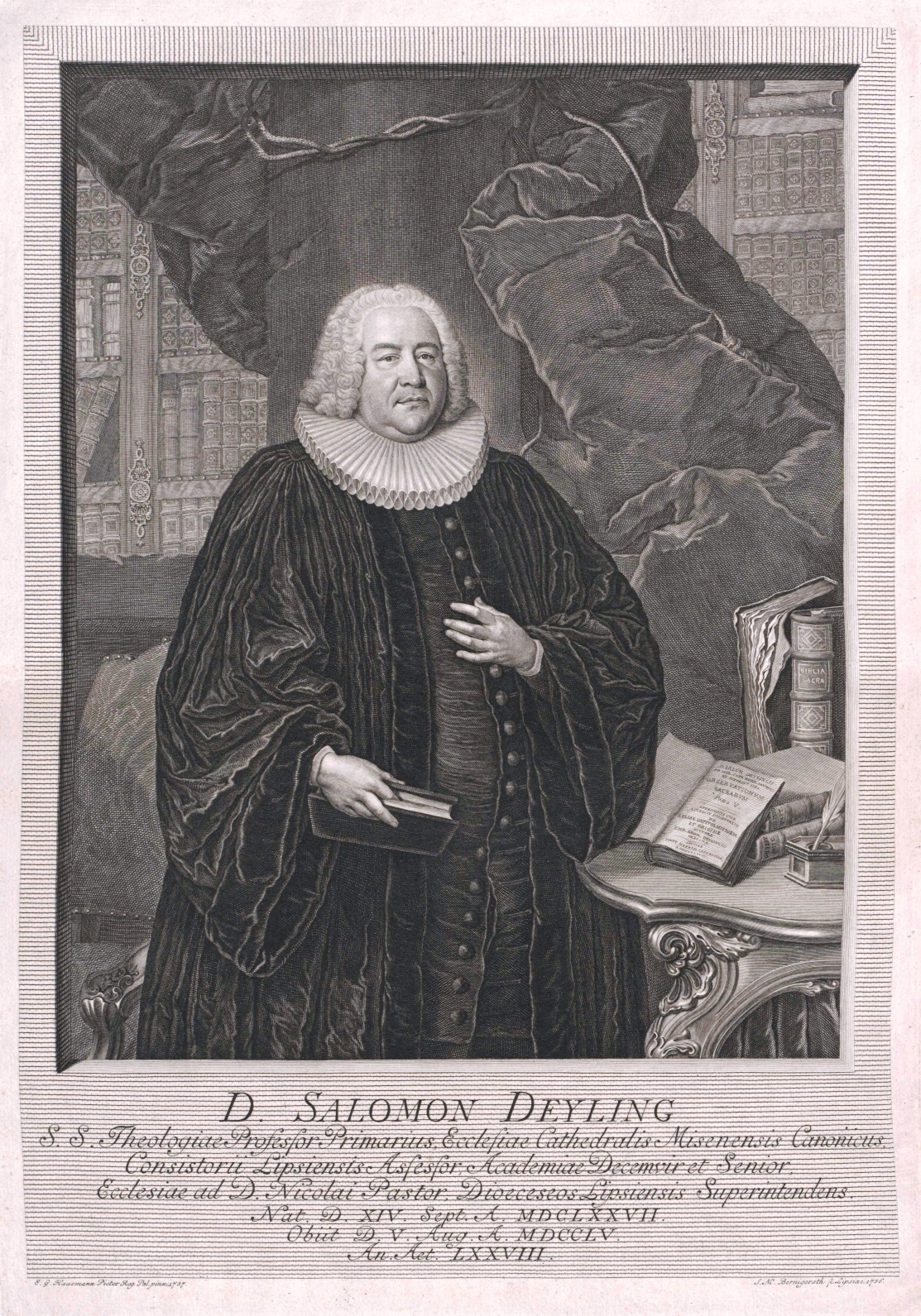
Salomon Deyling

Salomon Deyling was a Lutheran theologian, born on 14 September 1677, at Weida, in Thuringia.

He studied at the University of Wittenberg, where he received his magister degree in 1699. In 1703 he became adjunct in the faculty of philosophy, and in 1710 a doctor of theology. In 1716 he was made general superintendent at Eisleben, and moved to take up the pastorate of the Nicolaikirche at Leipzig in 1720. He served as a full professor of theology at the University of Leipzig from 1722 up until his death. He died on 5 August 1755.

Johann Sebastian Bach is believed to have composed his Epiphany Cantata, Alles nur nach Gottes Willen after listening to a sermon by Salomon.

== Writings ==
Salomon's writings include:

- Dissert. de corrupto Ecclesice Romanae statu ante Lutherum, etc. (Wittenberg, 1734, 4to);
- Observationes Sacrae (Leips. 1735–39, 3d edit. 5 vols. 4to), containing illustrations and critical remarks upon difficult parts of Scripture;
- Observationes Miscellanex (Leipzig 1736, 4to), on questions of exegesis and Church history;
- Institutiones Prudentiae Pastoralis;
- Observationum Sacrarum pars v (Leips. 1748, 4to).
