= Chalking the door =

Christian tradition of blessing one's home

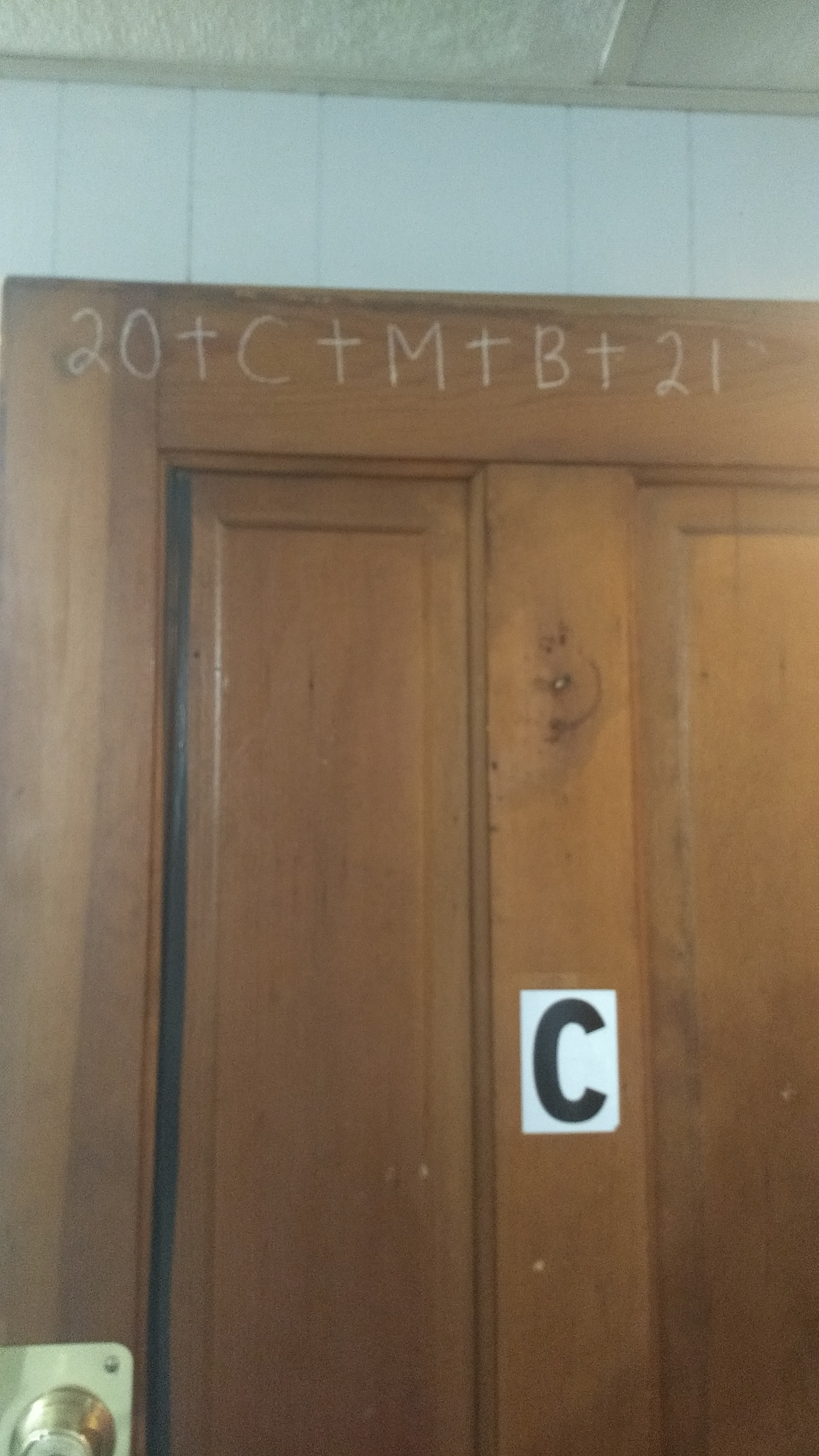
Epiphany season door chalking on an apartment door in the Midwestern US

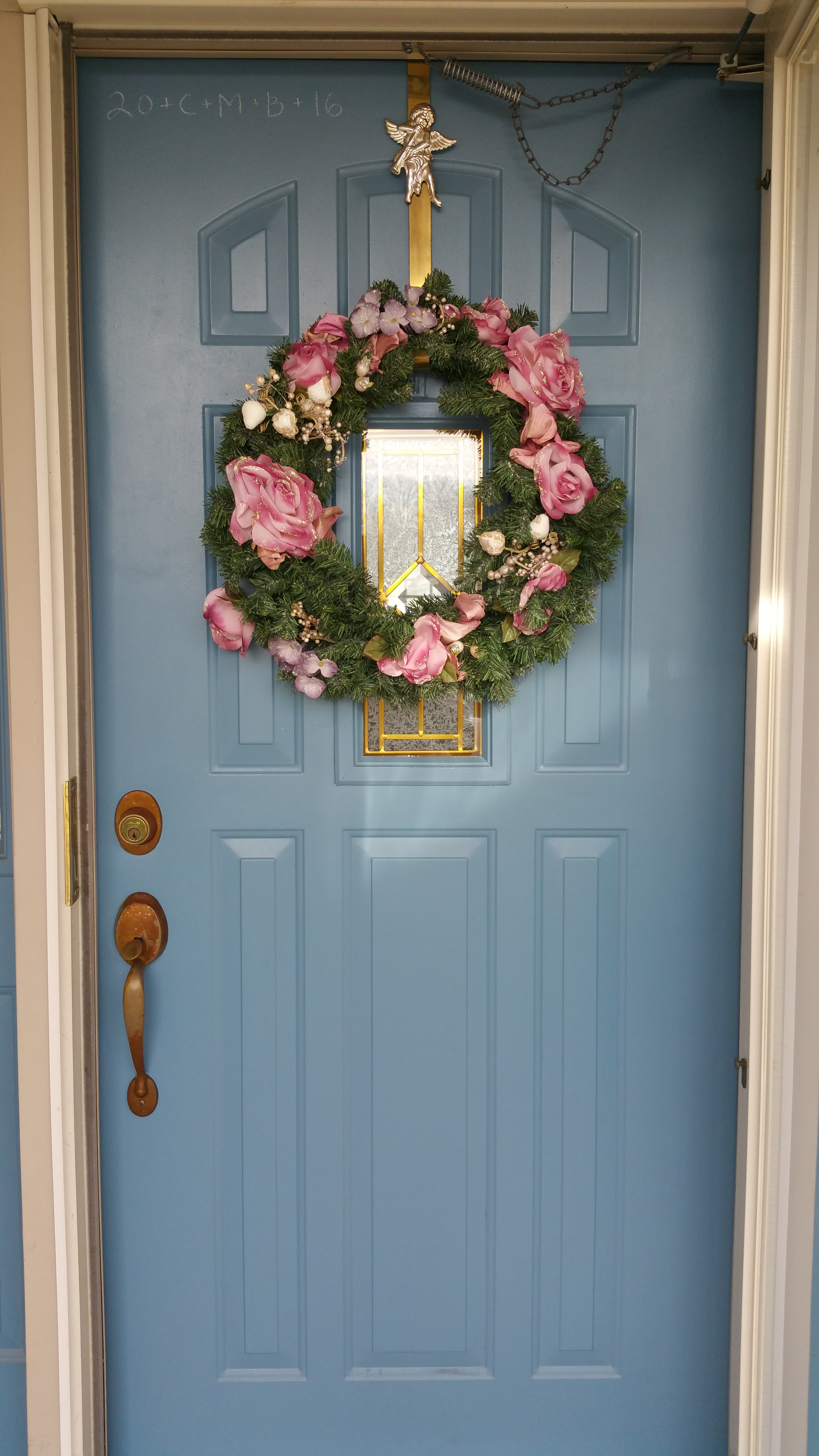
A Christmas wreath adorning a home, with the top left-hand corner of the front door chalked for Epiphany-tide and the wreath hanger bearing a placard of the archangel Gabriel

Chalking the door is a Christian Epiphanytide tradition used to bless one's home. It is normatively in the pattern of four crosses positioned in between the letters C, M and B, often linked to the traditional initials of the three wise men, as well as the Christian prayer "Christus mansionem benedicat" (Latin for "May Christ bless this house") which are surrounded by the first two and last two digits of the current year (e.g. 20 ✝ C ✝ M ✝ B ✝ 26). The practice of chalking the door originated in medieval Europe, though it has spread throughout worldwide Christendom.

== Epiphany ==
Either on Twelfth Night (5 January), the twelfth day of Christmastide and eve of the feast of the Epiphany, or on Epiphany Day (6 January) itself, many Christians (including Catholics, Evangelical-Lutherans, Anglicans/Episcopalians, Methodists, and Presbyterians, among others) write on their doors or lintels with chalk in a pattern such as "20 ✝ C ✝ M ✝ B ✝ 26". The numbers in this example refer to the calendar year 2026 and the crosses to Christ. The letters C, M, and B stand for the traditional names of the biblical Magi (Caspar, Melchior and Balthazar), or alternatively for the Latin blessing Christus mansionem benedicat ('May Christ bless this house').

Chalking the door is done most commonly on Epiphany Day itself. However, it may be done on any day within the Epiphany season. In some localities, the chalk used to write the Epiphanytide pattern is blessed by a Christian priest or minister on Epiphany Day, then taken home to write the pattern.

The Christian custom of chalking the door has a biblical precedent as the Israelites in the Old Testament marked their doors in order to be saved from death; likewise, the Epiphanytide practice serves to protect Christian homes from evil spirits until the next Epiphany Day, at which time the custom is repeated. Families also perform this act to represent the hospitality of the Holy Family to the Magi (and all Gentiles); it thus serves as a house blessing to invite the presence of God in one's home. (Note: The blessing of homes, on whose lintels are inscribed the Cross of salvation, together with the indication of the year and the initials of the three wise men (C+M+B), which can also be interpreted to mean Christus mansionem benedicat, written in blessed chalk. The custom of chalking doors, often accompanied by processions of children accompanied by their parents, expresses the blessing of Christ through the intercession of the three wise men and is an occasion for gathering offerings for charitable and missionary purposes.)

Evangelical-Lutheran cleric Mindy Roll stated that for Christians who chalk their doors, the same serves the purpose of evangelism, with the hope "that each threshold, each conversation, each question might become part of God's radiant epiphany", being the Light of Christ for those who have not encountered Jesus. For Christian homes in neighbourhoods, Roll states that chalk-covered doors proclaim that "Christ is here".

In 20th century Poland, the practice of chalking the door continued among believers as another way of asserting their Christian identity, despite the Eastern Bloc's state atheism and anti-religious campaigns.

== Gallery ==
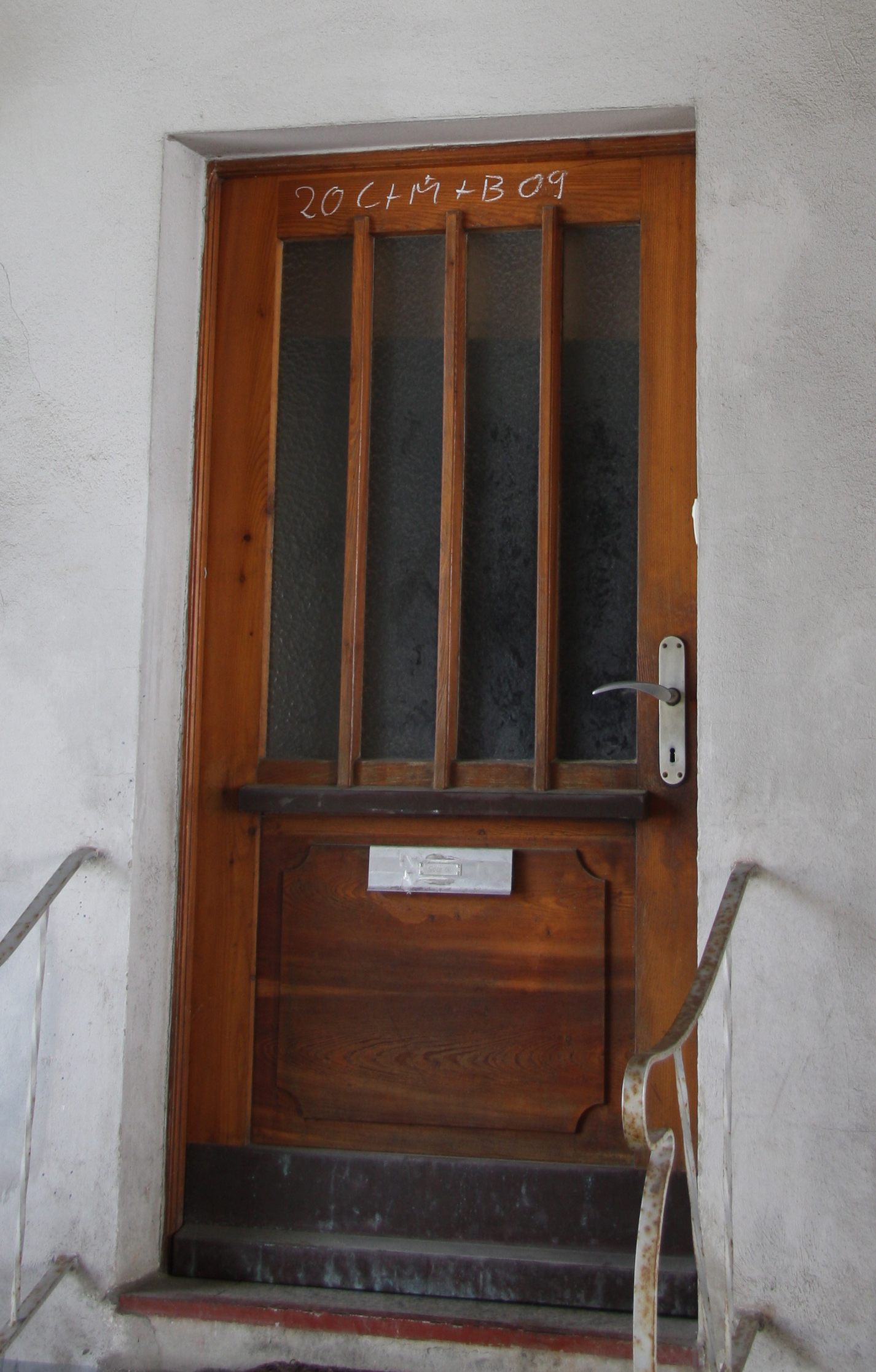
Epiphany season door chalking on an apartment door in Germany

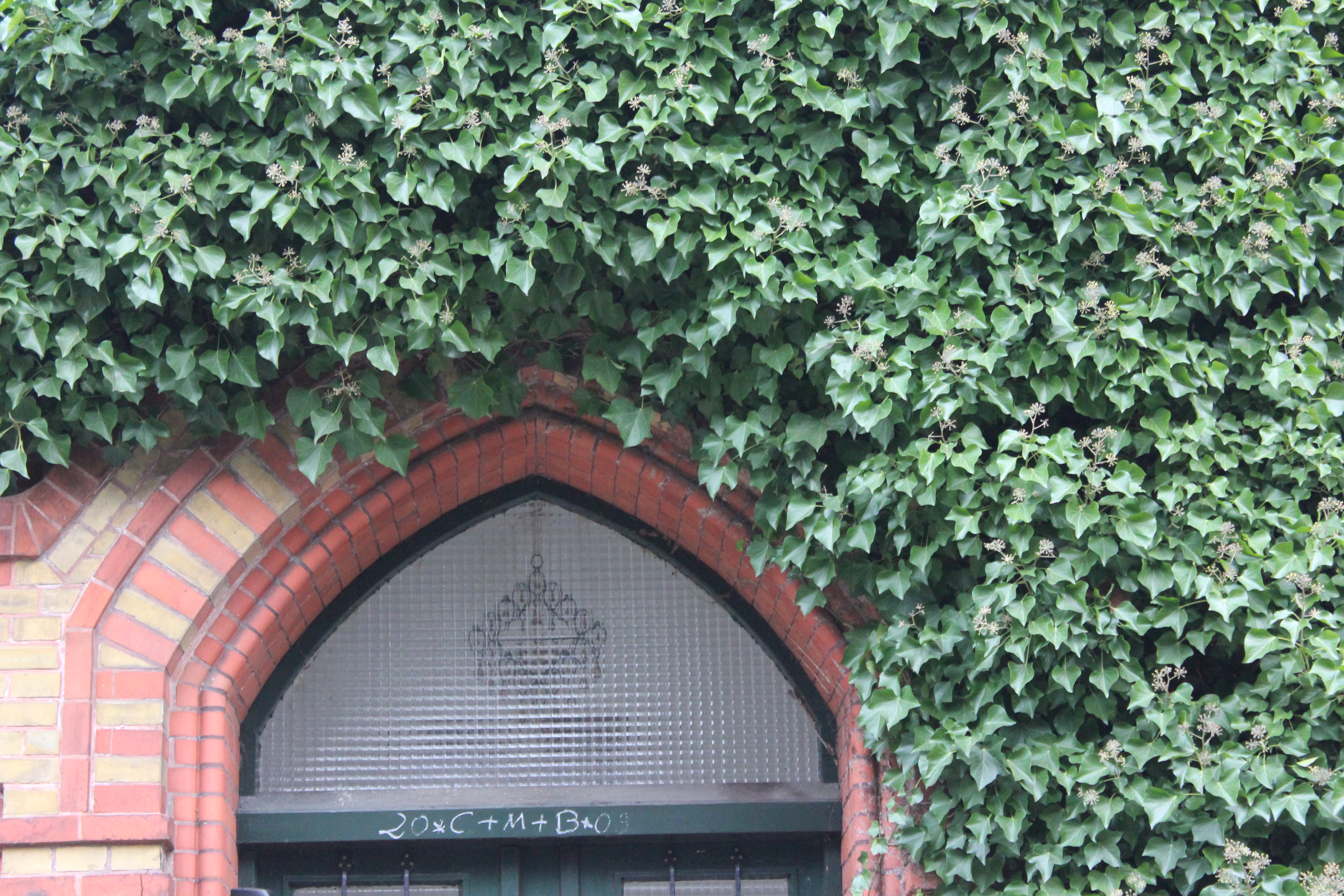
Epiphany season door chalking at the Villa Reepschlägerbahn in Germany

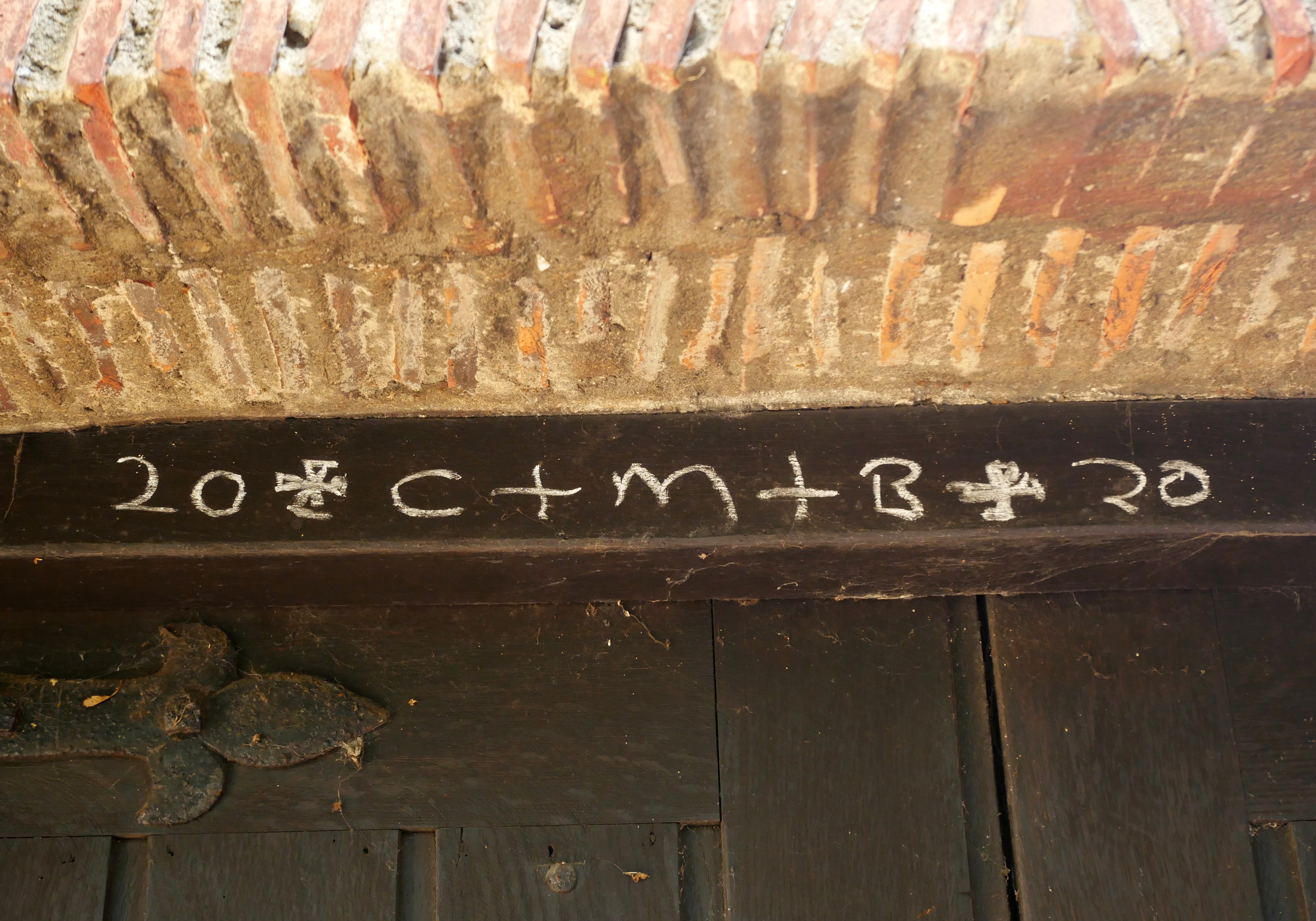
Epiphany door chalking at the Anglican Church of St Michael in Welling, London

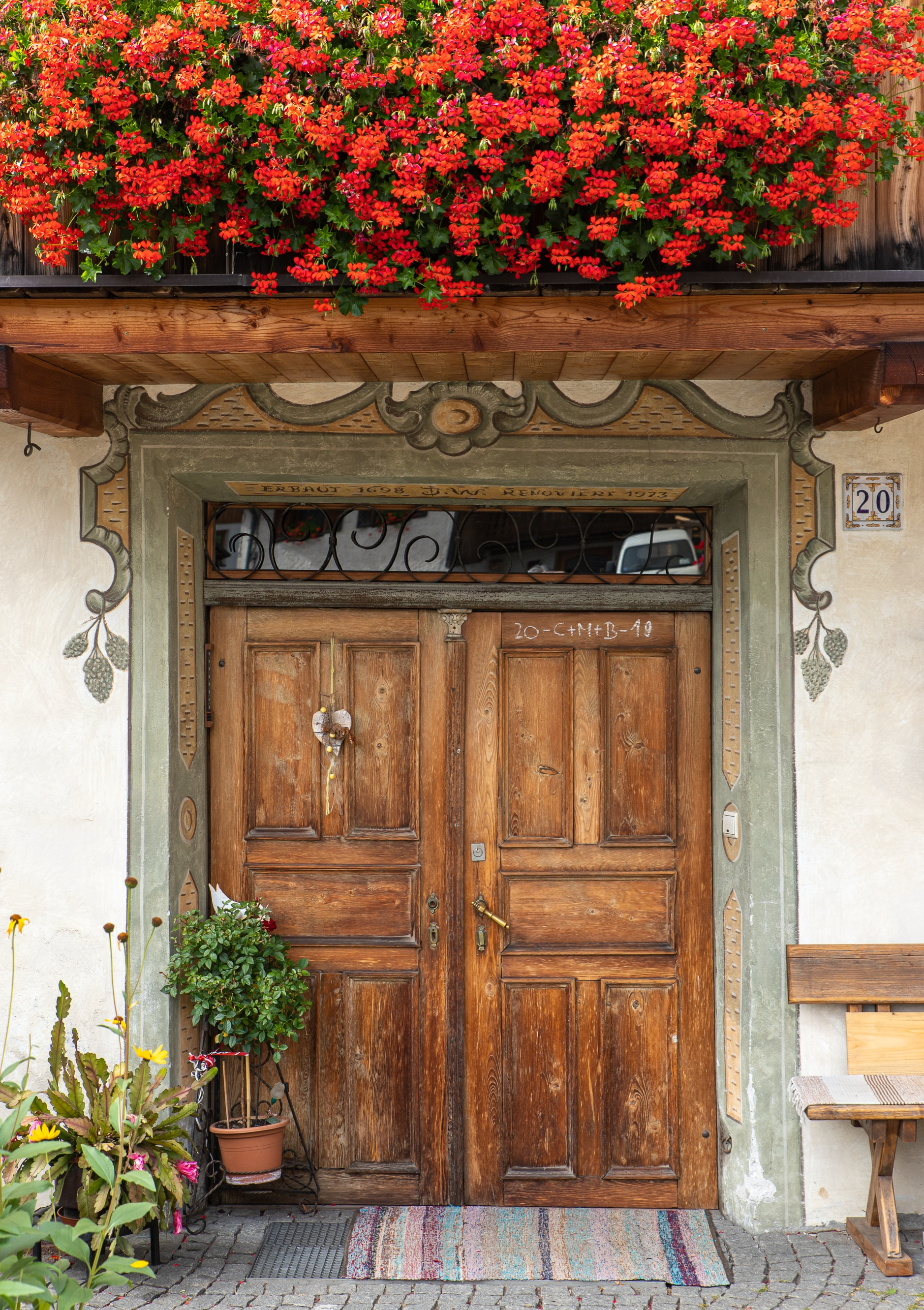
Epiphany door chalking in Sexten, Italy

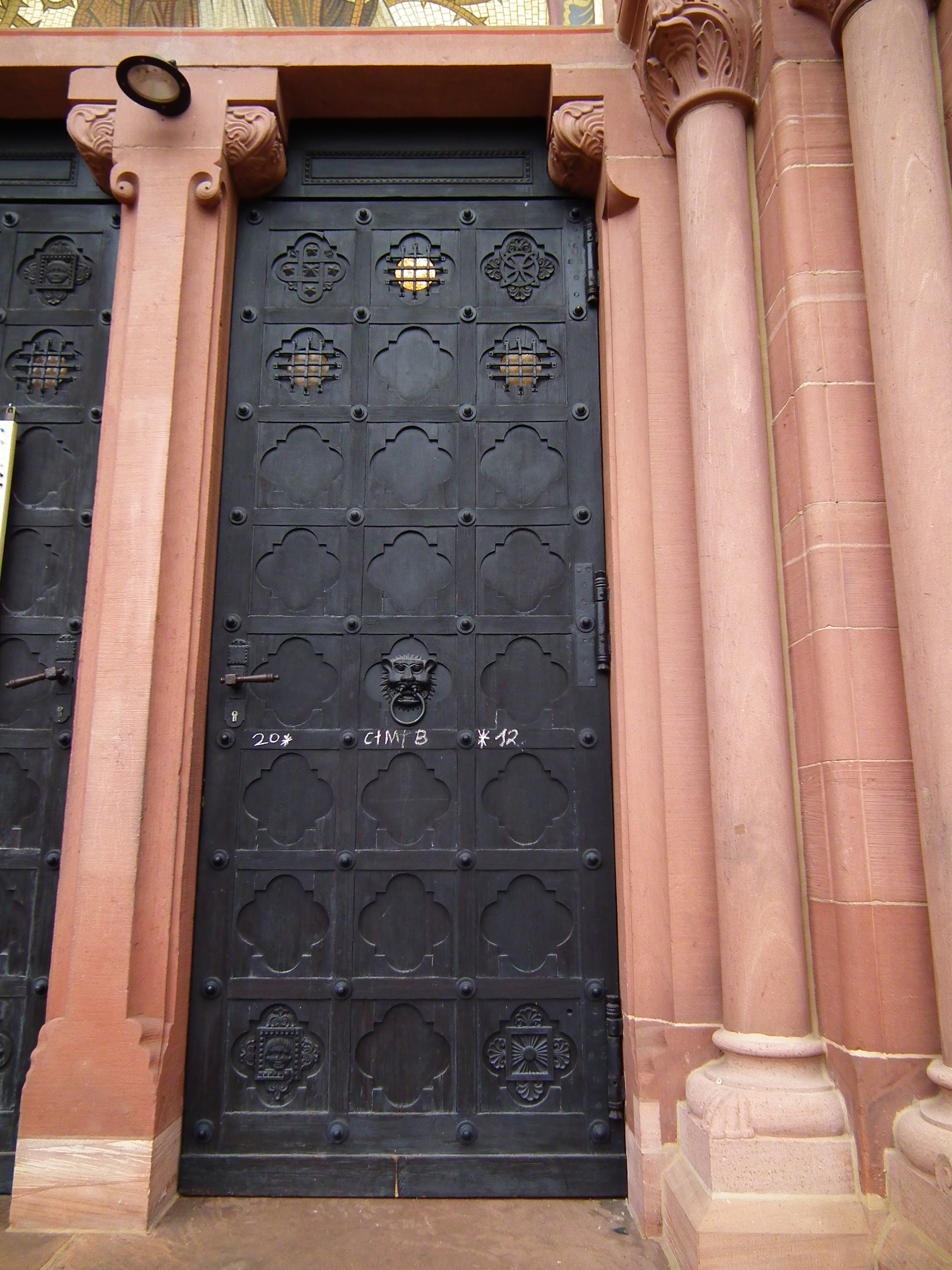
Epiphany door chalking in Heidelberg, Germany

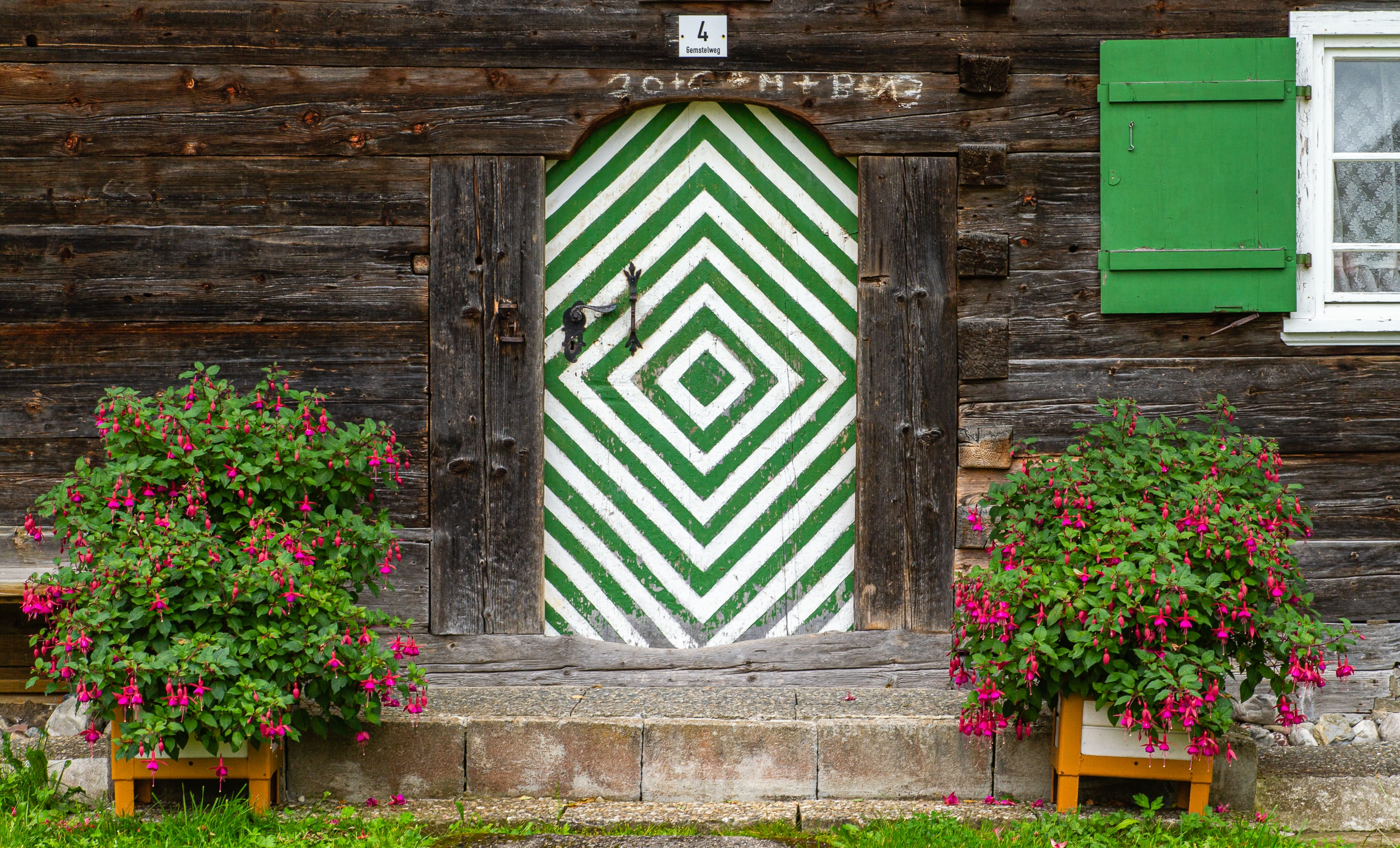
Epiphany door chalking in Mittelberg, Austria
