= Al Weaver =

English actor (born 1981)

- Born: Alexander Paul Weaver; 3 January 1981 (age 45)
- Education: Guildhall School of Music and Drama (BA)
- Occupations: Actor, writer, producer, director
- Years active: 2002–present

Alexander Paul Weaver (born 3 January 1981) is an English actor, writer, producer and director, best known for his role as curate Leonard Finch in the ITV series Grantchester (2014-present). He is also known as the voice of Rex in Xenoblade Chronicles 2 (2017).

== Background ==
Weaver went to Rivington and Blackrod High School, and graduated with a bachelor's degree in acting from the Guildhall School of Music and Drama in June 2003.

== Career ==
Weaver's first paid theatre role was in Trevor Nunn's 2004 production of Hamlet, at the Old Vic theatre in London. Weaver played the title role on Monday evenings and at all matinees, whilst Ben Whishaw took on the role for evening performances, from Tuesday to Saturday.

British politician Michael Portillo lauded Weaver's interpretation of Hamlet in The New Statesman: "He [Weaver] gave meaning to the poetry, refusing to be rushed in the soliloquies or intimidated by them, varying volume and pace well. Frame by frame, he made credible Hamlet's progression from self-indulgence to nobility, so we could nearly believe Fortinbras' remark that 'he was likely, had he been put on,/To have proved most royally'".

Weaver has appeared in minor roles in Colour Me Kubrick (2005) (uncredited), The Merchant of Venice (2004), Marie Antoinette (2006), Unmade Beds (2009), and Me and Orson Welles (2009). He also played "The Kid" in Doom, Schwob in Colette, and an uncredited Gulf War soldier in Armistice (2014).

His television credits include D.C. Billy Slaven in The Inspector Lynley Mysteries episodes "In Pursuit of a Proper Sinner" and "A Cry for Justice", and National Antiquities Museum employee Andy Galbraith in the Sherlock episode "The Blind Banker". Weaver has also been in Five Days as Josh Fairley, Five Daughters as Tom Alderton, Secret State as Josh Leyton, Southcliffe as Anthony, Life in Squares as young Leonard Woolf, The Smoke as Tom, The Nativity as Thomas, and Personal Affairs as Crawford Crawford.

His theatre credits include Meshak in the Royal National Theatre's 2006-07 production of Helen Edmundson's Coram Boy.

Weaver plays fledgling Anglican curate Leonard Finch in the TV series Grantchester (2014 to present), who assists the Vicar of Grantchester, Sidney Chambers, and later, Will Davenport. He also directed the third episode of season 8.

Radio credits include Bach: The Great Passion, a 2017 biographical radio play by English writer James Runcie, where he played Christian Henrici. Weaver also presents two radio shows at the Boogaloo, a pub based in north London: Film And Telly Stuff, alongside actor Luke Neal, and The Theme's Of Our Youth, with actor Jack Whitam.

In September 2017, the BBC announced he had joined the cast of the mini-series Press.

Weaver is known for his voice role as protagonist Rex in the game Xenoblade Chronicles 2, released in December 2017. He reprised the role for the character's appearance in Super Smash Bros. Ultimate, as well as the trailer revealing Pyra and Mythra as playable characters.

In 2019, a fourth series of Grantchester aired, with Weaver reprising his role as Leonard Finch.

In 2020, Weaver starred as Dr. Rees Wakefield in the choose-your-own-adventure style sci-fi thriller video game The Complex.

== Personal life ==
Tessa Peake-Jones, who played Mrs. Maguire (later, Mrs. Chapman) on Grantchester, was Weaver's mentor while he was studying at the Guildhall School of Music and Drama. He is a bibliophile and a football fan, supporting Liverpool.

== Filmography ==
=== Film ===
Year	Title	Role	Notes
2004	The Merchant of Venice	Stephano	
2005	Planespotting	Steve	Television film
2005	Colour Me Kubrick	Darren	Uncredited
2005	Doom	Mark "Kid" Dantalian	
2006	Marie Antoinette	Charles, Count of Artois	
2006	Viva Blackpool	Vibe	Television film
2008	Me and Orson Welles	Sam Leve	
2009	Unmade Beds	Kevin	
2010	Spoiler	Tom	Short film
2010	Honeymooner	Jon	
2011	Powder	Helmet	
2012	Chemistry	Johan	Short film
2012	The Frontier	Ben	Television film
2013	The Theory of Everything	Hugo John Ellis	Short film
2013	Armistice	Gulf war soldier	Uncredited
2013	Things He Never Said	Paul; also writer and producer	Short film
2015	Kill Your Friends	Bill	
2016	Love Is Thicker Than Water	Adam Berliner	
2017	We Are Tourists	Edward	
2017	The Last Photograph	Colin	
2018	Colette	Schwob	
2018	Macbeth	Banquo	
2018	Blue Iguana	Tommy Tresham	
2018	Peterloo	Magistrate Hulton	
2020	The Complex: Lockdown	Rees Wakefield	
2021	I'm Not in Love (working title: Marriage Material)	Rob Lloyd; also executive producer	
2024	Torch Song	Gabe Alexander	
2024	We Are Tourists	Edward	

=== Television ===
Year	Title	Role	Notes
2002	Brum	Yellow Team	Episode: "Brum the Soccer Hero"
2004	The Inspector Lynley Mysteries	Billy Slaven	2 episodes
2007	Five Days	Josh Fairley	Recurring role; 5 episodes
2008	The Devil's Whore	Christian	Mini-series; 2 episodes
2009	Personal Affairs	Crawford	Mini-series; 4 episodes
2010	Survivors	Kevin	2 episodes
2010	Five Daughters	Tom Alderton	Mini-series; 2 episodes
2010	Sherlock	Andy Galbraith	Episode: "The Blind Banker"
2010	The Nativity	Thomas the Apostle	Mini-series; 4 episodes
2012	Secret State	Joss Leyton	Mini-series; 4 episodes
2013	Southcliffe	Anthony	Mini-series; 4 episodes
2014	The Smoke	Tom	Mini-series; 1 episode
2014-present	Grantchester	Leonard Finch	Series regular; 66 episodes
2015	Life in Squares	Young Leonard Woolf	Mini-series; 2 episodes
2016	The Hollow Crown	Rivers	2 episodes
2018	Press	James Edwards	Series regular; 6 episodes
2019	The Mallorca Files	Richard Webb	Episode: "Number One Fan"
2022	The Chelsea Detective	Simon Turnball	Episode: "The Wages of Sin"
2024	Miss Scarlet and the Duke	Delaware	Episode: "Elysium"
2024	Daddy Issues	Danny	Episode: "Happy Tears"

=== Video games ===
Year	Game	Role	Notes
2017	Xenoblade Chronicles 2	Rex	English version
2020	The Complex	Rees Wakefield	
2021	Super Smash Bros. Ultimate	Rex	DLC, English version
2022	Who Pressed Mute on Uncle Marcus?	Toby	

== Theatre credits ==
Year	Title	Role	Venue	Notes
2004	Hamlet	Prince Hamlet	The Old Vic, London	
2005	All the Ordinary Angels	Lino Raffa	Royal Exchange, Manchester	
2006	Malvolio and His Masters	Sir Andrew Aguecheek	Southwark Playhouse, London	
2006	Coram Boy	Meshak	Olivier Theatre, London	
2007	The Waltz of the Toreadors	Gaston	Chichester Festival Theatre, Chichester	
2007	How to Curse	Nick	Bush Theatre, London	
2009	Toyer	Peter	Arts Theatre, London	
2010	House of Games	Billy Hahn	Almeida Theatre, London	
2010	Bea	Not Gay Ray	Soho Theatre, London	
2011	The Seagull	Konstantin Gavrilovich Treplev	Arcola Theatre, London	
2011	Inadmissible Evidence	Jones	Donmar Warehouse, London	
2013	Rough Cuts		Royal Court Theatre, London	
2013	The Pride	Oliver	Trafalgar Theatre, London	
2018	Moonlight	Jake	Harold Pinter Theatre, London	
