= Luke Massey =

British screenwriter and film director

- Born: Luke Morrison; 12 June 1984 (age 42); Bristol
- Occupations: Film director and screenwriter
- Years active: 1992–present

Luke Massey (born 12 June 1984 as Luke Morrison) is a British screenwriter and film director, known for making movies such as Armistice (2011) and 500 Miles North (2014).

== Early career ==
The Morrison family moved to Stratford-Upon-Avon, where his father Campbell Morrison (1952-2008) worked as an actor with the Royal Shakespeare Company. Luke worked as a camera trainee with the BBC straight from school, and then as D.O.P on several short films for the Royal Shakespeare Company.

In 2008, he wrote and filmed a short film called "Within The Woods" made under £10,000 new "zombie" horror movie. It stars Lorraine Pilkington and James Chalmers. It was filmed at Ragley Hall, Alcester, also in the woods around Wroxton, Banbury, and in Leamington.

In 2011, Luke wrote and directed his first feature, Armistice (originally called Warhouse), starring Joseph Morgan and Matt Ryan. A month after completing Armistice, Luke then started work on his second independent feature, 500 Miles North, starring Joseph Morgan, Matt Ryan, Kevin McNally and Sue Johnson. Luke currently lives in Liverpool.

He also runs a rental/production company called 'Green Manalishi Productions' based in Leamington. His main influences are Sam Raimi, Robert Rodriguez, and Shane Meadows.

== Personal life ==
He has an older brother, Tom.

== Filmography ==
Within The Woods 2008 directed by Luke Massey

=== Feature films ===
Year	Film	Credited as		Rotten Tomatoes
Year	Film	Director	Writer	Rotten Tomatoes
2013	Armistice (was originally known as Warhouse)	Yes	Yes	
2014	500 Miles North	Yes	Yes	
