= Feast of the Baptism of the Lord =

Christian feast day

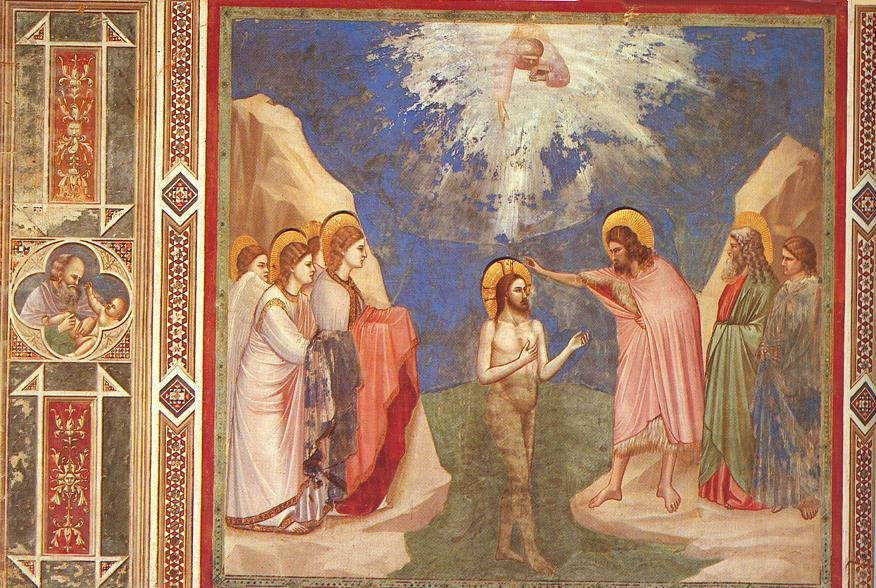
- Baptism of Christ fresco by Giotto di Bondone, c. 1305 (Cappella Scrovegni, Padua, Italy)
- Observed by: Roman Catholic Church; Lutheranism; Anglican Communion
- Significance: Baptism of Jesus
- Date: Sunday following the Epiphany of the Lord; or when Epiphany is celebrated on January 7 or 8, the Monday following it (Occurs in US Dioceses)
- 2025 date: January 12 (US: January 12)
- 2026 date: January 11 (US: January 11)
- 2027 date: January 10 (US: January 10)
- 2028 date: January 9 (US: January 9)
- Related to: Epiphany, Epiphanytide

The Feast of the Baptism of the Lord, or Theophany, is the feast day commemorating the baptism of Jesus in the Jordan River by John the Baptist. Originally the baptism of Christ was celebrated on Epiphany, which commemorates the coming of the Magi, the baptism of Christ, and the wedding at Cana. Over time in the West, however, the celebration of the baptism of the Lord came to be commemorated as a distinct feast from Epiphany, though falling within Epiphanytide. It is celebrated in the Catholic Church, Lutheran churches and Anglican churches on the first Sunday following The Epiphany of Our Lord (January 6). Some Lutheran churches celebrate it on the Sunday before Lent, or Quinquagesima.

== Celebration Eastern Christianity ==
In the Eastern Orthodox, Eastern Lutheran and the Eastern Catholic Churches, the Baptism of the Lord is celebrated as an integral part of the celebration on January 6, the Great Feast of the Theophany. For those churches that follow the traditional Julian calendar, January 6 falls on January 19 of the modern Gregorian calendar (see Epiphany (holiday) and Theophany for details).

== Celebration in Western Christianity ==
=== Catholic Church ===
The Baptism of the Lord is observed as a distinct feast in the Roman rite, although it was originally one of three Gospel events marked by the feast of the Epiphany. Long after the visit of the Magi had in the West overshadowed the other elements commemorated in the Epiphany, Pope Pius XII instituted in 1955 a separate liturgical commemoration of the Baptism.

Currently, the Feast of the Baptism of the Lord is usually celebrated the Sunday after Epiphany. The exception is when Epiphany is observed on January 7th or 8th; this causes the Baptism to be celebrated on the Monday immediately following Epiphany. When celebrated on Sunday, the Feast of the Baptism is part of the Christmas season, but when displaced to Monday it falls in Ordinary Time.

==== History ====
The Tridentine calendar had no feast of the Baptism of the Lord for almost four centuries. Then the feast was instituted, under the denomination "Commemoration of the Baptism of our Lord", for celebration on 13 January as a major double, using for the Office and the Mass those previously said on the Octave of the Epiphany abolished by Pius XII; however, if the Commemoration of the Baptism of Our Lord occurred on Sunday, the Office and Mass were to be those of the Feast of the Holy Family without any commemoration.

In his revision of the calendar five years later, Pope John XXIII kept on 13 January the "Commemoration of the Baptism of our Lord Jesus Christ", with the rank of a second-class feast.

A mere 14 years after the institution of the feast, Pope Paul VI set its date as the first Sunday after January 6 (as early as January 7 or as late as January 13) or, if in a particular country the Epiphany is celebrated on Sunday, January 7 or Sunday, January 8, on Monday, January 8 or Monday, January 9, respectively.

Pope John Paul II initiated the custom on this feast of the reigning Supreme Pontiff baptising babies in the Sistine Chapel.

=== Lutheran churches ===
In the past, the Lutheran churches as with other Western Christian churches, commemorated the Baptism of the Lord on the octave of the Feast of the Epiphany.

The Feast of the Baptism of the Lord is celebrated today in many Lutheran parishes as a separate feast, on the first Sunday after the feast of the Epiphany.

Lutheran churches with Scandinavian history, such as the Evangelical Lutheran Synod celebrate the Baptism of Christ on the final Sunday before Lent, or Quinquagesima Sunday. Chronologically, the Temptation of Jesus, heard on the first Sunday in Lent, immediately follows the Baptism of Jesus. This follows the lectionary which Johannes Bugenhagen included in his church order he brought to Denmark.

=== Anglican Communion ===
In the Church of England, Epiphany may be observed on January 6, or on the Sunday between January 2 and 8. If Epiphany is observed on a Sunday on January 6 or before, the Baptism of Christ is observed on the following Sunday. If the Epiphany is observed on January 7 or 8, the Baptism of Christ is observed on the following Monday, on January 8 or 9. In the Church of England, Ordinary Time does not begin until the day after the Presentation of Christ in the Temple.

In the Episcopal Church [USA], Epiphany is always celebrated on January 6, and the Baptism of the Lord is always celebrated on the following Sunday. It is not clear as to whether or not the Feast of the Baptism of Our Lord is the end of Christmastide for the Episcopal Church. On one hand, the Prayer Book refers to the "Twelve Days of Christmas," and clearly distinguishes between the Christmas and Epiphany seasons, the latter extending until Ash Wednesday. On the other hand, the Prayer Book allows for the continued use of Christmas prayers and readings on the weekdays following the Epiphany and leading up to the Baptism of Our Lord. Further, the Epiphany and the Baptism of Christ are viewed as specially connected, allowing the interpretation that Christmastide does extend through and ends with the Feast of Our Lord's Baptism on the Sunday following the Epiphany.

=== Methodist churches ===
The Feast of the Baptism of the Lord is celebrated in many Methodist parishes on the second Sunday in January, after the feast of the Epiphany has already occurred.
