= House blessing =

Rite intended to protect inhabitants of a home

House blessings (also known as house healings, house clearings, house cleansings and space clearing) are rites intended to protect the inhabitants of a house or apartment from misfortune, whether before moving into it or to "heal" it after an occurrence. Many religions have house blessings of one form or another.

== Christianity ==
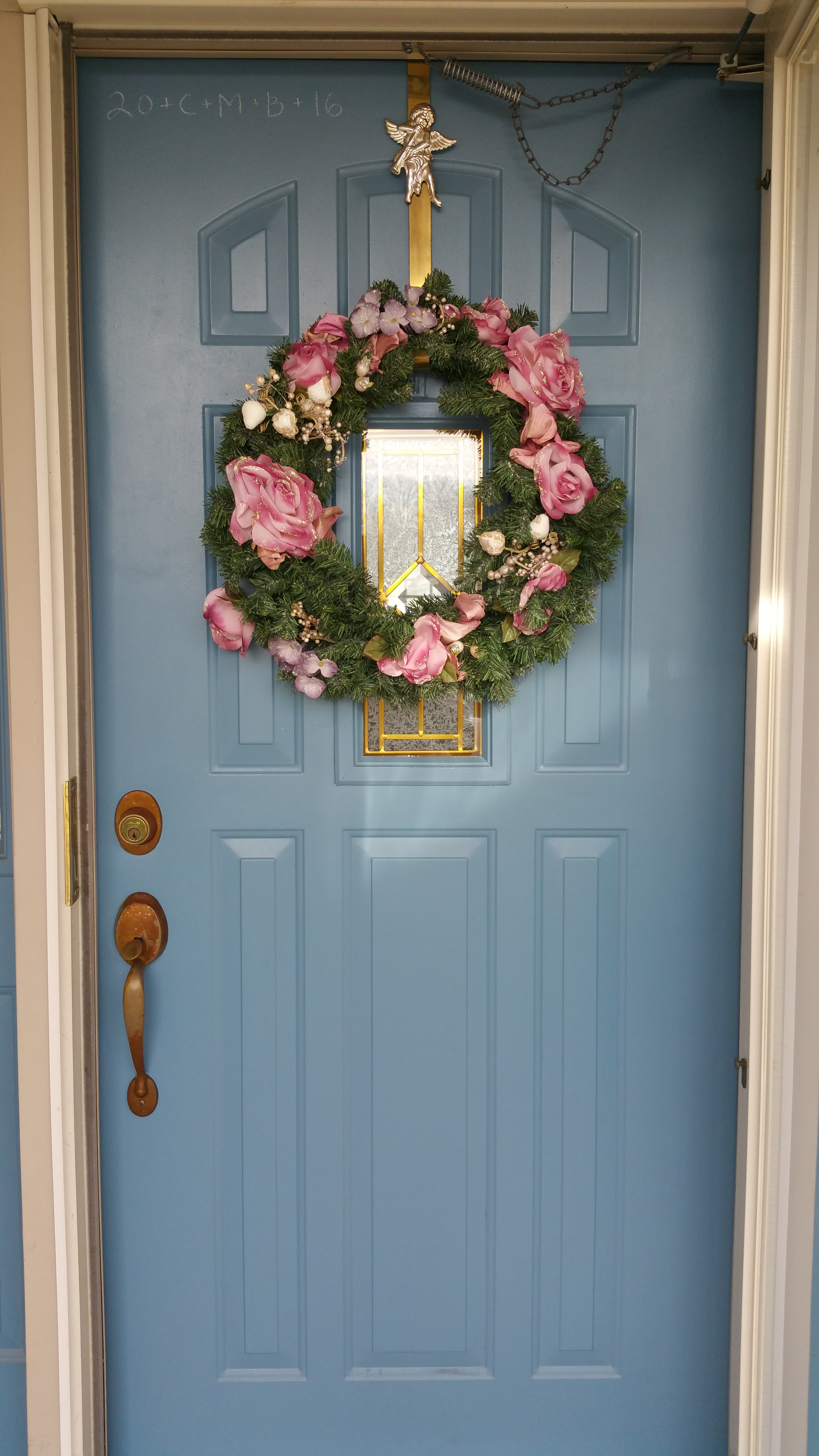
A Christmas wreath adorning a home, with the top left hand corner of the front door chalked for Epiphanytide and the wreath hanger bearing a placard of the Angel Gabriel

In Christianity, house blessing is an ancient tradition that can be found in Roman Catholicism, Orthodox Christianity, and some branches of Protestantism. In Roman Catholicism, Lutheranism, Anglicanism, Methodism and Orthodoxy, they are usually performed by a pastor who may sprinkle holy water (depending on denominational tradition) as he walks through every room of the house, accompanied by the occupants of the house, whilst praying for the occupants.

Christians of various denominations have traced with holy oil the sign of the cross onto lintels, doors or windows of their dwellings in order to invite God's blessing and protection on the home. Prayers such as the following are used for the same:

With the sign of this cross I am making a declaration that this house belongs to the Lord Jesus Christ that no sickness, death, thief or evil can enter this home. This oil is a symbol of the blood of Jesus Christ. No weapons that are formed against us or this property shall prosper and any destruction must pass over us, in Jesus name. We are safe and protected under the blood of Jesus.

House blessings date back to the early days of Christianity, and in Catholicism, the rite takes the form of a prayer, with intercessions and several benedictions; blessed salt and incense may also be used. The Methodist The Book of Worship for Church and Home (1965) contains "An Office for the Blessing of a Dwelling". Matthew 2:11 says:

"On coming to the house, they saw the child with his mother Mary, and they bowed down and worshiped him. Then they opened their treasures and presented him with gifts of gold and of incense and of myrrh."

Consequently, Anglicans, Catholics, Lutherans, Methodists and Orthodox Christians often have their homes blessed at Epiphany, on January 6; this blessing often starts with the Christian custom of chalking the door and prayer at the home altar. The custom of the Epiphanytide house blessing commemorates the visitation of the Magi to the child Jesus.

House blessings in the Pennsylvania Dutch Country take the form of printed cards, framed and hung on the walls of the sitting room, and trace their origins to similar practices in The Netherlands and Belgium. Blessings, employed by Catholics and Protestants alike, usually incorporate a picture of Christ's crucifixion and a prayer "to the Sweet Name of Jesus and His dear saints". Many of these were printed in Belgium, and Turnhout.

In Alsace, such blessings have origins in the Pestbriefe 'pestilence letters' of the Middle Ages, sold at fairs to those wishing to protect themselves from disease, and the Feuerbriefe 'fire letters' brought back by pilgrims from Cologne and containing intercessory prayers to the Three Kings (usually with the letters CMB, for Caspar, Melchior, Balthasar, incorporated somewhere into the design) for God protecting their homes from fire and disaster. Other blessings, found in Alsace and brought to Pennsylvania, include blessings of the entranceway to a house, stable blessings invoking Saint Leonard or Saint Blasius, blessings against Feuer und Brand addressed to Saint Agatha, and even blessings for house pets addressed to Saint Florentius.

The Church of Jesus Christ of Latter-day Saints also participates in house blessings, referring to them as home dedications.

== Hinduism ==
In the Hinduism, a house blessing is always conducted before the people move in. With a new house, this is after construction is finished, but in a purchased house it will be done after purchase but before moving in. The blessing is performed by a Hindu priest and varies greatly throughout India. In Gujarat, the blessing mainly consists of performing abhisheka (ritual milk-bathing) to a murti, often of Lord Ganesha, which is performed by the house-holders while the priest chants mantras. In Tamil Nadu, the traditional house blessing comprises the chanting of mantras, the escorting of a cow through all of the rooms, and (finally) the boiling of some of the cow's milk in the kitchen. Cow urine (komiyam) is also used for bathing.

== Buddhism ==
Mahayana Buddhism

In Han traditions of Mahayana Buddhism—practiced in China, Taiwan, and the rest of the Sinophone world—house blessings involve asperging the new residence with water that is consecrated with the Great Compassion Mantra (Chinese: 大悲咒); this ritual is known as sajing (灑淨) and may be conducted by lay believers or invited monastics. In addition, before inhabiting the new residence, believers may arrange for a special memorial service (chaojian, 超薦) to be conducted at a temple for the new property's dizhu shen; this is done in hopes that the landlord god may convert to Buddhism, become a benevolent spirit if he is not already, and be reborn into Amitabha's Pure Land.

The Kojangi house blessing ceremony requires one fresh whole red fish, rice with azuki beans (sekihan), a small bottle of sake, an unopened bag of rice, and a new bag of rock salt.`

In the Gurung culture of Nepal, most families have a house blessing twice a year in March and October performed by a lama priest. At the October blessing, a new set of prayer flags are hung at the house (typically on a bamboo pole), with a blessing scarf tied at the top of the prayer flags and a mixture of grains in a bag tied at the bottom.

== Mandaeism ==
On Dehwa d-Šišlam Rabba (Festival of the Great Shishlam, on the 6th–7th days of Daula, corresponding to Epiphany in Christianity), Mandaean priests visit households and give them myrtle wreaths to hang on their houses for the rest of the year to protect against evil. The households also donate alms to the priests.

== See also ==
- Exorcism in Christianity
- First footing
- Polaznik
- Sacramentals
- Smudging
- Spiritual warfare
