= Epiphany season =

Liturgical period, immediately following the Christmas season

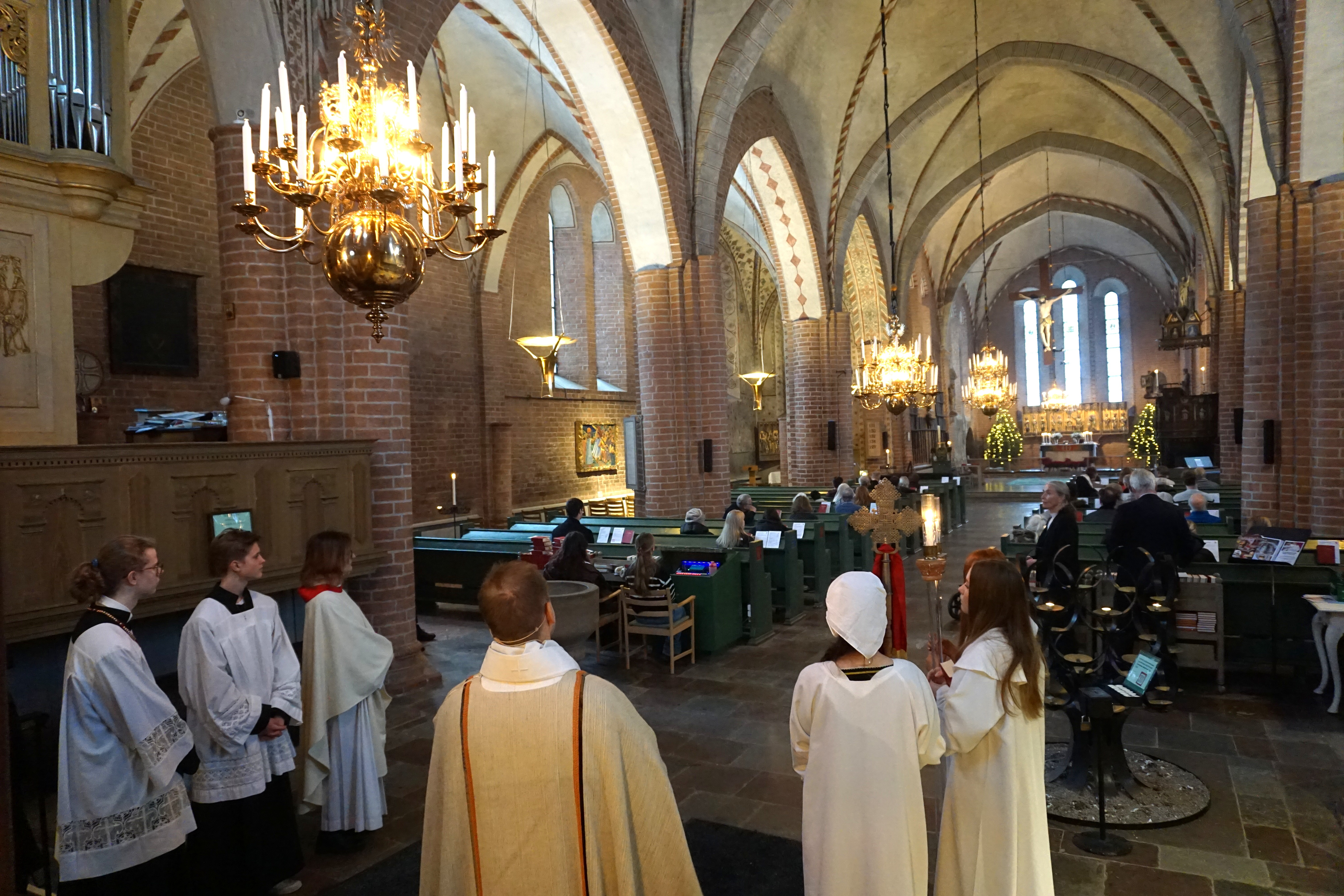
The priest and altar servers of Saint Mary's Evangelical-Lutheran Church standing in the narthex of during recessional hymn at the end of Epiphany Day Mass

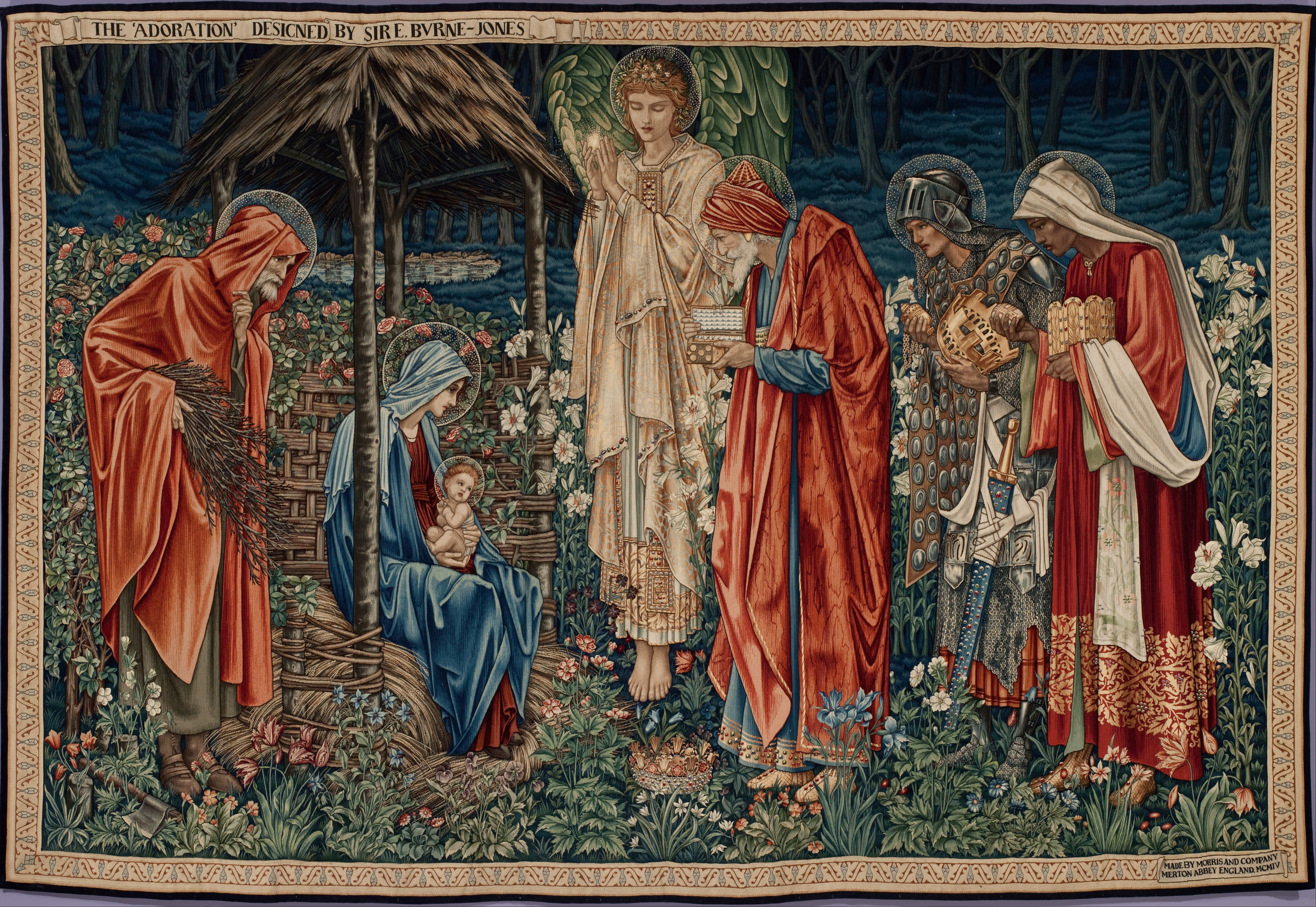
The Adoration of the Magi by Edward Burne-Jones (1904)

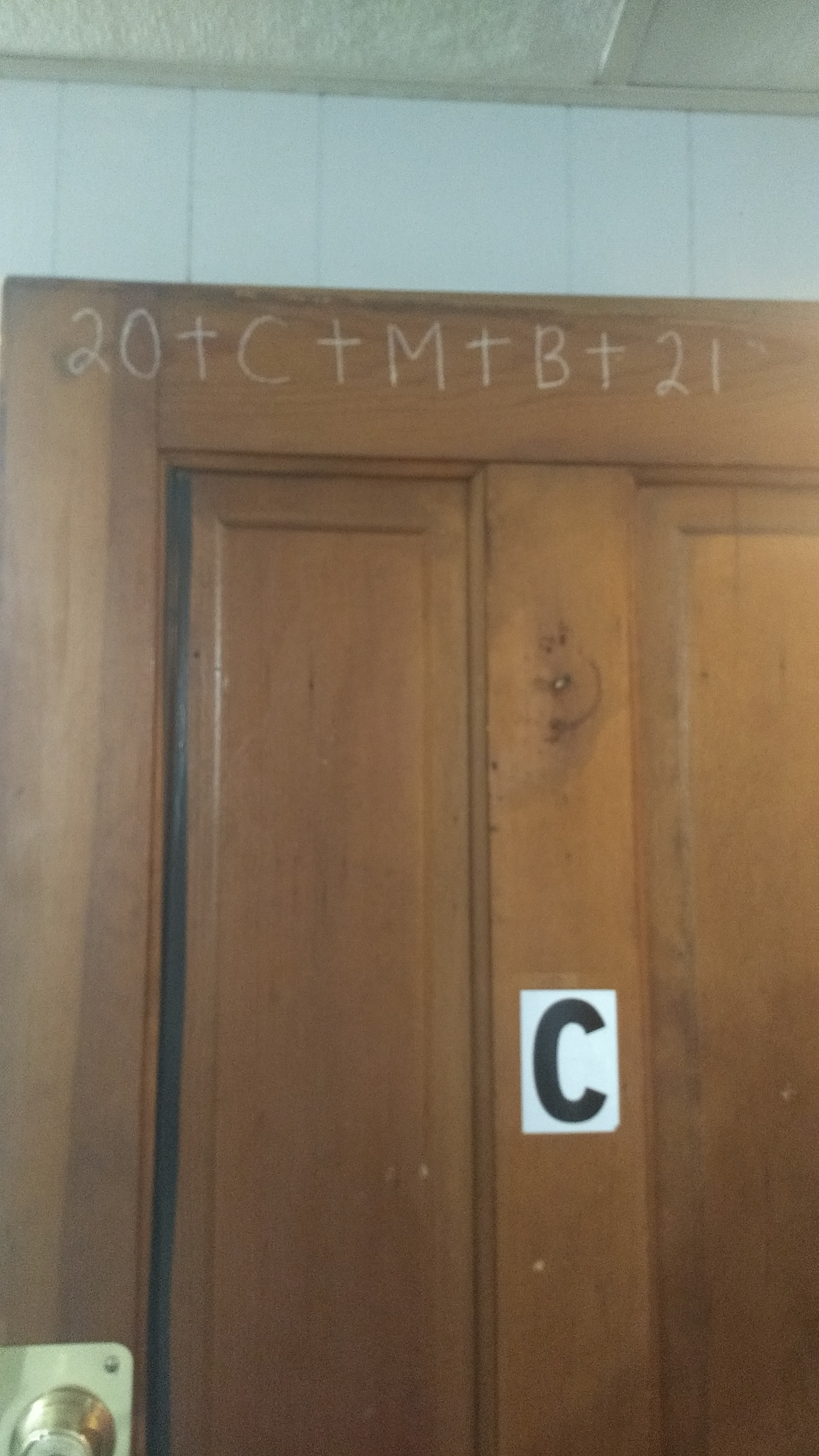
The Epiphanytide tradition of chalking the door involves writing C✝M✝B (representing the names of the Three Wise Men as well as the Christian prayer Christus mansionem benedicat) with the year flanking both sides on one's door, as seen here on an apartment door in the Midwestern US.

The Epiphany season, also known as Epiphanytide or the time of Sundays after Epiphany, is a liturgical period, celebrated by many Christian Churches, which immediately follows the Christmas season. It begins on Epiphany Day, and ends at various points (such as Candlemas) as defined by those denominations. The typical liturgical color for the day of Epiphany is white, and the typical color for Epiphany season is green.

Popular Epiphanytide customs include Epiphany singing, chalking the door and families inviting their pastor to bless their home.

== Western Christianity ==
=== Roman Rite ===
==== Ordinary Form ====
The Ordinary Form of the Roman Rite of the Catholic Church regards the time after Epiphany and before Ash Wednesday as part of Ordinary Time.

Some Catholics believe the Christmas Season ends on the Feast of the Baptism of the Lord, which is typically celebrated on the Sunday after Epiphany. Although Epiphany is not a distinct season, the Ordinary Form does have specific Mass collects that are used from Epiphany onward. Because Epiphany is, in many places, transferred to the Sunday between January 2 and 8 inclusive, the period during which the Epiphany texts are used forms a de facto octave between the Sunday of Epiphany and the Sunday of the Baptism of the Lord.

==== Extraordinary Form ====
In traditionalist Catholic communities that use the General Roman Calendar of 1960 as part of the Extraordinary Form authorized by Summorum Pontificum, Epiphany is celebrated with a de facto octave from January 6 to the Feast of the Baptism of the Lord on January 13, although the octave was nominally removed in the calendar reforms of 1955. The Sundays which follow are designated "Sundays after Epiphany" or "Time after Epiphany" until the start of Pre-Lent.

==== Ordinariate Use ====
In 2015, the Catholic Church authorized a Use of the Roman Rite for the three Personal Ordinariates for former Anglicans. The Ordinariate Use explicitly includes a period called Epiphanytide, which runs from the Monday after the Feast of the Baptism of the Lord until the day before Ash Wednesday.

=== Moravianism ===
In the Moravian Church, the Epiphany season runs until the Sunday before Ash Wednesday. While white is the liturgical colour used for the Feast of the Epiphany itself, the Sundays during the rest of the season use green.

=== Lutheranism ===
In Lutheranism, Epiphanytide runs from Epiphany Day until Septuagesima Sunday—three Sundays before Shrove Tuesday—(as with the Evangelical Lutheran Church in Denmark), or from Epiphany Day until the day before Ash Wednesday (as with the Evangelical Lutheran Church in America).

=== Anglicanism ===
There are provided six "Sundays after Epiphany" in the Book of Common Prayer, to be used for the varying number of Sundays after Epiphany until Septuagesima. In 2000, the Church of England introduced into its liturgy an optional Epiphany season by approving the Common Worship series of services as an alternative to those in the Book of Common Prayer. This optional season begins with Evening Prayer on the day before the Epiphany (which may be celebrated on January 6 or on the Sunday between January 2 and 8) and ends on Candlemas, which celebrates the Presentation of Jesus at the Temple. (which may be celebrated on February 2 or on the Sunday between January 28 and February 3).

=== Methodism ===
In Methodism, the Epiphany season runs from Epiphany Day until Ash Wednesday, the first day of Lent. White is liturgical colour for Epiphany Day itself, as well as for the Baptism of the Lord and the Feast of the Transfiguration, while green is the liturgical colour used for the rest of the season.

== Eastern Christianity ==
=== Greek Rite ===
In the Greek Rite (used by various Orthodox and Byzantine Catholic churches), the Feast of the Epiphany takes place on January 6. The Liturgy of St. Basil is celebrated with Vespers on the eve of the feast; and the Vigil is made up of Great Compline and Matins. The Divine Liturgy tells the story of Jesus's baptism. After Vespers and the Divine Liturgy, the Great Blessing of the Water takes place. The celebrant immerses the cross into the water three times and then blesses the people with the water. It is customary in theses churches for the faithful to drink the water and to take it home for use throughout the year.

=== East Syriac Rite ===
In the East Syriac Rite (used by churches such as the Syro-Malabar Church), this period is called the Season of Epiphany, also known by its Syriac transliteration Denha. This season begins on the Sunday between January 2 and 6, or on January 6 itself if no such Sunday exists. The season runs until the first Sunday of Lent, which begins seven weeks before Easter (three days earlier than it does in Western Christianity).

The rite celebrates the following feast days on sequential Fridays during Epiphany season:

1. St. John the Baptist
2. Sts. Peter and Paul
3. The Evangelists
4. St. Stephen
5. The Greek Doctors (Diodorus, Theodorus and Nestorius)
6. The Syriac Doctors (Aprem, Narsai and Abraham)
7. The Patron of the Church
8. Commemoration of the Dead

Because the length of the Season of Epiphany is variable, later Friday feasts are sometimes moved to earlier weeks.

The Three Days' Lent occurs during this season.

=== West Syriac Rite ===
In the West Syriac Rite (used by the Maronite Church, the Syriac Orthodox Church, the Syriac Catholic Church and various Malankara Churches of India), the season begins on January 6 on the Feast of the Baptism of the Lord, called Denho ("appearance" or "sunrise") in West Syriac dialect. For some Syriac churches, this season may be the traditional time of reception of catechumens into the Church. In Maronite culture many people wait to have their babies initiated (i.e., baptized and chrismated) on or after Denho.
