= Christmas cake =

Baked sweet food served during Christmas

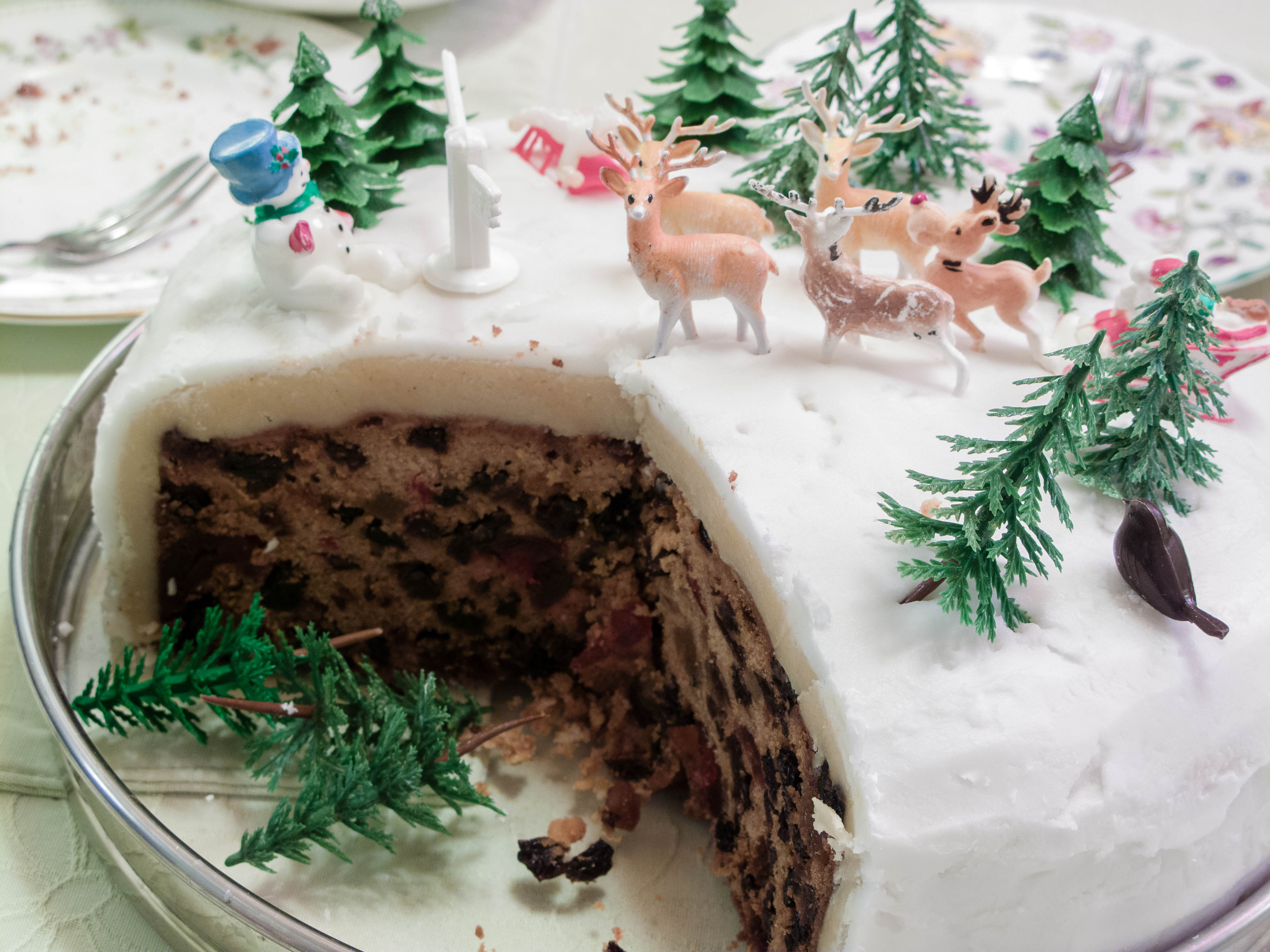
British-style with marzipan and icing

Christmas cake is a type of cake, often fruitcake, served at Christmas time in many countries.

== British variations ==
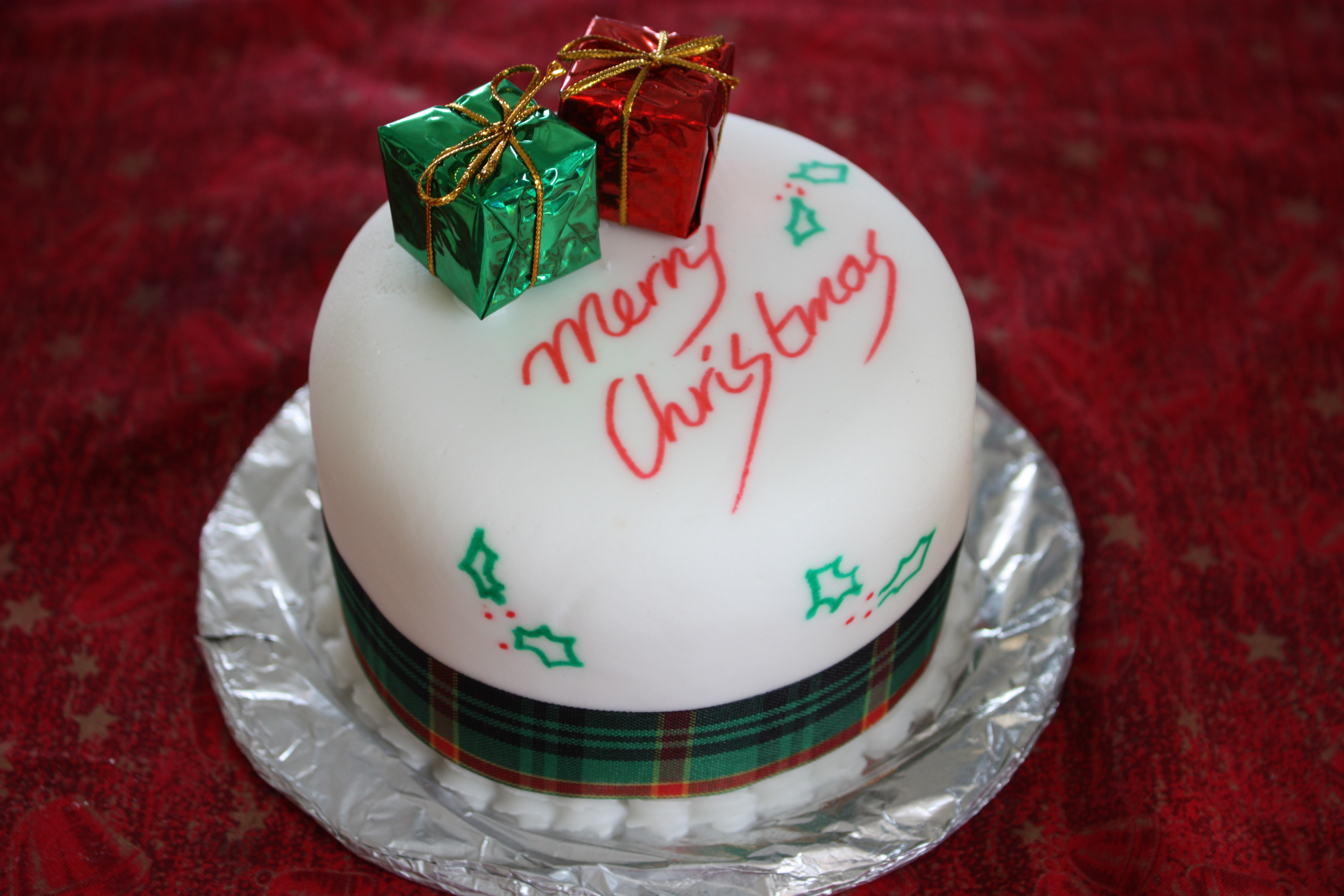
A neatly decorated Christmas cake

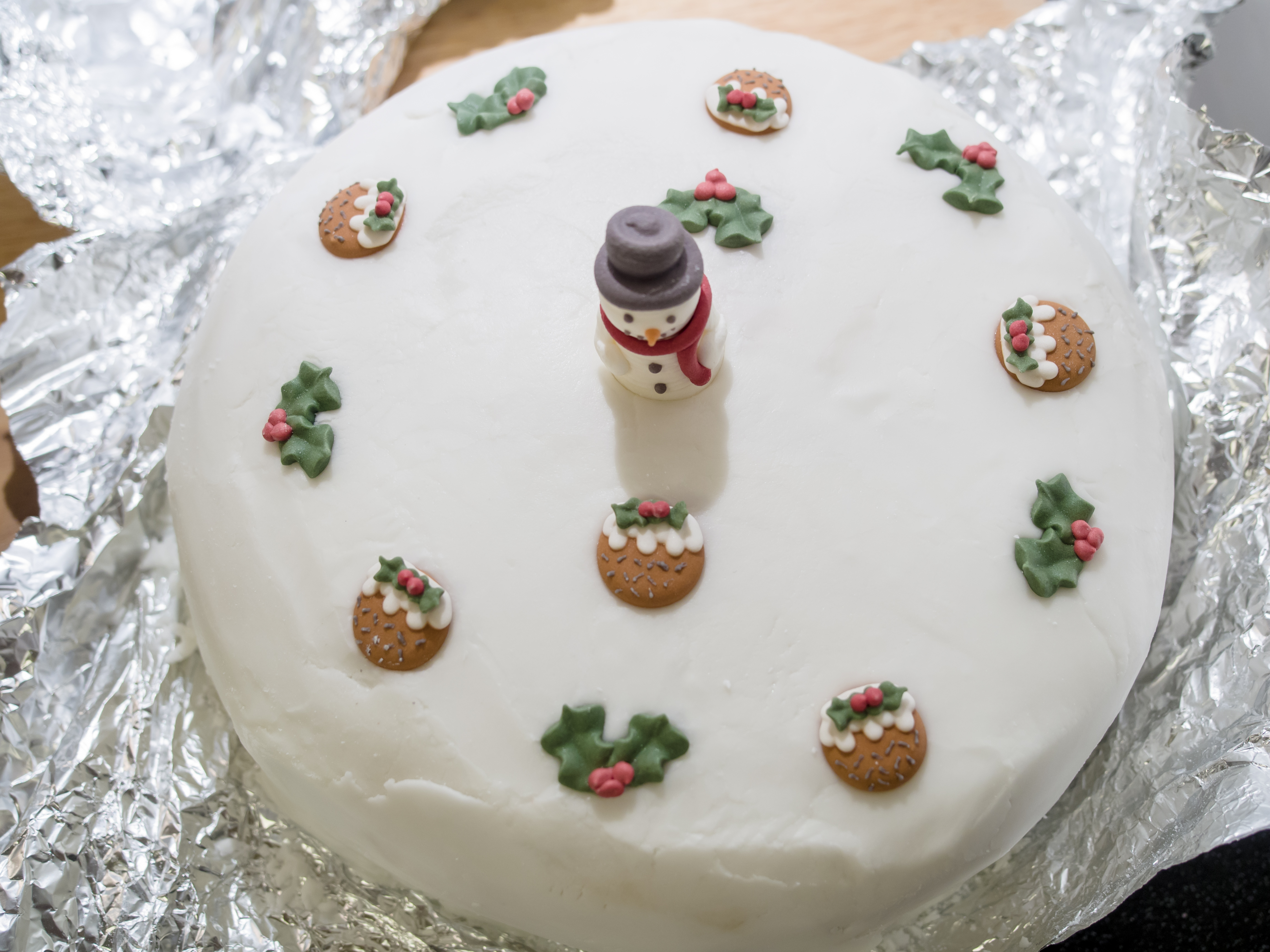
White Christmas cake

Christmas cake is an English tradition that began as plum porridge. A traditional English Christmas cake is made with moist Zante currants, sultanas (golden raisins) and raisins which have been soaked in brandy, rum, whisky or sherry. The cake may be covered in layers of marzipan, then icing and is usually decorated, often with plaid ribbon bands and Christmas models such as snowmen, fir trees or Father Christmas.

A Scottish speciality is the traditional Christmas cake, the "Whisky Dundee". As the name implies, the cake originated in Dundee, and is made with Scotch whisky. It is a light and crumbly cake, and light on fruit and candied peel; only currants, raisins, sultanas and cherries. There is also the Scottish black bun, of a similar recipe using whisky and often caraway seeds, eaten on Hogmanay.

Aside from candied cherries, some Christmas cake recipes call for angelica for green colour.

Coins were also occasionally added to Christmas cakes, as well as Christmas puddings, as good luck touch pieces. The usual choices were silver 3d piece, or sixpences, sometimes wrapped in greaseproof paper packages.

In Yorkshire, Christmas cake, as with other types of fruit cake, is usually not iced, and is eaten with Wensleydale.

A cake that may also be served at Christmas time in the United Kingdom, in addition to the traditional Christmas cake, is the cake known as a "Yule Log, or chocolate log". This is a Swiss roll that is coated in chocolate, resembling a log.

The Christmas cake largely displaced the previously popular Twelfth-night cake during the Victorian era.

== In other countries ==
=== North America ===
In the United States and Canada, some people give fruitcakes as gifts at Christmas time, but they are not often called Christmas cakes.

=== Asia ===
In India, Christmas cakes are traditionally a fruit cake with many variants. Allahabadi cake is famous for its rich taste and texture. Many smaller and more traditional Christian bakeries add alcohol, usually rum, in the cake.

In Sri Lanka, Christmas cakes use treacle instead of cane sugar and include spices like nutmeg, cinnamon, and black pepper.

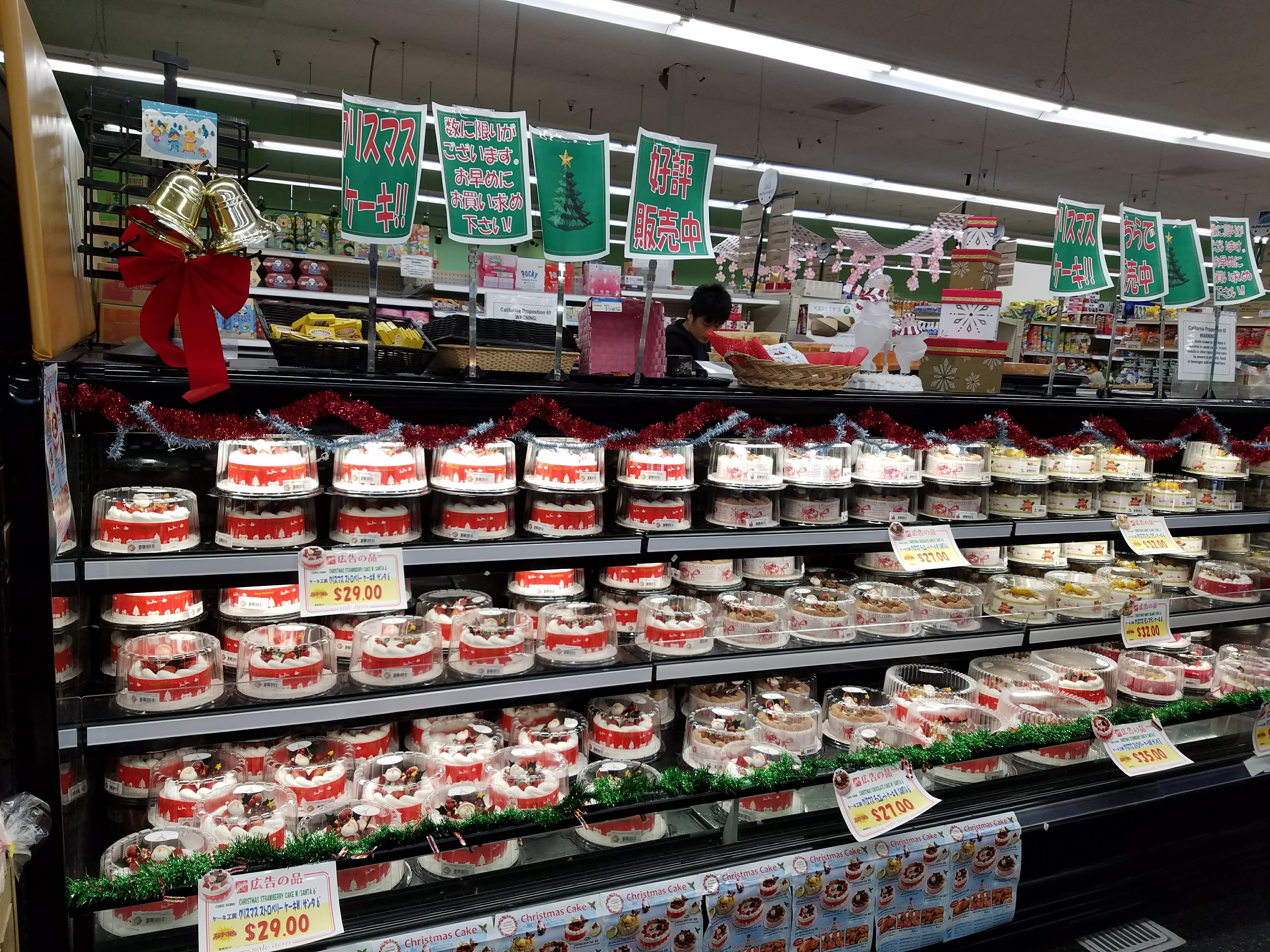
Japanese style Christmas cakes in a display case at a Nijiya Market (San Diego, 2017)

In Japan, Christmas cake is traditionally eaten on Christmas Eve. The cake is simply a sponge cake, frosted with whipped cream, often decorated with strawberries, and usually topped with Christmas chocolates or other seasonal fruits, and a Santa Claus decoration. Christmas cakes of this style were originally released by Fujiya, and was popularized when they began sales at Ginza, the central commercial district in Tokyo. This was during the time when Japan was going through massive waves of Westernization, particularly by the upper elite class. Members of the upper class, who had a strong penchant for Western cultures in general, ate Western style desserts as a delicacy. Thus, being a Western style dessert, Christmas cakes were associated with the idea of Western modernity and social status. Therefore, it was a major hit when the Christmas cakes were commercialized and became more affordable to the general public. Different shapes and styles of Christmas cakes are released across the countless numbers of confectionery stores in the country; the cakes are no longer tied down to the traditional form of round white cakes with strawberries and Santa Claus on top. The Christmas cakes today are symbolized as a ritual of Christmas celebration; specifically, the act of sharing the cake with family or friends.

In the Philippines, Christmas cakes are bright rich yellow pound cakes with macerated nuts or fruitcakes of the British fashion. Both are soaked in copious amounts of brandy or rum mixed with a simple syrup of palm sugar and water. Traditionally, civet musk is added, but rosewater or orange flower water is more common now, as civet musk has become very expensive. These liquor-laden cakes can usually stay fresh for many months provided they are handled properly. Another traditional Filipino Christmas cake is the crema de fruta, which is a sponge cake layered with sweet custard or whipped cream, gelatin or gulaman (agar), and various preserved or fresh fruits, including mangoes, pineapples, cherries, and strawberries.

=== Europe ===
In Cyprus, Christmas cake is much like the UK and is served on Christmas Day. It is the first treat the locals serve to their guests.

In Germany, Stollen, a traditional German fruitcake, is popular. During the Christmas season, it's also called Weihnachtsstollen or Christstollen.

In Italy, Panettone, a sweet bread with a distinct cupola shape, is traditionally eaten at Christmas. It contains raisins and candied citrus fruit and is prepared meticulously over several days. Pandoro is a typically Veronese product traditionally shaped like a frustum with an eight-pointed star section. The "Pandolce Genovese" is also a famous Christmas cake. The name "Genovese" refers to its city of origin, Genoa. It is similar to a fruitcake, but not as tall and crumblier.

In France, Belgium, Switzerland, French Canada, Luxembourg, and Lebanon, a Bûche de noël (Yule log) is the traditional Christmas cake. They are light sponge cakes covered with a layer of butter cream flavoured with chocolate, coffee and Grand Marnier. Then it is rolled and covered with another layer of butter cream, which is streaked and sprinkled with caster sugar to simulate a log of wood covered with snow. Yule Logs are often garnished with Christmas-themed sugar or plastic decorations. Its origin is the large wooden log called Yule Log that was burned in the hearth for several days at Christmas time from at least the Middle Ages throughout Europe and a French pastry chef to represent in the form of dessert in the 19th century. It contains no fruit.

In Portugal and Brazil, Bolo Rei, which translates to "King Cake" in English, is a traditional Portuguese and Brazilian Christmas cake. It is typically eaten during the Christmas season and is known for its rich and sweet flavor. The cake is round with a hole in the center, resembling a crown. It is often decorated with candied fruits, nuts, and powdered sugar.

The Bolo Rei is made with a rich dough that includes ingredients like eggs, sugar, butter, and sometimes port wine or brandy for flavor. It may also contain nuts, candied fruits, and raisins. The hole in the center is usually filled with a variety of dried fruits and nuts.

In Portugal, it is a popular tradition to include a fava bean in the cake. Whoever finds the bean in their slice is considered to have good luck for the coming year. Additionally, a small trinket or figurine is sometimes hidden in the cake, and the person who finds it is said to be the king or queen of the celebration.

Bolo Rei is often eaten with family and friends during the Christmas season, and it holds cultural significance in Portuguese and Brazilian holiday traditions.

In Eastern Europe, such as Moldova and Romania, variations of Pasca and Cozonac are made for the Christmas and New Year Holiday. Other variations such as Kulich are made in Russia and Paska in Ukraine, and other Eastern European countries. They are enriched type of breads that, similar to the Panettone, may contain or not dry fruits and other desired fillings.

== Japanese metaphor ==
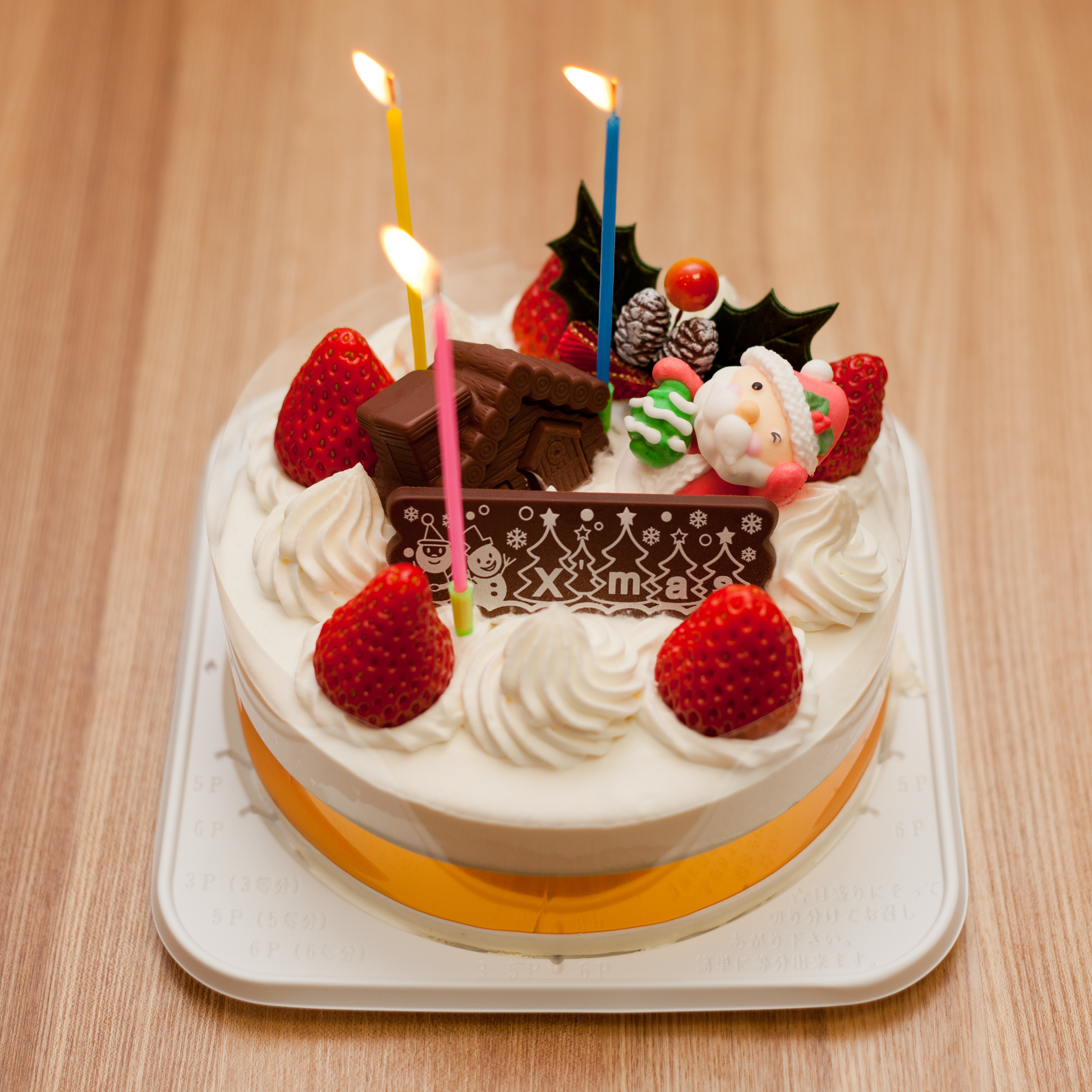
A Japanese strawberry cake decorated as a Christmas cake, frosted with whipped cream and garnished with whole strawberries and chocolate decorations

Christmas is a particularly busy secular holiday for patisseries in Japan, where Christmas cakes are created in a wide variety of flavours, ingredients and colours.

In Japan, women had traditionally been expected to marry at a young age, and those who were unmarried after the age of 25 were metaphorically referred to as "(unsold) Christmas cakes" (クリスマスケーキ) in reference to items which are still unsold after the 25th. The term first became popular during the 1980s but has since become less common because Japanese women today can remain unmarried with somewhat less stigmatization. An equivalent term does, however, still exist that hearkens to the "unsold" nature of unmarried women, urenokori (売れ残り, 'unsold goods').

== See also ==
- Christmas pudding
- Simnel cake
- List of almond dishes
