= Podłaźniczka =

Christmas ornament

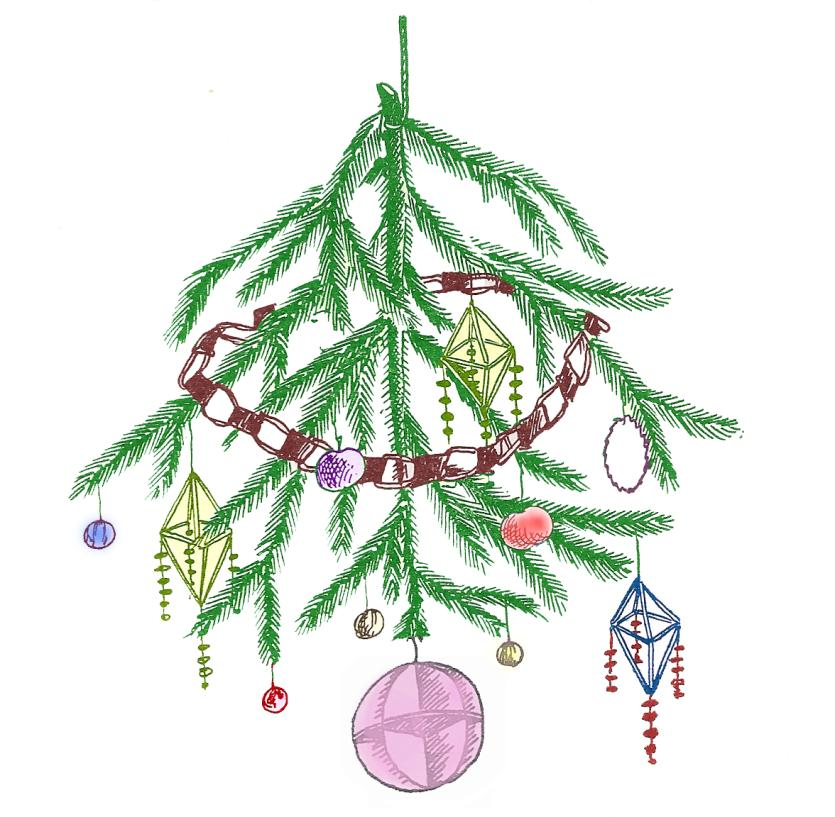
A drawing of a podłaźniczka from the Lesser Poland region

Podłaźniczka, polazňička is a traditional Polish and Slovak Christmas decoration. It was made from branches or the top of a conifer tree turned upside down, which was then decorated with colored paper cutouts (wycinanki), candies, apples, nuts, typical Polish świats, or stars and crosses made of straw. The podłaźniczka was then hung from the ceiling rafters over the Wigilia dinner table on Christmas Eve.

== History ==
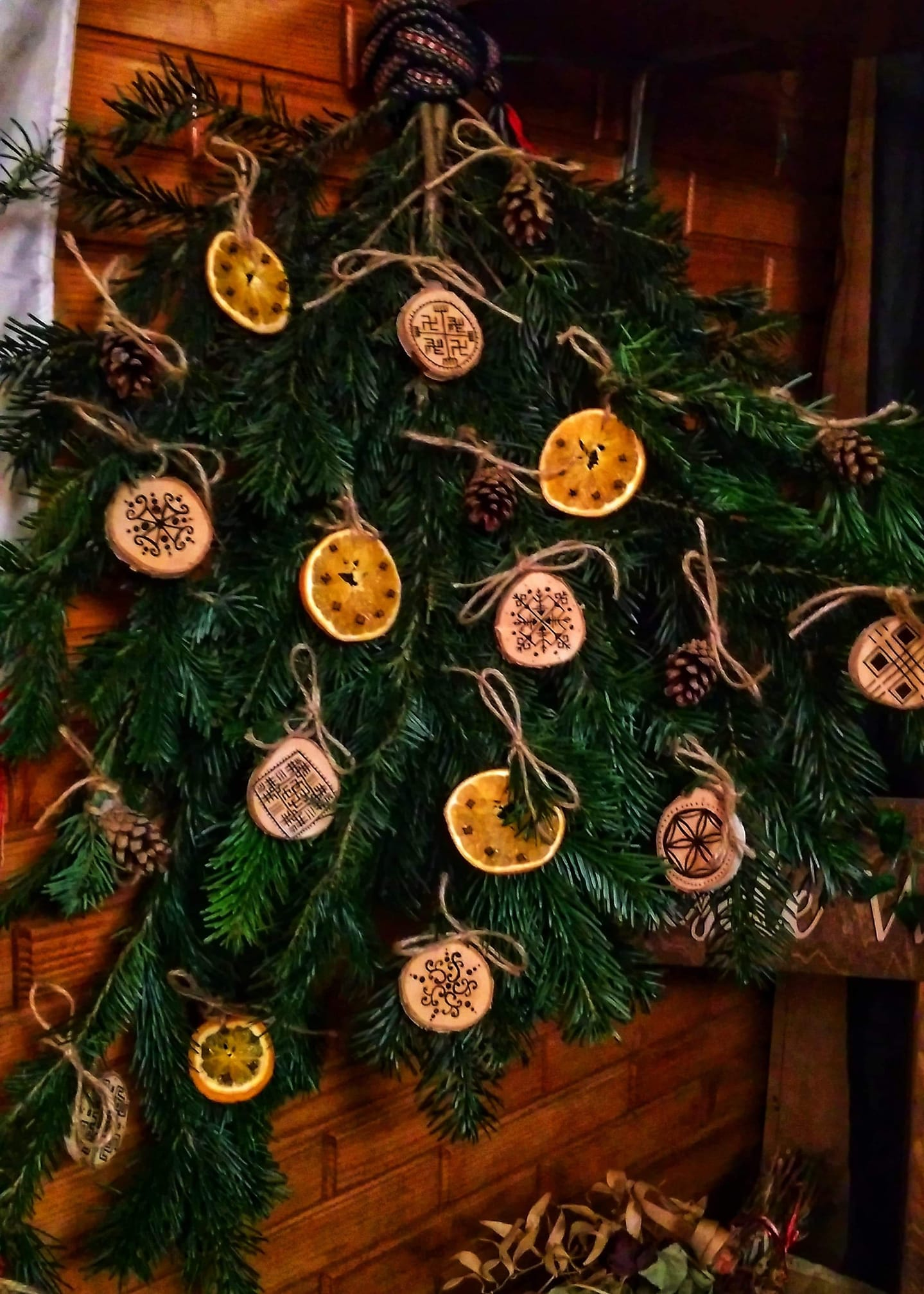
A podłaźniczka decorated with Slavic pagan motifs

The tradition of hanging a podłaźniczka dates back to an ancient Slavic custom of suspending a decorated branch of fir, spruce, or pine from the ceiling rafters, during the time of the Koliada winter festival. The custom of podłaźniczka is also connected to a later folk tradition of the połaźnik. The połaźnik was the first guest to visit a house on Christmas Eve, often bringing with them a decorated evergreen branch. This custom also existed in Slovakia and Bulgaria; in Lemko tradition, the didok was brought instead. In Serbia, such a branch was called šumka od položenjca (Serbian Cyrillic: шумка од положења), or polaznikova šumka (Serbian Cyrillic: полазникова шумка).

== Poland ==
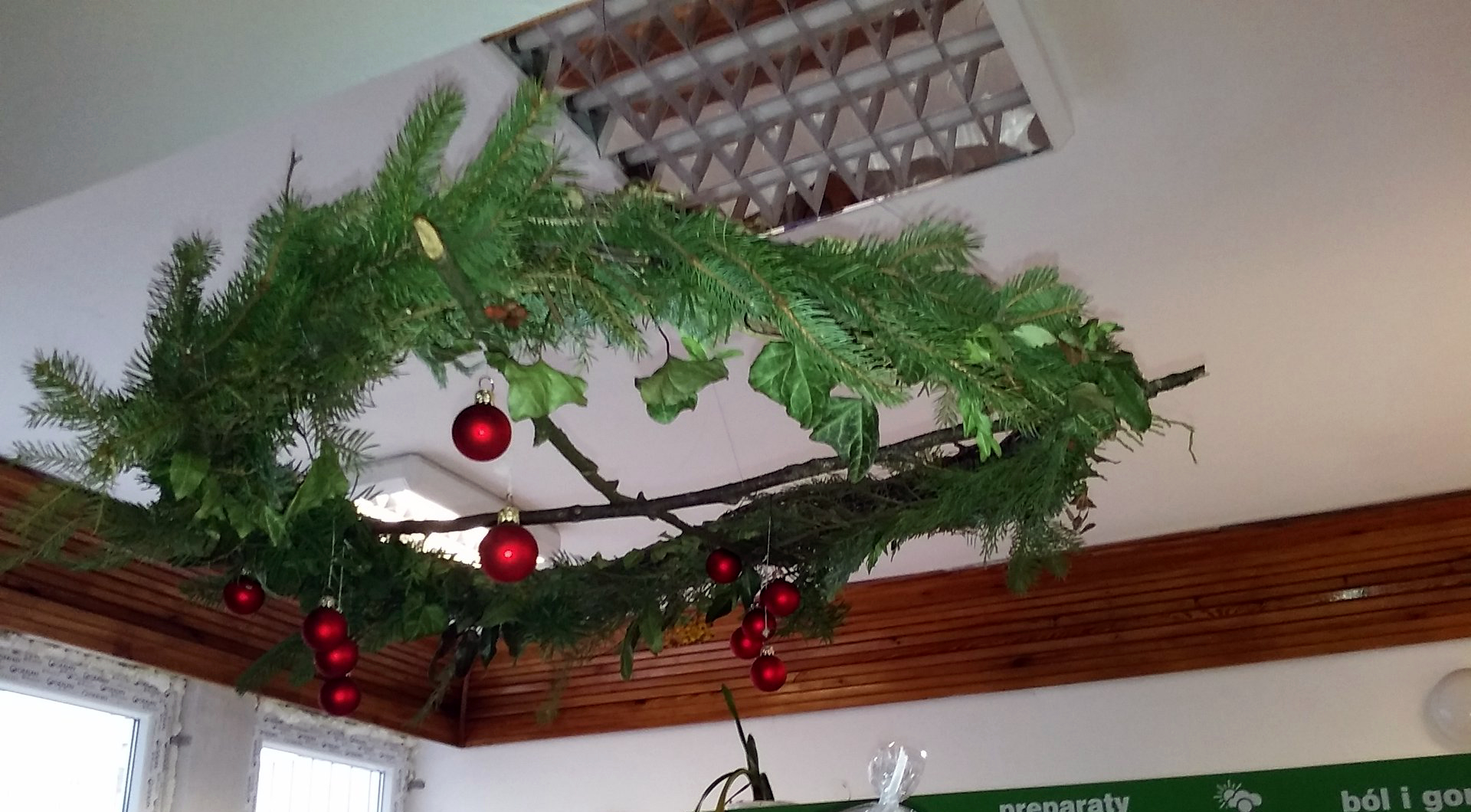
A ringed podlazniczka

In Poland, the podłaźniczka was known mainly in the regions of Lesser Poland (particularly in the Goral lands) and Upper Silesia. The podłaźniczka was made in various ways, it could be a conifer tree branch, a conifer tree treetop turned upside down, or a riddle (przetak) ring to which evergreen twigs were attached. The podłaźniczka was attached to a ceiling rafter, often directly above the Christmas Eve dinner table, or in a sacred corner. Podłaźniczka is considered to be the prototype of modern Christmas tree in Poland.. Podłaźniczka is the precursor of the modern Christmas tree. It’s tradition dates back to the ancient pre- Christian Slavic times.

The podłaźniczka was usually adorned with decorations made from colored paper cutouts, and światy, which were pieces of very thin opłatek flakes wafer joined together. The wafer was used to make various shapes, such as snowflakes, crosses, stars, etc. They were made on the day of Christmas Eve (Polish: Wigilia (Bożego Narodzenia)), which gave rise to another name for this ornament: wilijki. Sometimes światy became an independent decoration, in which case they were separately hung under the ceiling beams. Also, the podłaźniczka was decorated with candies, apples, cookies, conifer cones, nuts, or gilded flax seeds, and later in the 20th century with baubles. The podłaźniczka was supposed to bring prosperity and good luck to the household, and protect farm animals from wolves and diseases. A straw pająk was a similar decoration.

The podłaźniczka was also called połaźniczka, połaźnik, podłaźnik, podłaźnica, jutka, sad, sad rajski, boże drzewko, rajskie drzewko, wiecha, and gaik depending on the locale.

== Slovakia ==
In Slovakia, the ornament called polazňička was also known – it was a straw hen (e.g. in the upper Spiš region, where it was hung over the Christmas table), which symbolically corresponded to a green conifer ornament, Christmas tree, or a branch of coniferous tree brought by a polaznik. This was also the name of the ritual Christmas bread. In the Slovak-Moravian borderland, polazňička was called "happiness", which is related to the Polish belief that podłaźniczka brings good luck.

== See also ==
- Didukh
- Badnjak
- Koliada
- Saturnalia
- Yule

== Bibliography ==
- Fischer, Adam (1934). Etnografja słowiańska (in Polish) (3 ed.). Książnica-Atlas.
- Horák, Gejza (1955). Nárečie Pohorelej (in Slovak). Vydavateľstvo Slovenskej akadémie vied.
- Lebeda, Agnieszka (2002). Drożdż, Anna (ed.). Komentarze do Polskiego Atlasu Etnograficznego (in Polish). Vol. 6. Wiedza i wierzenia ludowe. Polskie Towarzystwo Ludoznawcze. ISBN 9788387266851.
- Michalikowa, Lidia; Chrząstowska, Zofia; Chrząstowski, Stanisław (1974). Folklor Lachów Sądeckich (in Polish). Vol. 2. Centralny Ośrodek Metodyki Upowszechniania Kultury.
- Muzeum Etnograficzne (1966). Rocznik (in Polish). Vol. I–III. Kraków: Polskie Towarzystwo Ludoznawcze.
- Ogrodowska, Barbara (1996). Święta polskie: tradycja i obyczaj (in Polish). Alfa. ISBN 837001948X.
- Ogrodowska, Barbara (2000). Zwyczaje, obrzędy i tradycje w Polsce (in Polish). Verbinum. ISBN 8371921098.
- Uniwersytet Jagielloński (1985). "Prace etnograficzne". Zeszyty naukowe Uniwersytetu Jagiellońskiego (in Polish). 20 (1 ed.). Kraków: Państwowe Wydawnictwo Naukowe. ISSN 0083-4327.
- Usachova, Valeriya Vasil'yevna (2008). Магия слова и действия в народной культуре славян (in Russian). Moscow: Institute for Slavic Studies of the Russian Academy of Sciences. ISBN 978-5-7576-0221-9.
- Usachova, Valeriya Vasil'yevna (2009). Tolstoy, Nikita Ilyich (ed.). Славянские древности: Этнолингвистический словарь (in Russian). Vol. 4. П (Переправа через воду) – С (Сито). Moscow: Международные отношения. ISBN 978-5-7133-0703-5.
