= Polaznik =

Form of tradition

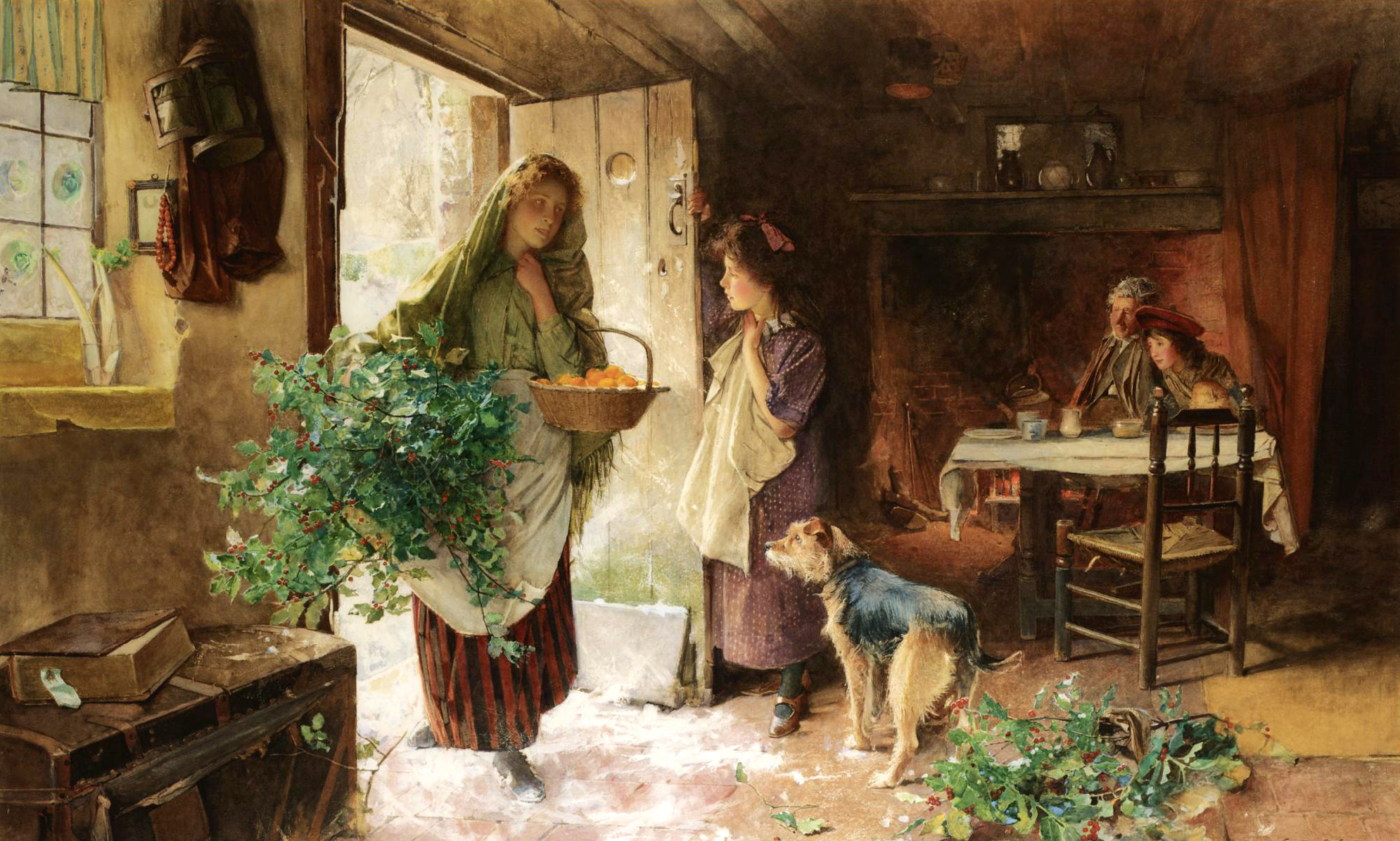
Carlton Alfred Smith, Christmas Eve

In Slavic traditions, a Polaznik (Note: Polish: podłaźnik, połaźnik, podłaźniczek Ukrainian: полазник, polaznik Slovak: polažeň, polaznik Slovene: polažar, polažič Serbian: полажајник, polažajnik, полаженик, polaženik, походник, pohodnik Bulgarian: (с)полезник, (s)poleznik, полазник, polaznik, по(х)ожняк, po(ch)ożnjak, походняк, pochodnjak, полазница, polaznica.) is the first guest (sometimes called the "divine guest") who comes to a house at Christmas or on some holiday between St. Demetrius day and Epiphany to bring luck, prosperity, health, and wealth for the coming year. Less frequently, the role of the polaznik is taken over by an animal, which is brought into the house, which is also supposed to bring luck. The ritual is known mainly to Ukrainians, Poles, Slovaks, Slovenes, Serbs, Croats, and Bulgarians. It is believed that the polaznik is a messenger of the ancestors, which connects the world of the living and the dead.

== Regional customs ==
=== Poland ===
In Poland, polaznik visited homes and gave residents green twigs decorated with colored paper cutouts (wycinanki), called podłaźniczka. Podlaznik also wished the residents well. This bypass custom was called połazy or podłazy. In Cieszyn Silesia second day of holidays is called podłazy. In southern Poland polaznik used to come on St. Stephen's Day. Priests often forbade podłazy during Christmas. Men who came to visit relatives and neighbors sprinkled oats on the house and all those present.

=== Slovakia ===
In Slovakia, the visit of a polaznik in the home is a form of koledari. The arrival of young, healthy children with green fir branches means that the person who sent them on St. Thomas' Day (December 21) wishes the household members to be happy, healthy, and young as children. At the same time, the elderly and sick polazniki were feared, as it was supposed to herald death and illness. In Slovak villages, it was forbidden for women to be polaznik because it was believed to bring bad luck. In central Slovakia, the polaznik came to the house with a green branch, which he stuck behind the ceiling beam to make the bread and flax grow as high as possible. The first guest who entered the house on Christmas Day was given bread so that the cattle could graze well in the summer. In the Zvolen region, also winemakers were polazniki.

The shepherd could also be a polaznik who came on the first day of the New Year with two branches – spruce and birch. Then he flogged the household members with the branches, which was supposed to bring them health. The homeowners kept these twigs until spring, until they first drove their cattle to pasture.

==== Moravian Slovakia ====
In the Moravian Slovakia region of the Czech Republic, the most coveted polaznik was a boy or a small animal. Wishes were made in the form of poems (polazné vinše). It was believed that a substitute must come to the house from the opposite direction in which the river flows (from the bottom to the top, against the current), otherwise the household members would "fly down like water". It was believed that the appearance of a boy-polaznik foretold the birth of a bull, and a girl-polaznik foretold the birth of a heifer. The polaznik was given specially baked bread in the shape of a cow, duck, or bird.

=== Lemkos ===
Lemkos used to call the host the polaznik, who, returning from the river, brought home a sheaf of oat straw (didok) and a bundle of hay and put them in the corner of the house; to the hostess's question, "Where are you from, Polaznik?", he replied: "From the cheerful, from the bright, from the good and from the happy."

=== Serbia ===
In Serbia, the polaznik was not chosen, but was the first person to cross the threshold of the house on Christmas Day. The polaznik and the host exchanged greetings, and then the polaznik was planted by the hearth. He would move a log (badnjak) in the hearth to bring good luck to the house (in the Šumadija area), then hit the coals with the twigs he brought with him, and at the same time he would pray with the family – he wishes the household as many sheep, money, family, and livestock as the sparks caused by the twigs. The hosts put a white, woolen rug on the polaznik, then he was supposed to sit on the stool, but at the last moment the hostess took the stool and the substrate fell to the floor. This was to kill all the birds of prey or, according to other versions, make the house fortunate. Sometimes a shoe was hung on the pole from the right foot of the polaznik, which was supposed to make the hemp grow high.

=== Bulgaria ===
In western Bulgaria, families often had their own, traditional polaznik, who was invited year after year at Christmas to prevent misfortune. The polaznik should be a person of good character, polite, wealthy, healthy, etc.; these qualities were passed on to household members. The polaznik should not be blind, deaf, sick, hunchbacked, with mutilations, dwarf, a child born out of wedlock. A polaznik should not come empty-handed or with an empty vessel, but should wear a fur coat so that no one would get sick or die. The guest would also take branches or straw from the yard, spread them by the fire in the house, then sit on them and pretend to be a hen, which was supposed to make the hens diligently lay eggs and keep the chicks safe. In the Rhodope Mountains, the fire stoker stoked the fire so that chicks and babies would be born quickly and easily, like sparks in a hearth.

In northern Bulgaria, the polaznik would light the fire in the bonfire with a branch of an oak, pear or plum tree and make a wish for all the people, according to which the people were to have as many chickens, goats, lambs, calves, foals, babies, honey, oil and wheat as sparks. The hostess sprinkled the polaznik with wheat, beans, nuts and dried fruit, which was supposed to induce fertility. Male polazniki were preferred, but they could also be women and children; the arrival of the male polaznik foreshadowed the male offspring and animals, and the arrival of the female polaznik foreshadowed the female offspring. In some places women were preferred – their arrival predicted the growth of cattle and poultry. Sometimes a family member was the first to leave the house and bring straw. Sometimes the hardest-working member of the family would also be a polaznik, and on St. Ignatius' Day (December 20) he would light a fire in the hearth and bring a green branch (southwestern Bulgaria).

=== Slovenia ===
In Slovenia, children were the polazniki. They would bring home a log and kneel on it to make rhyming wishes. They were given gifts to ensure the happiness of their household. In Styria, after receiving the bread, the polaznik would give a piece of bread to his household to ward off bad luck. Often they also agreed with a neighbor, who would warn against an unwanted guest. In Lendava, the polaznik wished girls a husband (k moži, к moži) and boys a wife (k ženi, k ženi). In some parts of Styria, the polaznik was obliged to come early on St. Lucy's Day (December 13), when everyone was still asleep, and give fodder to the cattle, for which he received bread (lucijžčak).

== Hosting the podlaznik ==
In the case of South Slavs, the polaznik received a treat, baked bread, some flax, a shirt, a towel, socks or wool and some coins. In the case of West Slavs and Ukrainians, the gifts were more modest. In the case of the Croats, the polaznik, when given a meal, had to eat greedily to bring prosperity into the home. In some places in Serbia, the polaznik was not honored until a year later, after making sure he was happy.

== The animal as a polaznik ==
In some areas, an animal was considered especially good for the role of a polaznik: ox, horse, cow, pig, sheep, rooster; sometimes a young animal – a calf or lamb – was preferred. The animal was brought into the house during one of the winter holidays, circled the table three times, and was given a treat. In Slovakia, a sheep was considered to be the best polaznik and was believed to "bring great luck" (prináša veľké śťástie). In Slovenia (Bela krajina), the rooster is the holiday guest, brought into the house and circled around the table. In Serbia, the ox is given a loaf (bread with a hole in it) or a harvest wreath by putting presents on its horn. In Bulgaria, a piglet was brought home: as the piglet kicks the ground with its snout forward, so everything in the house "will go forward" (shte vyrvi napred; Kyustendil, Radomir).

== Decoration ==
A Christmas decoration with a similar name is also associated with the tradition of the polaznik. In Poland, the most popular name for this decoration is podłaźniczka. It is the top of a coniferous tree, a branch or a riddle with green twigs hung from the ceiling directly over the table, or in a sacred corner as an ornament during Christmas, where the green tree referred to the pagan symbolism of life. In addition, so-called pająk "spiders" made of straw and other decorations were also hung.

The decoration could also be made of straw, rushlight, and reeds, which was a complicated hexagonal or quadrilateral construction, tied together with strings and decorated with paper chains, colored paper, colorful feathers, and clouds. Slovaks in Upper Spiš had a straw hen (polazňička) pinned above the Christmas table.

== Bread ==
In eastern Slovakia, polaznik is a ritual Christmas bread baked the old-fashioned way – from coarse flour, without yeast, in a simple form, without decorations. Carpathian Ukrainians have polaznik – ceremonial bread, girded with linen. It was given as a gift to the person who came as a polaznik during one of the winter holidays. This is also the name of a dish left at the Christmas table for the souls of deceased ancestors.

== See also ==
- First-foot
- House blessing
- Wassailing
- Jasličkári
- Koliada
- Julebukking

== Bibliography ==
- Usachova, Valeriya Vasil'yevna (2009). Tolstoy, Nikita Ilyich (ed.). Славянские древности: Этнолингвистический словарь (in Russian). Vol. 4. П (Переправа через воду) – С (Сито). Moscow: Международные отношения. ISBN 978-5-7133-0703-5.
- Jadwiga Wronicz, ed. (2010). Słownik gwarowy Śląska Cieszyńskiego (in Polish). Ustroń: Galeria „Na Grojach”. ISBN 9788360551288.
- Waligóra, Edward (1966). "Stroje i ubiory ludowe, lecznictwo ludowe, kamieniarstwo". Rocznik Muzeum Etnograficznego W Krakowie (in Polish). 1. Kraków: Wydawnictwo Literackie. ISSN 0454-482X.
- Janota, Eugeniusz (1878). Lud i jego zwyczaje: zwyczaje świąteczne (in Polish). Lviv: self-published.
