= First-foot =

British and Manx New Year's ritual

In Scottish, Northern English, and Manx folklore, the first-foot (Scottish Gaelic: ciad-chuairt, Manx: quaaltagh/qualtagh) is the first person to enter the home of a household on New Year's Day and is seen as a bringer of good fortune for the coming year. Similar practices are also found in Greek, Vietnamese, and Georgian new year traditions.

== Origin ==
The origins of first-footing are uncertain, although there may be a connection to the Viking Invasion of the British Isles: "This may go back to the time of Vikings when the arrival of a blond stranger at your door would be the cause of fear and alarm."

Many customs of first-footing (bringing coal, knocking on doors, group singing Auld Lang Syne to pass from the old to the new) parallel those of Samhain, the Celtic celebration marking the end of the harvest season, in which people recited verses door-to-door in exchange for food, and lit ritual bonfires.

"Quite a degree of transferability of customs across the period between Samhain ... Christmas and New Year. Whether this represents a natural tendency to transfer celebrations that brighten the dull winter months or a concerted religious effort to dissipate or transform wholly pagan festivities remains unclear, but a combination of factors is likely."

== Britain ==
=== North of England ===
The tradition of first-footing varies from place to place in the North of England. Generally, a tall, dark-haired male is preferred over a light-haired man or a woman. There are regional variations about the hair colour of the first-foot, although generally they must be male. In East Yorkshire, the first-footer should be dark-haired, but according to the North York Moors first-footers should be fair-haired.

Often it is expected that they will bring symbolic gifts, and be given food and drink in return by the inhabitants of the house they visit:

The first-foot doesn’t enter the house empty-handed—any first-footers who do arrive empty-handed will bring bad luck with them. Instead, the first-foot should bring a selection of gifts for the household, which can include; a silver coin; shortbread or a black bun; salt; coal; and a drink, usually whisky. They represent prosperity, food, flavour, warmth for the house, and good cheer – the whisky is used to toast the new year.

=== Scotland ===
The practice of first-footing is still common across Scotland and varies from place to place as part of Hogmanay celebrations. The luck that the first-foot brings with him will determine the luck for the household for the rest of the year.

Generally, the first-foot should be a tall, dark-haired male who is not already in the house when midnight strikes. In many areas, the first-foot should bring with him symbolic gifts such as coal, coins, whisky, or black buns. Food and drink will be given to the first-foot and any other guests. Often women and light- or red-haired men are considered very unlucky. In Scotland, first-footing has traditionally been more elaborate than in England, involving subsequent entertainment.

== Isle of Man ==
On the Isle of Man the practice of first-footing has also been a long-held tradition. A. W. Moore in his book Folklore of the Isle of Man described the practice:

The qualtagh (he or she) may also be the first person who enters a house on New Year's morning. In this case it is usual to place before him or her the best fare the family can afford. It was considered fortunate if the qualtagh were a person (a man being preferred to a woman), of dark complexion, as meeting a person of light complexion at this time, especially if his or her hair is red, would be thought very unlucky.

Traditionally, young boys would visit the houses in their local area on New Year's Day. They would recite a poem in the Manx language at every house. Boys with dark hair were considered lucky for the household and they were given the best food and drink the inhabitants had to share.

The New Year Blessing in Manx

Ollick ghennal erriu as bleïn feer vie,
Seihll as slaynt da’n slane lught thie.
Bea as gennallys eu bio ry-cheilley,
Shee as graih eddyr mraane as deiney.
Cooid as cowryn, stock as stoyr.
Palçhey phuddase, as skaddan dy-liooar.
Arran as caashey, eeym as roayrt.
Baase, myr lugh, ayns uhllin ny soalt.
Cadley sauçhey tra vees shiu ny lhie,
As feeackle y jargan, nagh bee dy mie.

The New Year Blessing in English

A merry Christmas on ye, and a very good year,
Long life and health to the whole household.
Your life and mirth living together,
Peace and love between women and men.
Goods and wealth, stock and store,
Plenty potatoes and enough herring.
Bread and cheese, butter and beef,
Death, like a mouse, in the stackyard of the barn.
Sleeping safely when you lie,
and the flea’s tooth, may it not be well.

== Outside of the British Isles ==
In Serbian folklore, the polaznik, polažajnik, polaženik, or radovan, is the first person who visits the family on Christmas Day. Like the first-foot tradition, it is expected that the visit will ensure good luck and well-being for the household in the ensuing year. Often a man or boy is chosen in advance for the visit on Christmas morning.

There are practices similar to first-footing outside the British Isles. In a similar Greek tradition called pothariko, also called podariko (from the root pod-, or 'foot'), it is believed that the first person to enter the house on New Year's Eve brings either good or bad luck. Many households to this day keep this tradition and specially select who first enters the house. After the first-foot, the lady of the house serves the guests with Christmas treats or gives them an amount of money to ensure that good luck will come in the new year.

A similar tradition exists in the country of Georgia, where the person is called მეკვლე meḳvle (from კვალი ḳvali – 'footstep', 'footprint', 'trace'). In Mingrelian language, the person is called მაკუჩხური maḳučxuri (from კუჩხი ḳučxi – 'foot'); and in Svan language – მჷჭშხი məč̣šxi (from ჭიშხ č̣išx – 'foot').

== See also ==
- Polaznik, in Slavic traditions
- House blessing
- Wassailing
