= Allahabadi Christmas fruitcake =

Christmas cake from Indian cuisine

Allahabadi cake
- Type: fruit cake
- Place of origin: Allahabad, India
- Main ingredients: maida, eggs, sugar, marmalade, nuts

Allahabadi Christmas fruitcake (Nastaleeq: الہ آبادی کرسمس فروٹ کیک, Devanagari: इलाहाबादी क्रिसमस फ़्रूट केक) is a traditional Indian rum fruit cake originating and lending its name from the north Indian city of Allahabad. Allahabadi cake is a Christmas cake popularly prepared for consumption during Christmastide by the Christian population of India and Pakistan.

== Preparation ==
Allahabadi cake is made with maida, eggs, clarified butter, sugar, petha, marmalade, nuts, ginger and fennel as its main ingredients. Dry fruits and nuts are soaked in rum for enhanced flavour.
