= Smudging =

Native American and First Nations ceremony

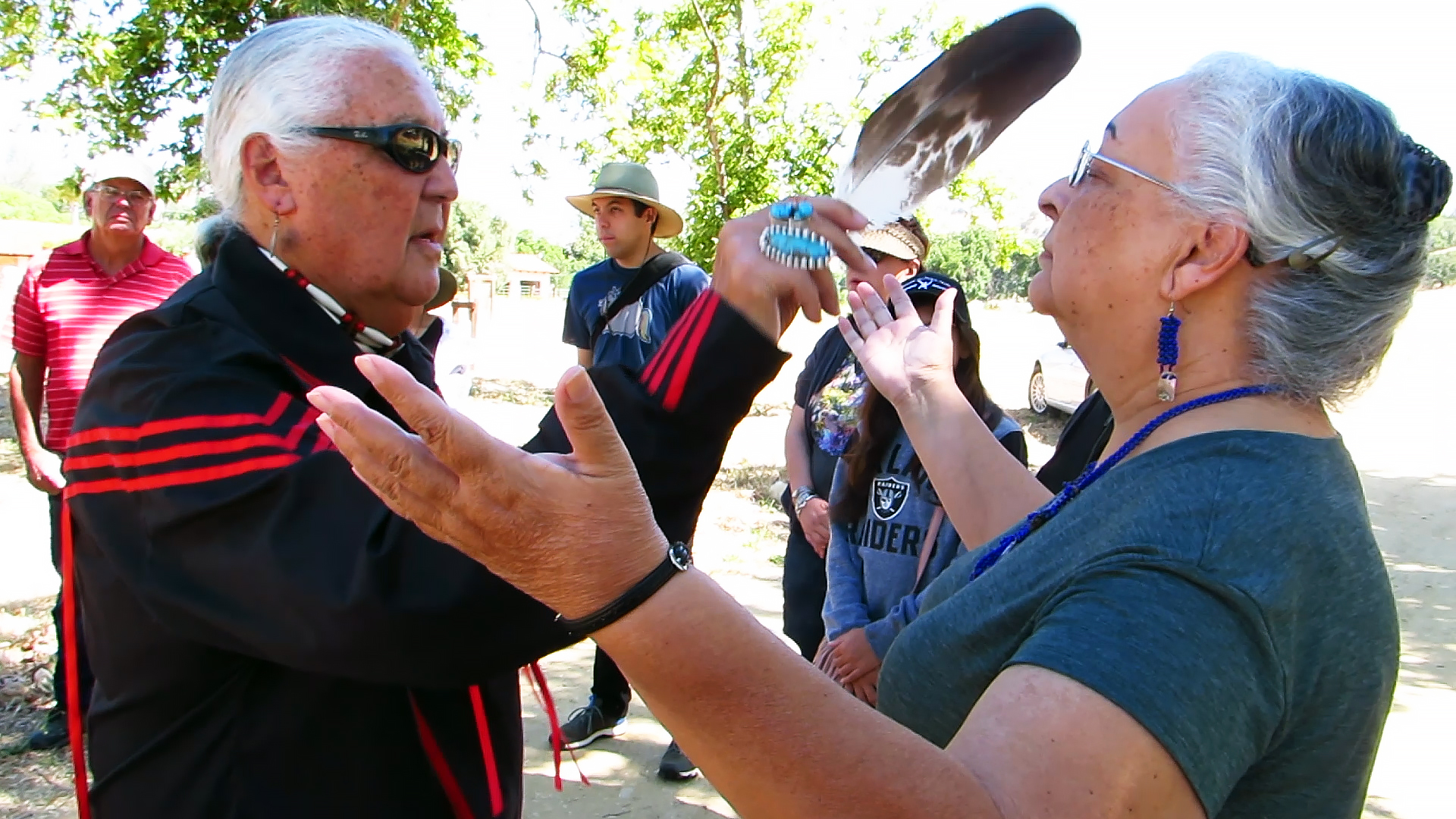
Members of the Xolon Salinan tribe participate in a smudging purification ceremony

Smudging, and other rites involving the burning of sacred herbs (e.g., white sage) or resins, are ceremonies practiced by some Indigenous peoples of the Americas. While they bear some resemblance to other suffumigation ceremonies and rituals involving smoke (e.g., Indigenous Australian smoking ceremony, some types of saining) from other world cultures, notably those that use smoke for spiritual cleansing or blessing, the purposes and particulars of the ceremonies, and the substances used, can vary widely among tribes, bands, and nations, and even more so among different world cultures. In traditional communities, elders maintain the protocols around these ceremonies and provide culture-specific guidance.

The smudging ceremony, by various names, has been used by people outside of Indigenous communities as part of New Age or commercial practices, which has also led to the over-harvesting of some of the plants used in ceremonies. Indigenous people in the US and Canada have argued against appropriation and against over-harvesting of white sage.

== Native American traditions ==
In some Indigenous American and Canadian ceremonies, certain herbs are traditionally used to purify or bless people and places. For instance, some cultures use the smoke of burning red cedar as part of their particular purification and healing ceremonies. Sometimes this is done in hospitals to "cleanse and repel evil influence." However, the same herbs that are burned by one culture may be taboo to burn in another, or they may be used for a completely different purpose. When specific herbs are burned ceremonially, this may or may not be called "smudging", depending on the culture. Traditionally, when gathering herbs for ceremonial use, care is taken to determine the time of day, month, or year when the herbs should be collected; For example, at dawn or evening, at certain phases of the moon, or according to yearly cycles. Gertrude Allen, a Lumbee, reported that her father, an expert in healing with plants, stated that sage varies in potency at different times of the year.

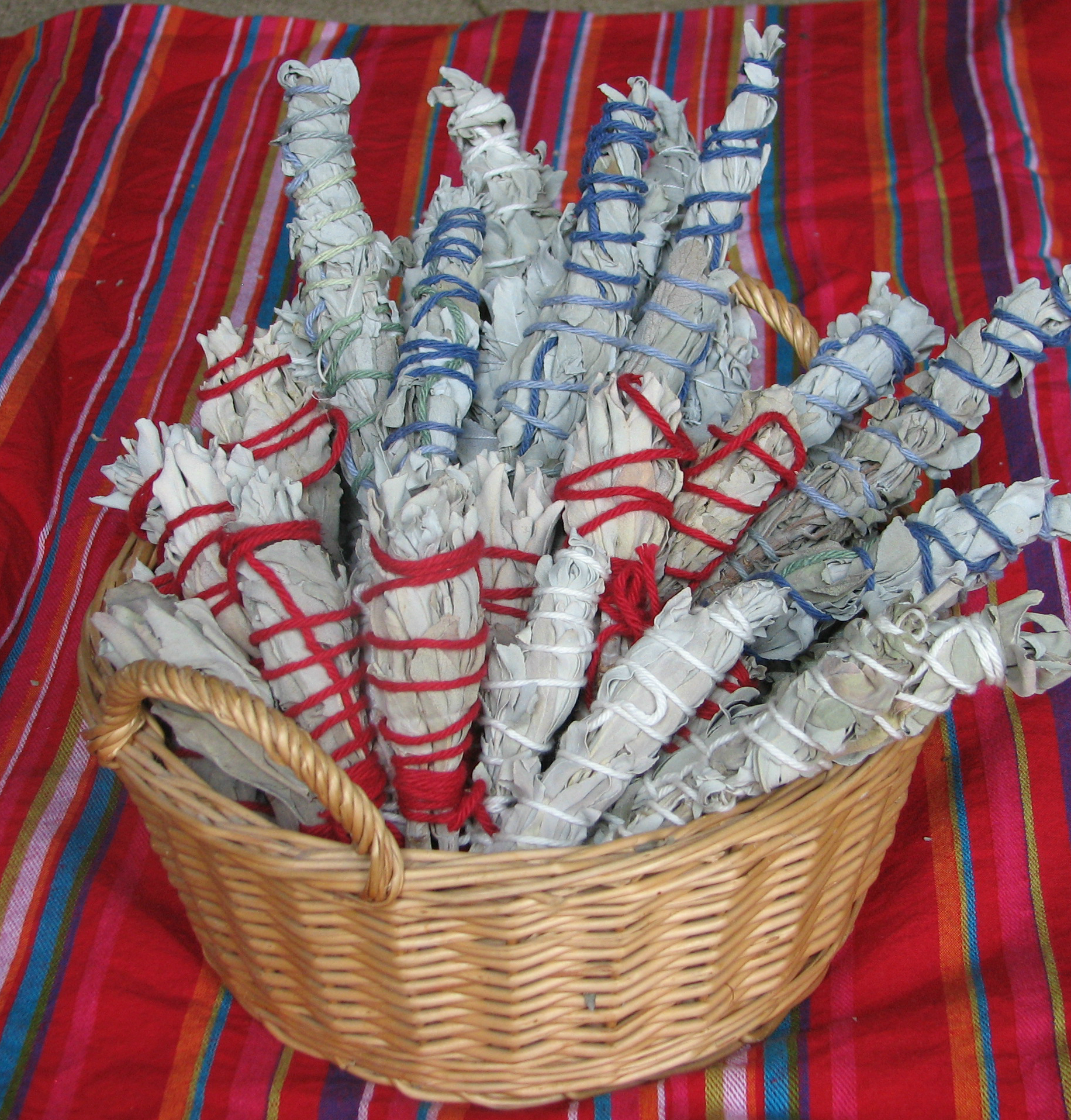
Bundled sage

While sage is commonly associated with smudging and several Native American, First Nations, Inuit or Métis cultures may use forms of sage that are local to their region, the use of sage is neither universal, nor as widespread as many believe. Its use in regions that have not traditionally used sage for purification is largely a result of the Pan-Indian movement, rather than traditional practice. In some cases it may be in direct opposition to what is traditional for that region. Likewise, not all Native American or Indigenous Canadian cultures that burn herbs or resins for ceremony call this practice "smudging".

While using various forms of scent and scented smoke (such as incense) in religious and spiritual rites is an element common to many different cultures worldwide, the details, reasons, desired effects, and spiritual meanings are usually unique to the specific cultures in question.

== Controversy ==
While the Californian white sage is not currently on the endangered list, over-harvesting by commercial sellers has severely depleted the amount available and raised concerns about future availability. Native ceremonial people have reported that visits to their traditional harvesting sites in recent years have found them bare, their personal supply of sage taken from the tribe forever by new age, hippie, and other commercial poachers who have destroyed the sites by ripping the plants up by their roots.

Some of the terminology in use among non-Indigenous people, such as the American English term "smudge stick" is usually found in use among those who imitate what they believe are Native American sacred ceremonies. However, the herbs used in commercial "smudge sticks" or "sage bundles," and the rituals performed with them by non-Natives, are rarely the actual materials or ceremonies used by traditional Native Americans. Use of these objects have also been adopted in some forms into a number of modern belief systems, including many forms of New Age and eclectic Neopagan spirituality. This has been protested against by Native activists as a form of cultural misappropriation, and care is needed to distinguish smudging from other practices involving smoke, which have completely different cultural protocols.

Smudging "kits" are often sold commercially, by companies such as Anthropologie, Sephora, World Market, and Walmart, despite traditional prohibitions against the sale of spiritual medicines like white sage. These may include bundles of a single herb or a combination of several different herbs; often these herbs are not found bundled together in traditional use, and their use is not universal to all, or even most, Native cultures. In some Native American cultures the burning of these herbs is prohibited. Other commercial items may contain herbs not native to North America, or not indigenous to the region where they are being used, as well as substances that are toxic when burned.

Native American and First Nations students in college dorms have at times faced harassment and been forbidden from burning herbs for ceremonial reasons due to university fire prevention policies that prohibit the burning of candles or incense in college dorm rooms. This has raised issues around the religious freedom of Native Americans. In another account, a Native American in Cincinnati became ordained by the Universal Life Church in order to fulfill the requirement that only clergy members could perform smudging ceremonies as part of the prayer ritual for other Native Americans in area hospitals.

== Use of smoke in other cultures ==
Other cultures worldwide may burn herbs or incense for spiritual purposes, such as in smoking ceremonies, some forms of saining, or practices involving the use of incense censers. However, these cultures have their own practices, as well as their own beliefs about these ritual actions and the ritual use of smoke.

== See also ==
- Moxibustion
- Plastic shaman
