= Jasličkári =

Slovak Catholic Christmas tradition

- Official name: Jasličkári
- Also called: The Infant
- Observed by: Catholic communities of Slovakia
- Frequency: Annual

Jasličkári, jaslickare (English: 'The Infant') or betlehemci (English: 'The Bethlehemers') is a Christmas tradition within the Catholic communities of Slovakia where a troupe of young men visit the homes of their neighbors and perform recitations and songs to commemorate the story of the birth of Jesus Christ. The performers are dressed in costumes said to represent shepherds or angels and carry staffs and a creche. They often accompany Christmas carolers.

== See also ==
- Koledari
- Wassailing
- Polaznik
- List of Christmas carols
