= Black bun =

Type of fruit cake

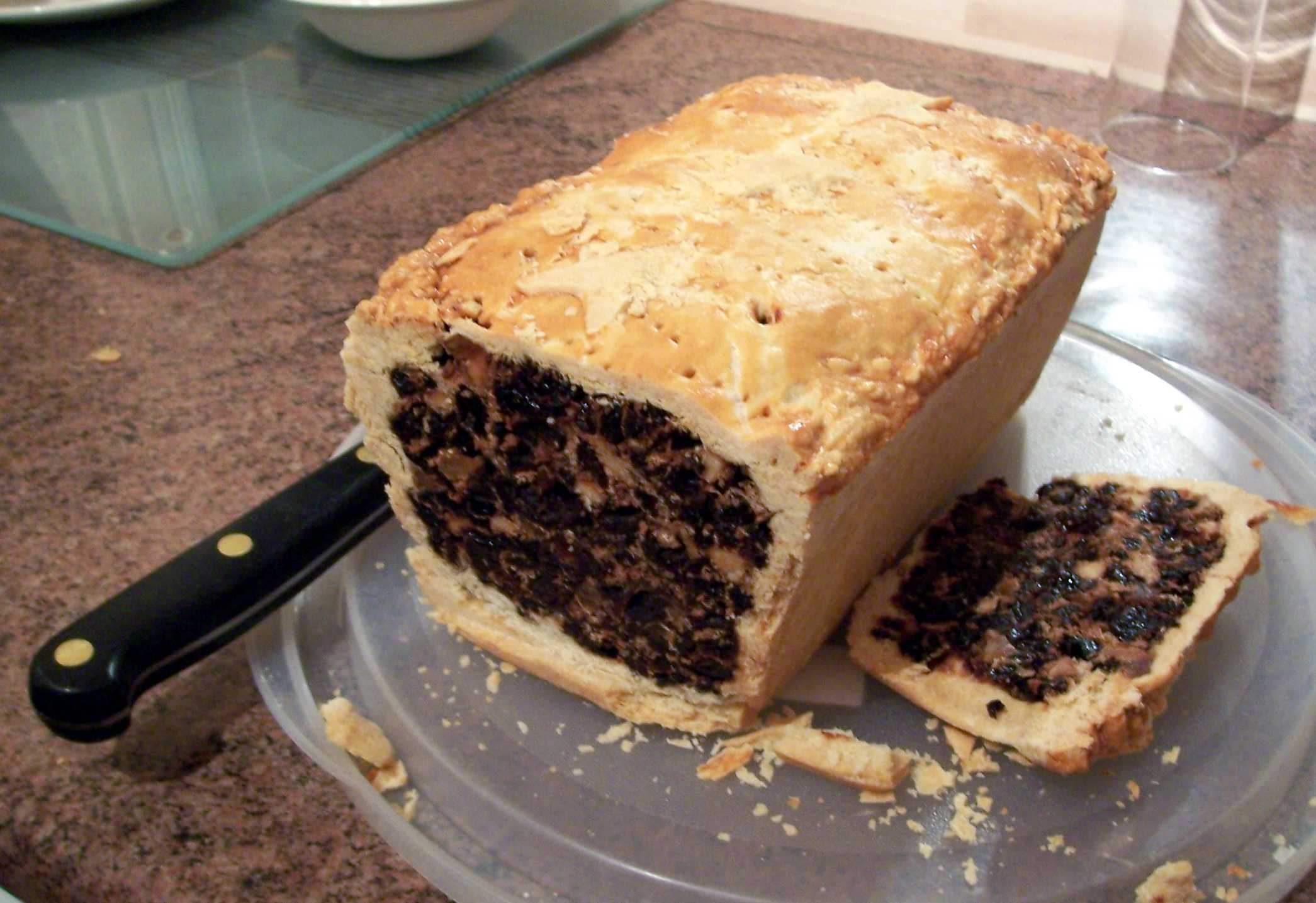
- A black bun cut open, showing fruit cake interior
- Alternative names: Scotch bun, Scotch Christmas bun
- Type: Fruit cake
- Place of origin: Scotland
- Main ingredients: Pastry, raisins, currants, almonds, citrus peel, allspice, ginger, cinnamon and pepper

Black bun, sometimes known as Scotch bun, is a type of fruit cake completely covered with pastry. It is Scottish in origin, originally eaten on the Twelfth Night of Christmas, and now enjoyed at Hogmanay. The cake mixture typically contains raisins, currants, almonds, citrus peel, allspice, ginger, cinnamon and black pepper. It had originally been introduced following the return of Mary, Queen of Scots from France, but its original use at Twelfth Night ended with the Scottish Reformation. It was subsequently used for first-footing over Hogmanay.

== Description ==
Black bun is a fruit cake wrapped in pastry. The cake itself is similar to a traditional Christmas cake or Christmas pudding mixture, including ingredients such as raisins and currants along with spices such as cinnamon, black pepper and allspice. It has been called a much bigger version of a Garibaldi biscuit, and it has been suggested that the latter's origin may have been influenced by the black bun because its inventor, John Carr, was Scottish.

Outside Scotland, the black bun is also eaten in the Appalachia region of the United States. In 2013, a recipe was demonstrated by Paul Hollywood on a Christmas special of The Great British Bake Off. It was then set as the signature challenge in the 2025 Hogmanay Special.

== Origins ==
The cake originated as a Scottish King cake for use on Twelfth Night on 5 January – the eve of Epiphany, and the end of the Twelve Days of Christmas. It was introduced following the return of Mary, Queen of Scots from France, and the tradition was that a bean was hidden in the cake – whoever found it became the King for the evening. It has been recorded that Mary herself participated in such games, and in 1563 she dressed her childhood companion Mary Fleming in royal robes and jewellery after Fleming became Queen for the evening. This stunned the English Ambassador, who wrote "The Queen of the Bean was that day in a gown of cloth of silver, her head, her neck, her shoulders, the rest of her whole body, so beset with stones, that more in our whole jewel house was not to be found." Following the Scottish Reformation in 1560, the celebration of Christmas was outlawed in Scotland and the related use of a King cake ended.

The black bun type of cake in its modern usage dates from the early nineteenth century. Previously called Scotch bun and Scotch Christmas bun, the term "black bun" was first recorded in 1898, and may have been a result of Robert Louis Stevenson referring to the cake as "a black substance inimical to life".

After the Scottish Reformation, winter festivities were moved to the New Year in Presbyterian Scotland, so the cake has been commonly incorporated into the New Year festivities after Hogmanay, where people traditionally visit their neighbours after midnight to celebrate the New Year. This is called first-foot, and the gift of a black bun was meant to symbolise that the receiving family would not go hungry during the forthcoming year. It was also used as a traditional cake to serve to those visiting homes as part of Hogmanay, to be consumed with whisky.

== See also ==
- List of pies, tarts and flans
