= Saining =

Scots word for blessing, protecting or consecrating

Saining is a Scots word for blessing, protecting, or consecrating. Sain is cognate with the Irish and Scottish Gaelic seun and sian and the Old Irish sén, 'a protective charm'.

== Practice ==
Traditional saining rites usually involve the use of water and smoke, accompanied by ritual gestures and spoken or sung poetry and prayers. Water that has been blessed in some fashion is sprinkled, or used for anointing. Fumigation is usually done with the smoke from large branches of burning juniper, either outdoors on a bonfire, or in a large vessel like a cauldron, resulting in massive amounts of smoke. While the ceremonial gestures can vary by spiritual or religious tradition, the prayers and poetry are usually traditional pieces in Gaelic. Saining a household with copious amounts of the smoke of burning juniper was traditionally used in healing rites, where the evil eye has been suspected to be the cause of the illness, but it apparently fell out of use by the end of the 19th century after a young girl with respiratory problems suffocated due to the amount of smoke that filled the house.

Saining can also refer to less formal customs like making religious signs to protect against evil, such as the sign of the cross. In Shetland, the Scottish folklorist F. Marian McNeil also refers to the custom of making the sign of Thor's hammer to sain the goblet that was passed around at New Year's celebrations.

Saining is a common practice in more modern traditions based on Scottish folklore, such as blessing and protecting children and other family members. While many of the surviving saining prayers and charms are Christian in nature, other traditional pieces that focus on the spirits and powers of nature are used as part of Gaelic polytheist ceremonies.

=== During Hogmanay ===
An old Hogmanay (New Year's) custom in the Highlands of Scotland, which has survived to a small extent and seen some degree of revival, is to celebrate Hogmanay with the saining of the household and livestock. Early on New Year's morning, householders drink and then sprinkle 'magic water' from 'a dead and living ford' around the house (a 'dead and living ford' refers to a river ford that is routinely crossed by both the living and the dead). After the sprinkling of the water in every room, on the beds and all the inhabitants, the house is sealed up tight and branches of juniper are set on fire and carried throughout the house and byre. The juniper smoke is allowed to thoroughly fumigate the buildings until it causes sneezing and coughing among the inhabitants. Then all the doors and windows are flung open to let in the cold, fresh air of the new year. The woman of the house then administers 'a restorative' from the whisky bottle, and the household sits down to its New Year breakfast.

== See also ==
- Apotropaic magic
- House blessing
- Incense
- Smudging
- Talisman
