= Hogmanay =

Scottish celebration of New Year

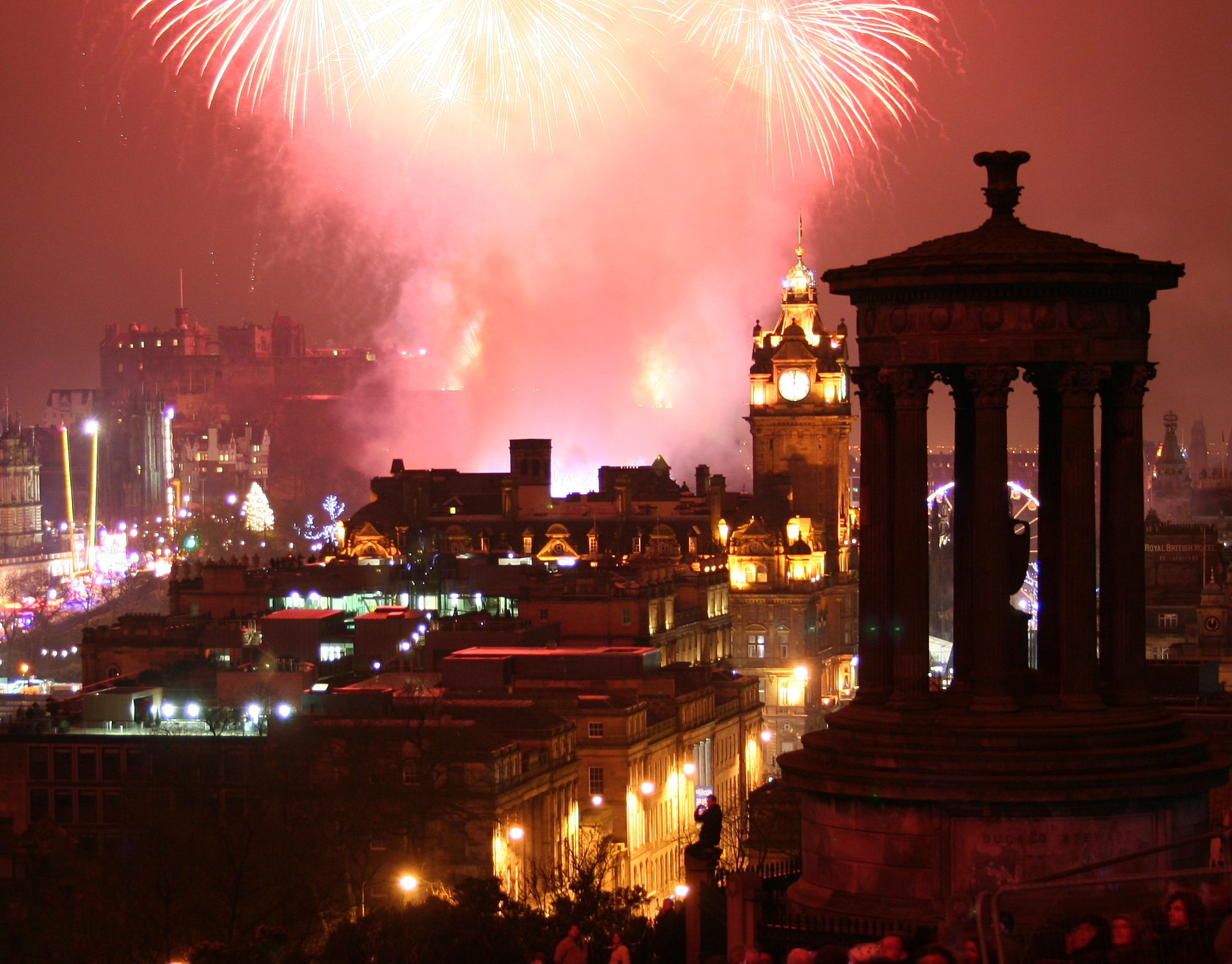
- Fireworks for Edinburgh's Hogmanay
- Official name: Hogmanay
- Also called: "Daft days"
- Observed by: Scots
- Type: National
- Significance: The final day of the Gregorian calendar year
- Celebrations: Reflection; late-night partying; family gatherings; feasting; gift exchanges; fireworks; countdowns; watchnight services; social gatherings, during which participants may dance, eat, consume alcoholic beverages, and watch or light fireworks
- Begins: 31 December
- Ends: 2 January
- Date: 31 December
- Frequency: Annual
- Related to: New Year's Eve

Hogmanay (/ˈhɒɡməneɪ, ˌhɒɡməˈneɪ/ HOG-mə-nay, -NAY, Scots: [ˌhɔɡməˈneː]) is the Scots word for the last day of the old year and the celebration of the New Year in the Scottish manner. It is normally followed by further celebration on the morning of New Year's Day (1 January) and, in some cases, 2 January—a Scottish bank holiday. In a few contexts, Hogmanay is used more loosely to describe the entire period consisting of the last few days of the old year and the first few days of the new year. For instance, not all events held under the banner of Edinburgh's Hogmanay take place on 31 December.

Customs vary throughout Scotland and usually include gift-giving and visiting the homes of friends and neighbours, with particular attention given to the first-foot, the first guest of the new year.

== Etymology ==
The etymology of the word is obscure. The earliest proposed etymology comes from the 1693 Scotch Presbyterian Eloquence, which held that the term was a corruption of a presumed Ancient Greek: ἁγία μήνη (hagíā mḗnē) and that this meant "holy month". (Note: μήνη actually means "moon") The three main modern theories derive it from a French, Norse or Gaelic root.

The word is first recorded in a Latin entry in 1443 in the West Riding of Yorkshire as hagnonayse. The first appearance in Scots language came in 1604 in the records of Elgin, as hagmonay. Subsequent 17th-century spellings include Hagmena (1677), Hogmynae night (1681), and Hagmane (1693) in an entry of the Scotch Presbyterian Eloquence.

Although Hogmanay is currently the predominant spelling and /ˈhɒɡməneɪ/ and /ˌhɒɡməˈneɪ/ the predominant pronunciations, several variant spellings and pronunciations have been recorded, including:

- Hoghmanay
- Hagman(a)e
- Hagmonay
- Hagmonick
- Hanginay (Roxburghshire)
- Hangmanay
- Hogernoany (Shetland)
- Hogminay
- Hogmenay
- Hogmynae
- Hoguemennay
- Huggeranohni (Shetland)
- Hu(i)gmanay

with the first syllable variously being /hɔg/, /hog/, /hʌg/, /hʌug/ or /haŋ/.

=== Possible French etymologies ===
The term may have been introduced to Middle Scots via French. The most commonly cited explanation is a derivation from the northern French dialectal word hoguinané, or variants such as hoginane, hoginono and hoguinettes, those being derived from 16th-century Middle French aguillanneuf meaning either a gift given at New Year, a children's cry for such a gift, or New Year's Eve itself. The Oxford English Dictionary reports this theory, saying that the term is a borrowing of aguillanneuf, a medieval French cry used to welcome the new year; this word consists of an unknown first element plus "l'an neuf" ("the new year").

This explanation is supported by a children's tradition, observed up to the 1960s in parts of Scotland at least, of visiting houses in their locality on New Year's Eve and requesting and receiving small treats such as sweets or fruit. The second element would appear to be l'an neuf ("the New Year"). Compare those to Norman hoguinané and the obsolete customs in Jersey of crying ma hodgîngnole, and in Guernsey of asking for an oguinane, for a New Year gift (see also La Guiannee). In Québec, la guignolée was a door-to-door collection for people experiencing poverty.

Compare also the apparent Spanish cognate aguinaldo/aguilando, with a suggested Latin derivation of hoc in anno "in this year".

Other suggestions include au gui mener ("lead to the mistletoe"), à gueux mener ('bring to the beggars'), au gui l'an neuf ('at the mistletoe the new year', or (l')homme est né ('(the) man is born').

=== Possible Goidelic etymologies ===
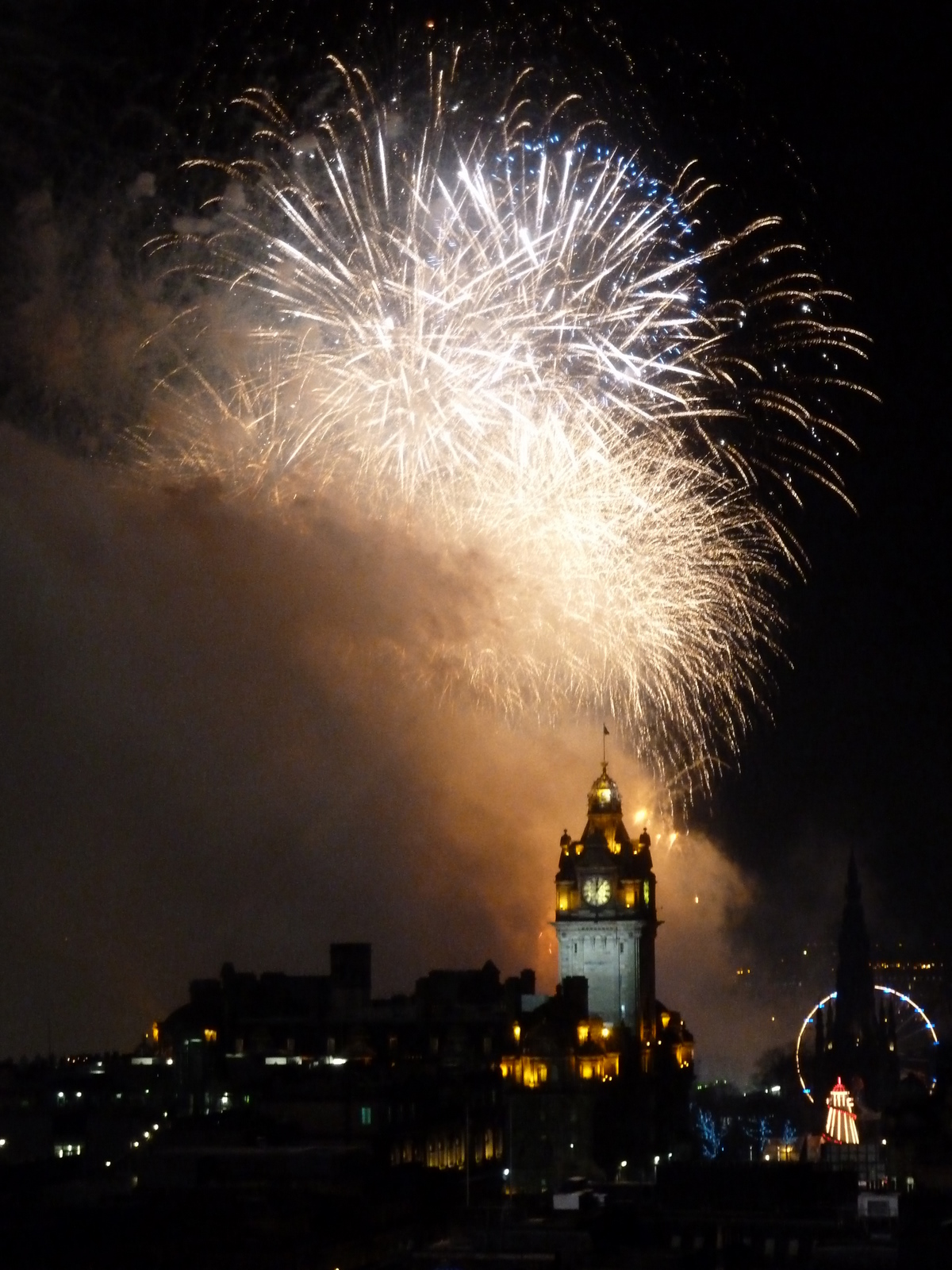
Fireworks in Scotland's capital city, Edinburgh, as part of the 2011 Hogmanay celebrations

The word may have come from the Goidelic languages. Frazer and Kelley report a Manx new-year song that begins with the line To-night is New Year's Night, Hogunnaa but did not record the full text in Manx. Kelley himself uses the spelling Og-u-naa... Tro-la-la whereas other sources parse this as hog-un-naa and give the modern Manx form as Hob dy naa. Manx dictionaries though give Hop-tu-Naa (Manx pronunciation: [hopʰ tθu neː]), generally glossing it as "Hallowe'en", same as many of the more Manx-specific folklore collections.

In this context, it is also recorded that in the south of Scotland (for example Roxburghshire), there is no ⟨m⟩, the word thus being Hunganay, which could suggest the ⟨m⟩ is intrusive.

Another theory occasionally encountered is a derivation from the phrase thog mi an èigh/eugh ([hok mi ˈɲeː], "I raised the cry"), which resembles Hogmanay in pronunciation and was part of the rhymes traditionally recited at New Year but it is unclear if this is simply a case of folk etymology.

Overall, Gaelic consistently refers to the New Year's Eve as Oidhche na Bliadhn(a) Ùir(e) ("the Night of the New Year") and Oidhche Challainn ("the Night of the Calends").

=== Possible Norse etymologies ===
Other authors reject both the French and Goidelic theories and instead suggest that the ultimate source for this word's Norman French, Scots, and Goidelic variants have a common Norse root. It is suggested that the full forms

- "Hoginanaye-Trollalay/Hogman aye, Troll a lay" (with a Manx cognate Hop-tu-Naa, Trolla-laa)
- "Hogmanay, Trollolay, give us of your white bread and none of your gray"

invoke the hill-men (Icelandic haugmenn, compare Anglo-Saxon hoghmen) or "elves" and banishes the trolls into the sea (Norse á læ 'into the sea'). Repp furthermore links "Trollalay/Trolla-laa" and the rhyme recorded in Percy's Relics: "Trolle on away, trolle on awaye. Synge heave and howe rombelowe trolle on away", which he reads as a straightforward invocation of troll-banning.

=== Possible Scots etymology ===
In 1865 correspondence, the question was raised whether the word Hogmanay derived from hogman (or hugman), a type of inferior bread, regarded as "strangers' bread" or "alms bread". This connection is rooted in much older history; hogman was first recorded in circa 1320 as the lowest of three distinct grades of loaves donated by Robert the Bruce to the canons of Restenneth Priory, as written in the Register of the Great Seal of Scotland.

This connection was further clarified in 1888 correspondence, where a contributor named 'A Fifer' noted that in Fife, the day was not known as Hogmanay but was instead called Cake-day. This name referred to the cakes (Scots for fancy bread or currant loaf) traditionally distributed when children and the poor went door-to-door. Likewise, the author suggested that in other parts of Scotland, the name evolved from Hogman-day, eventually softened to Hogmanay, referring to the hogman given out in the same way.

More recently, in 1992, it was noted how the traditional rhyme - 'Gi'e us a piece o your white bread, And eke a bittoc o' your grey, Wi' brown laif dawds for Hogmanay' - directly reflected this same historic record of three different grades of loaves, with the least desirable left for Hogmanay.

== Origins ==
It is speculated that the roots of Hogmanay may reach back to the celebration of the winter solstice among the Norse, as well as incorporating customs from the Gaelic celebration of Samhain. The Norse celebrated Yule, which later contributed to the Twelve Days of Christmas, or the "Daft Days" as they were sometimes called in Scotland. Christmas was not celebrated as a festival, and Hogmanay was the more traditional celebration in Scotland. This may have been a result of the Protestant Reformation after which Christmas was seen as "too Papist".

Hogmanay was also celebrated in the north of England, down to and including Richmond in North Yorkshire. It was traditionally known as 'Hagmena' in Northumberland, 'Hogmina' in Cumberland, and 'Hagman-ha' or 'Hagman-heigh' in the North Riding of Yorkshire.

== Customs ==
There are many customs, both national and local, associated with Hogmanay. The most widespread national custom is the practice of first-footing, which starts immediately after midnight. This involves being the first person to cross the threshold of a friend or neighbour and often involves the giving of symbolic gifts such as salt (less common today), coal, shortbread, whisky, and black bun (a rich fruit cake), intended to bring different kinds of luck to the householder. Food and drink (as the gifts) are then given to the guests. This may go on throughout the early morning hours and into the next day (although modern days see people visiting houses well into the middle of January). The first-foot is supposed to set the luck for the rest of the year. Traditionally, tall, dark-haired men are preferred as the first-foot.

=== Local customs ===
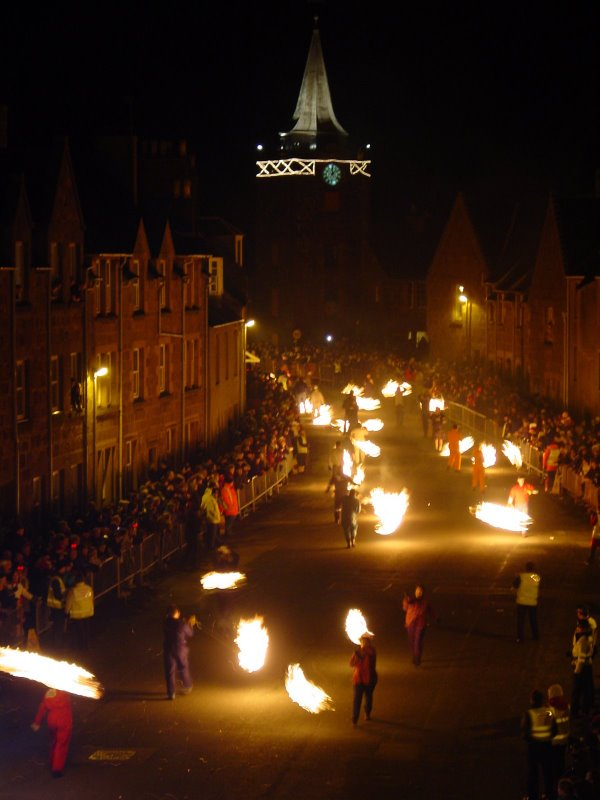
Stonehaven Fireballs Ceremony 2003

An example of a local Hogmanay custom is the fireball swinging that takes place in Stonehaven, Aberdeenshire, in northeast Scotland. This involves local people making up "balls" of chicken wire filled with old newspaper, sticks, rags, and other dry flammable material up to a diameter of 2 feet (0.61 m), each attached to about 3 feet (0.91 m) of wire, chain or nonflammable rope. As the Old Town House bell sounds to mark the new year, the balls are set alight, and the swingers set off up the High Street from the Mercat Cross to the Cannon and back, swinging the burning balls around their heads as they go.

At the end of the ceremony, fireballs still burning are cast into the harbour. Many people enjoy this display, and large crowds flock to see it, with 12,000 attending the 2007/2008 event. In recent years, additional attractions have been added to entertain the crowds as they wait for midnight, such as fire poi, a pipe band, street drumming, and a firework display after the last fireball is cast into the sea. The festivities are now streamed live over the Internet. Another example of a fire festival is the burning the clavie in the town of Burghead in Moray.

In the east coast fishing communities and Dundee, first-footers once carried a decorated herring. And in Falkland in Fife, local men marched in torchlight procession to the top of the Lomond Hills as midnight approached. Bakers in St Andrews baked special cakes for their Hogmanay celebration (known as "Cake Day") and distributed them to local children.

Institutions also had their own traditions. For example, amongst the Scottish regiments, officers waited on the men at special dinners while at the bells, the Old Year is piped out of barrack gates. The sentry then challenges the new escort outside the gates: "Who goes there?" The answer is "The New Year, all's well."

An old custom in the Highlands is to celebrate Hogmanay with the saining (Scots for 'protecting, blessing') of the household and livestock. Early on New Year's morning, householders drink and then sprinkle 'magic water' from 'a dead and living ford' around the house (a 'dead and living ford' refers to a river ford that is routinely crossed by both the living and the dead). After the sprinkling of the water in every room, on the beds and all the inhabitants, the house is sealed up tight and branches of juniper are set on fire and carried throughout the house and byre. The juniper smoke is allowed to thoroughly fumigate the buildings until it causes sneezing and coughing among the inhabitants. Then, all the doors and windows are flung open to let in the cold, fresh air of the new year. The woman of the house then administers 'a restorative' from the whisky bottle, and the household sits down to its New Year breakfast.

=== "Auld Lang Syne" ===
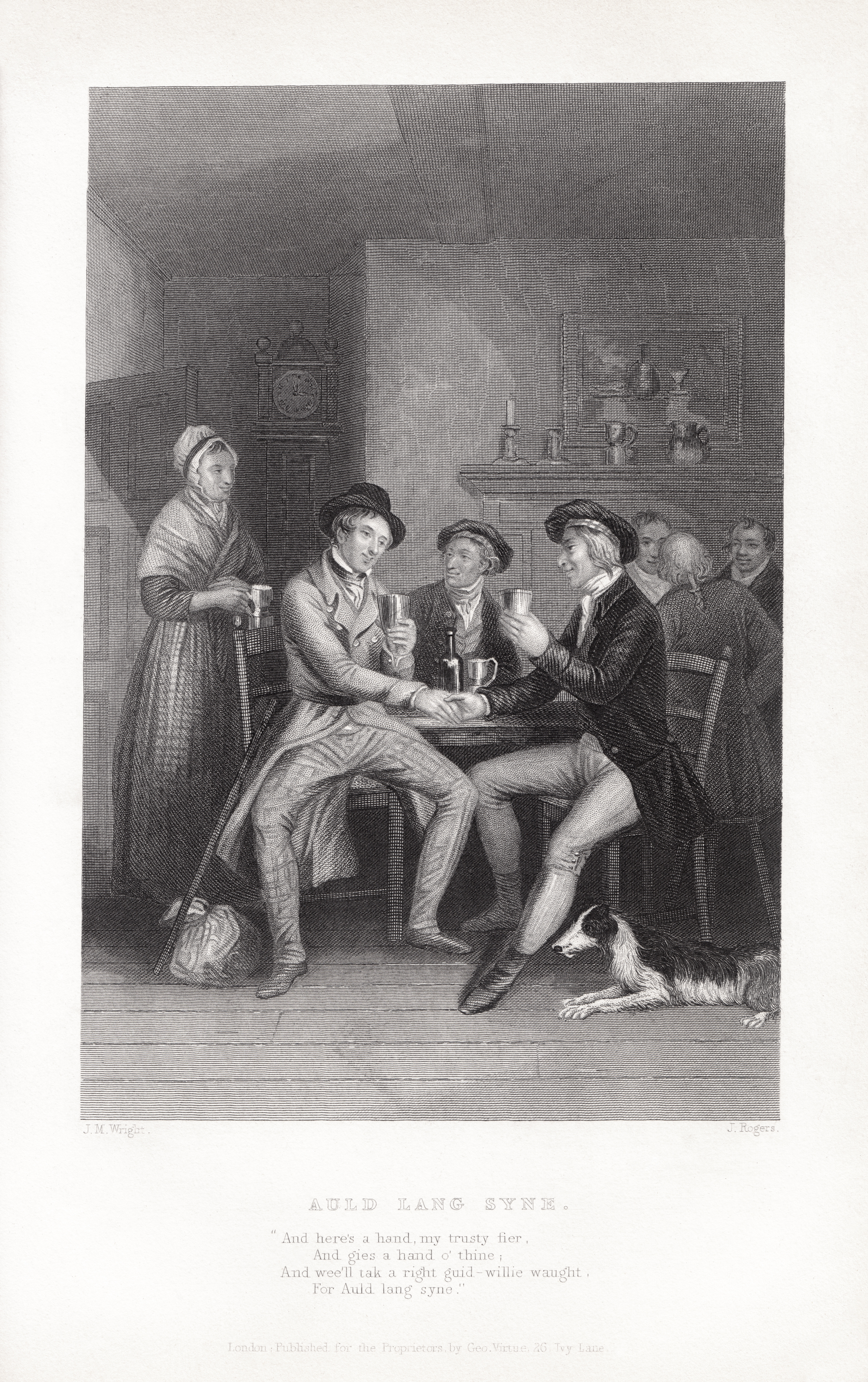
John Masey Wright and John Rogers' c. 1841 illustration of Auld Lang Syne.

The Hogmanay custom of singing "Auld Lang Syne" has become common in many countries. "Auld Lang Syne" is a Scots poem by Robert Burns, based on traditional and other earlier sources. It is common to sing this in a circle of linked arms crossed over one another as the clock strikes midnight for New Year's Day. However, it is only intended that participants link arms at the beginning of the final verse before rushing into the centre as a group.

== In the media ==
Between 1957 and 1968, a New Year's Eve television programme, The White Heather Club, was presented to herald the Hogmanay celebrations. The show was presented by Andy Stewart, who always began by singing, "Come in, come in, it's nice to see you...." The show always ended with Stewart and the cast singing, "Haste ye Back":

Haste ye back, we loue you dearly,
Call again you're welcome here.
May your days be free from sorrow,
And your friends be ever near.

May the paths o'er which you wander,
Be to you a joy each day.
Haste ye back we loue you dearly,
Haste ye back on friendship's way.

The performers were Jimmy Shand and band, Ian Powrie and his band, Scottish country dancers: Dixie Ingram and the Dixie Ingram Dancers, Joe Gordon Folk Four, James Urquhart, Ann & Laura Brand, Moira Anderson & Kenneth McKellar. All the male dancers and Andy Stewart wore kilts, and the female dancers wore long white dresses with tartan sashes. Following the demise of the White Heather Club, Andy Stewart continued to feature regularly in TV Hogmanay shows until his retirement. His last appearance was in 1992.

In the 1980s, comedian Andy Cameron presented the Hogmanay Show (on STV in 1983 and 1984 and from 1985 to 1990 on BBC Scotland) while Peter Morrison presented the show A Highland Hogmanay on STV/Grampian, axed in 1993. For many years, a staple of New Year's Eve television programming in Scotland was the comedy sketch show Scotch and Wry, featuring the comedian Rikki Fulton, which invariably included a hilarious monologue from him as the gloomy Reverend I.M. Jolly. Since 1991, the programmes that have been mainstays on BBC Scotland on Hogmanay have been BBC Scotland's Hogmanay and Jonathan Watson's football-themed sketch comedy show, Only an Excuse? (1993–2020). On STV, various Hogmanay celebration programmes have aired since 2006, most commonly Bringing in the Bells.

== Presbyterian influence ==
The 1693 Scotch Presbyterian Eloquence contained one of the first mentions of the holiday in official church records. Hogmanay was treated with general disapproval. Still, in Scotland, Hogmanay and New Year's Day are as important as Christmas Eve and Christmas Day.

Although Christmas Day held its normal religious nature in Scotland amongst its Catholic and Episcopalian communities, the Presbyterian national church, the Church of Scotland, discouraged the celebration of Christmas for nearly 400 years; it only became a public holiday in Scotland in 1958. Conversely, 1 and 2 January are public holidays, and Hogmanay is still associated with as much celebration as Christmas in Scotland.

== Major celebrations ==
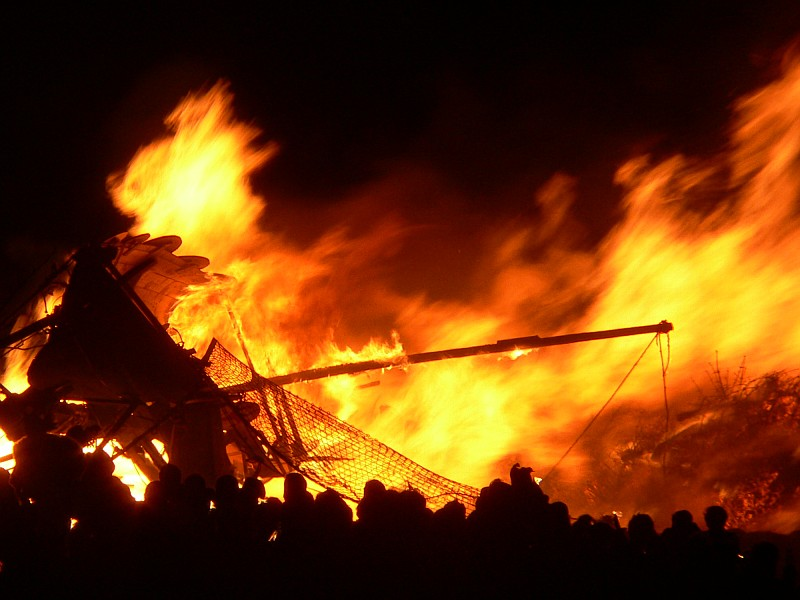
A Viking longship is burnt during Edinburgh's annual Hogmanay celebrations (though Edinburgh has no historical connection with those Norse who invaded Scotland).

As in much of the world, major Scottish cities including Glasgow, Edinburgh, Stirling, Inverness and Aberdeen hold all-night celebrations. The Edinburgh Hogmanay celebrations are among the largest in the world. Celebrations in Edinburgh in 1996–97 were recognised by the Guinness Book of Records as the world's largest New Years party, with approximately 400,000 people in attendance. Numbers were then restricted due to safety concerns.

In 2003-4, most organised events were cancelled at short notice due to very high winds. The Stonehaven Fireballs went ahead as planned, however, with 6,000 people braving the stormy weather to watch 42 fireball swingers process along the High Street. Similarly, the 2006–07 celebrations in Edinburgh, Glasgow, and Stirling were all cancelled on the day, again due to high winds and heavy rain. The Aberdeen celebration, however, went ahead and was opened by pop music group Wet Wet Wet.

Many Hogmanay festivities were cancelled in 2020–21 and 2021–22 due to the COVID-19 pandemic in Scotland. The Edinburgh event was also cancelled in 2024-25 due to high winds.

== Ne'erday ==
Some Scots celebrate New Year's Day with a special dinner, usually steak pie.

== Handsel Day ==
Historically, presents were given in Scotland on the first Monday of the New Year. A roast dinner would be eaten to celebrate the festival. Handsel was a word for gift and hence "Handsel Day". In modern Scotland, this practice has died out.

The period of festivities running from Christmas to Handsel Monday, including Hogmanay and Ne'erday, is known as the Daft Days.

== See also ==
- Christmas in Scotland
- Calennig, the last day of the year in Wales
- hǫkunátt
