= Straw mobile =

Traditional European Christmas decoration

A straw mobile is a mobile made from reeds, straw or other similar material bound together with string, often forming geometric shapes such as octahedrons, and can be decorated further with craft supplies such as wood, yarn, or feathers. Such mobiles have been traditional in Northern Europe, Eastern Europe, and some countries in Central Europe (such as Poland and Germany, Ukraine) where they may serve as symbolic or religious decorations. Modern variations can be made from materials like brass or plastic.

In 2023, the making of Lithuanian straw mobiles, sodas, has been inscribed on the UNESCO Intangible Cultural Heritage Lists.

== National variants ==
Different cultures have different names for straw mobiles. For example, in some Germanic cultures they are often known as himmeli (heavens), while in Slavic cultures they are known as pajak (spider).

Name	Culture	Photo	Notes
Саламяны павук, Павук	Belarus		
pająk, kierec	Poland		Pająki are often colourfully decorated and the minimal form can use straw-only.
Різдвяний павук	Ukraine		
sodas, liktorius, voras, žarondelis, šiaudinukai	Lithuania		Sodai translates to 'Gardens' in English, it can be translated as 'Chandeliers' as well.
Паук	Russia		
Himmeli, olkihimmeli	Finland		While himmelis are no longer standard in Finnish homes, some people have taken on the tradition and revitalised it.
jõulukroon, näärikroon, äll	Estonia		
puzuris, puzurs, lukturis, krīģis, spurgulis	Latvia		
Himmeli	Germany		
halmkrone, julekrone, julekrune	Norway		
Himmeli	Swedish		Himmeli' (from Swedish: himmel – "heaven" and "sky") The himmeli base shape consists of 12 fragments, which symbolize the 12 months. They are used as decorations from Christmas until Midsummer. Modern himmeli are also made of plywood, paper and even plastic straws. Their purpose is to ensure a good harvest in the following year, and it functions as a home for the crop spirit. It hangs from the ceiling over the dinner table. The larger the himmeli the larger the rye crop.

== Shape ==
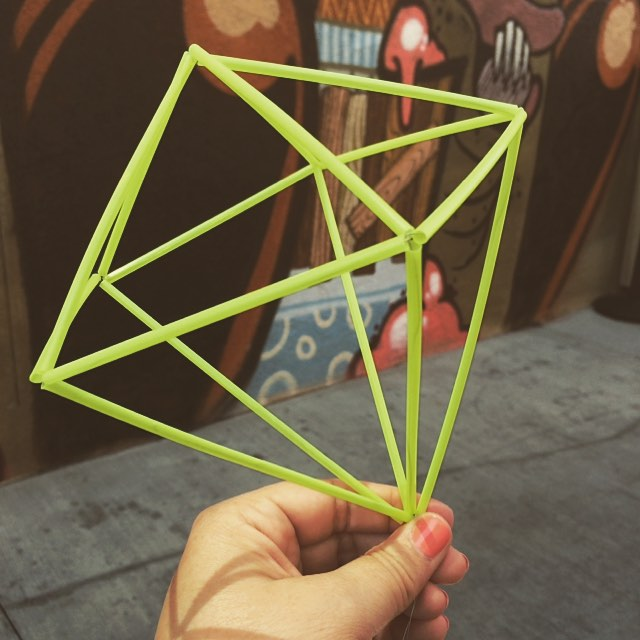
Plastic straw mobile

Straw mobiles are geometric structures, with the main diamond pattern thought to be reminiscent of the shape of the fields that farmers used. The patterns vary from simple to extremely complex, from a diamond to an octahedron.^{[7]} Regardless of the pattern, straw mobiless are symmetrical from their hanging points. Different patterns are created by the straw mobile as it rotates.

== Modern practice ==
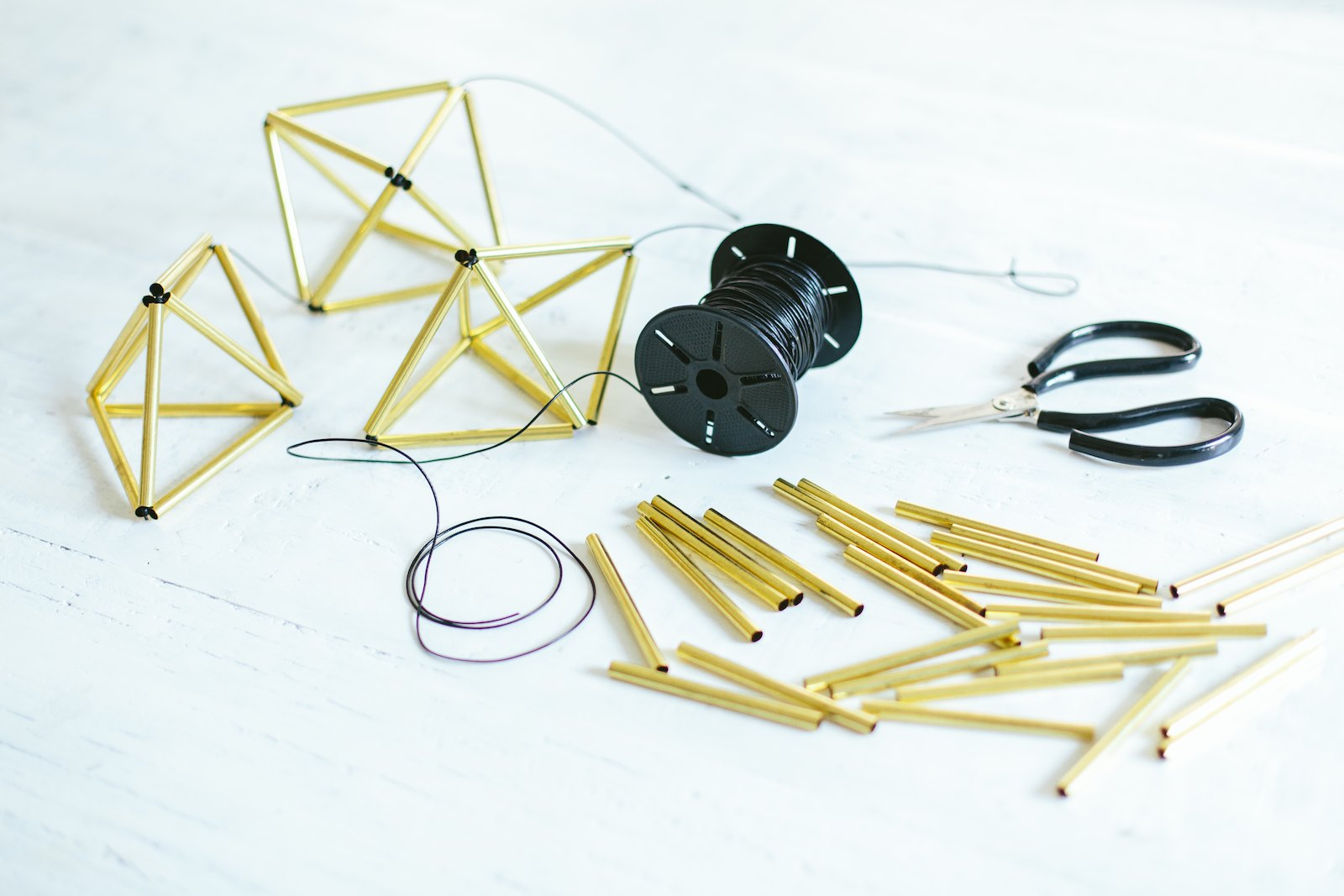
Modern brass straw mobiles and corresponding tools and parts from a do-it-yourself kit

In addition to increased popularity in their traditional form, straw mobiles have also experienced modern twists within the craft and décor community. Alternative materials such as straws and metal tubes have become common. Straw mobiles made out of metal tubes are sold as year-round décor as opposed to solely a Christmastime fixture. Sometimes they keep the same form as a mobile, but some retailers sell Straw mobiles designed to hold air plants or potted plants. Straw mobiles have even made it into high-end design. Designer Paul Loebach used himmelis as inspiration for a line of pendant lights and his designs have also been recreated by other companies. Another way that Straw mobiles have gained popularity is as a simple craft. While Straw mobiles can be extremely intricate and complex, smaller versions are relatively easy to make, resulting in many websites creating how-to articles and suggesting it as a kid’s craft. Some websites give a list of materials, while other retailers sell prefabricated kits with all the necessary supplies.

Straw mobiles have inspired other artworks that incorporate similar geometric patterns, such as a 5.2m sculpture made of aluminum and LED lights by artist Ray Bartkus.

== Process ==
The process of creating a straw mobile begins with the harvest. The best straw of the rye harvest is cut into sections about 2m long and laid out to dry. The rye changes from green to a golden brown and the process takes several weeks. Once dried, the rye is cut at the joints and separated into groups based on the thickness of the stalk. At this point the construction itself can begin. The straw is cut into sections of the desired length and thread is threaded through the hollow stems to join them together. The thread should be hidden within the straw and near invisible when viewing the Straw mobiles.
