= Tree-topper =

Decoration placed on top of a Christmas tree or Chrismon tree

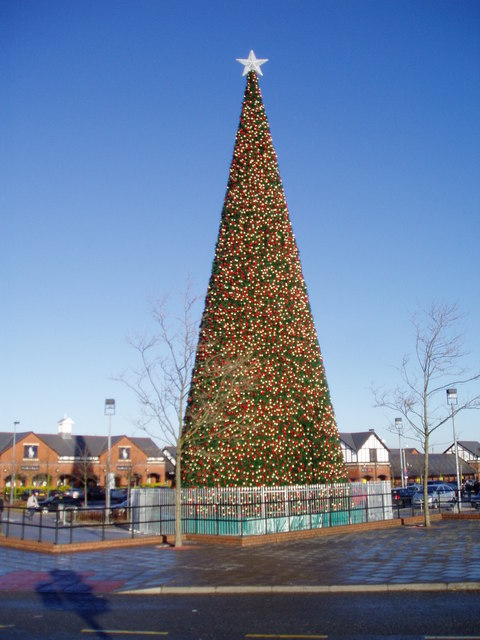
A Christmas tree crowned with a star tree-topper in Little Stanney, Cheshire, in England, UK

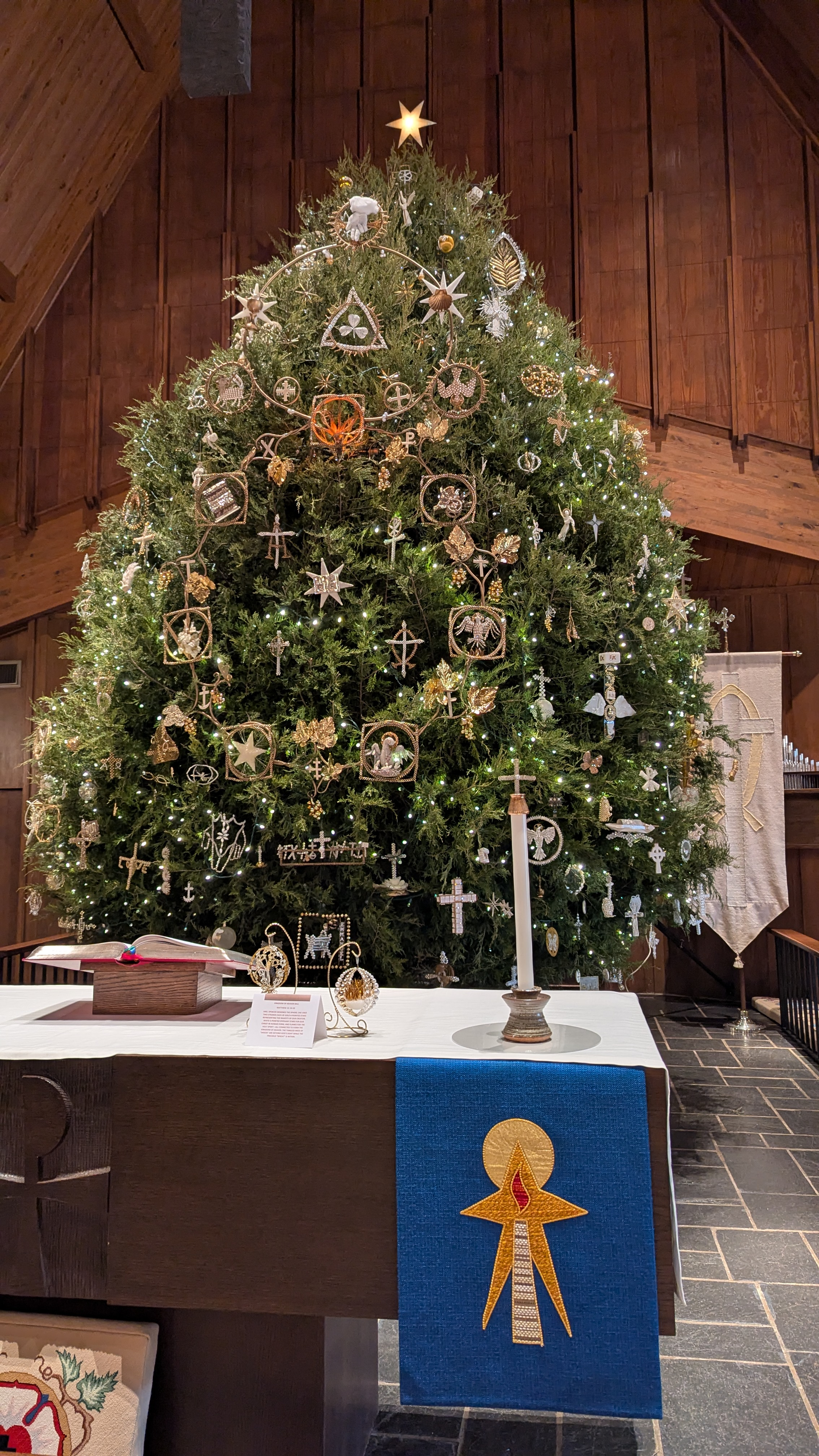
A Chrismon tree in the chancel of a Lutheran church in Danville with a star tree-topper.

A tree-topper or treetopper is a decorative ornament placed on the top (or "crown") of a Christmas tree or Chrismon tree. Tree-toppers come in many forms, with the most common being a star (representing the Star of Bethlehem) or an angel (representing the Angel Gabriel), both from the Nativity. Additional forms range from a Christian cross, white dove, paper rosette, ribbon bow, Father Christmas or Santa Claus.

Tree-toppers may be made of a wide range of materials. Modern plastic tree-toppers are often electric and, once connected with the tree's lights, offer a gentle glow. Following World War II, various symbols of Christmastide, such as stars, were introduced as electrified tree-toppers. The tradition of using a symbol representing the Star of Bethlehem as a tree-topper, however, dates as early as the 1840s.

== Origin and use ==
The use of a Christmas angel as a tree-topper represents the angel Gabriel from the Nativity of Jesus:

And in the sixth month the angel Gabriel was sent from God unto a city of Galilee, named Nazareth, to a virgin espoused to a man whose name was Joseph, of the house of David; and the virgin's name was Mary.

— Luke 1:26–27 (KJV)

Use of a star represents the Star of Bethlehem:

Now when Jesus was born in Bethlehem of Judaea in the days of Herod the king, behold, there came wise men from the east to Jerusalem, saying, 'Where is he that is born King of the Jews? for we have seen his star in the east, and are come to worship him.'

— Matthew 2:1–2 (KJV)

During the 1870s, in conjunction with the growing power of the British Empire, the Union Jack became another popular tree-topper among some persons.

== Popular culture ==
Hans Christian Andersen's 1844 short story, "The Fir-Tree", describes the decoration of a Christmas tree in Denmark, including its topper:

On one branch there hung little nets cut out of colored paper, and each net was filled with sugarplums; and among the other boughs gilded apples and walnuts were suspended, looking as though they had grown there, and little blue and white tapers were placed among the leaves. Dolls that looked for all the world like men—the Tree had never beheld such before—were seen among the foliage, and at the very top a large star of gold tinsel was fixed.

The use of a tree-topper is also depicted in Christmas songs, with lines such as "Först en stjärna utav gull" and "So hang a shining star upon the highest bough".

== Gallery ==
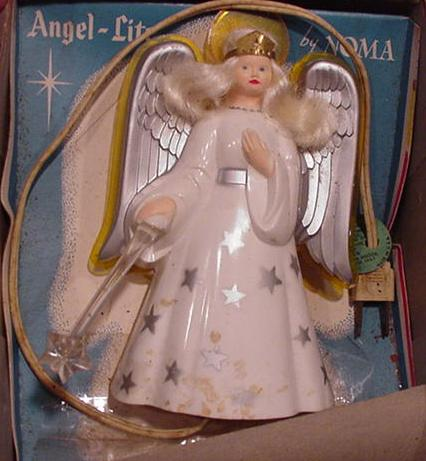
Post-War NOMA plastic, electrified angel tree-topper

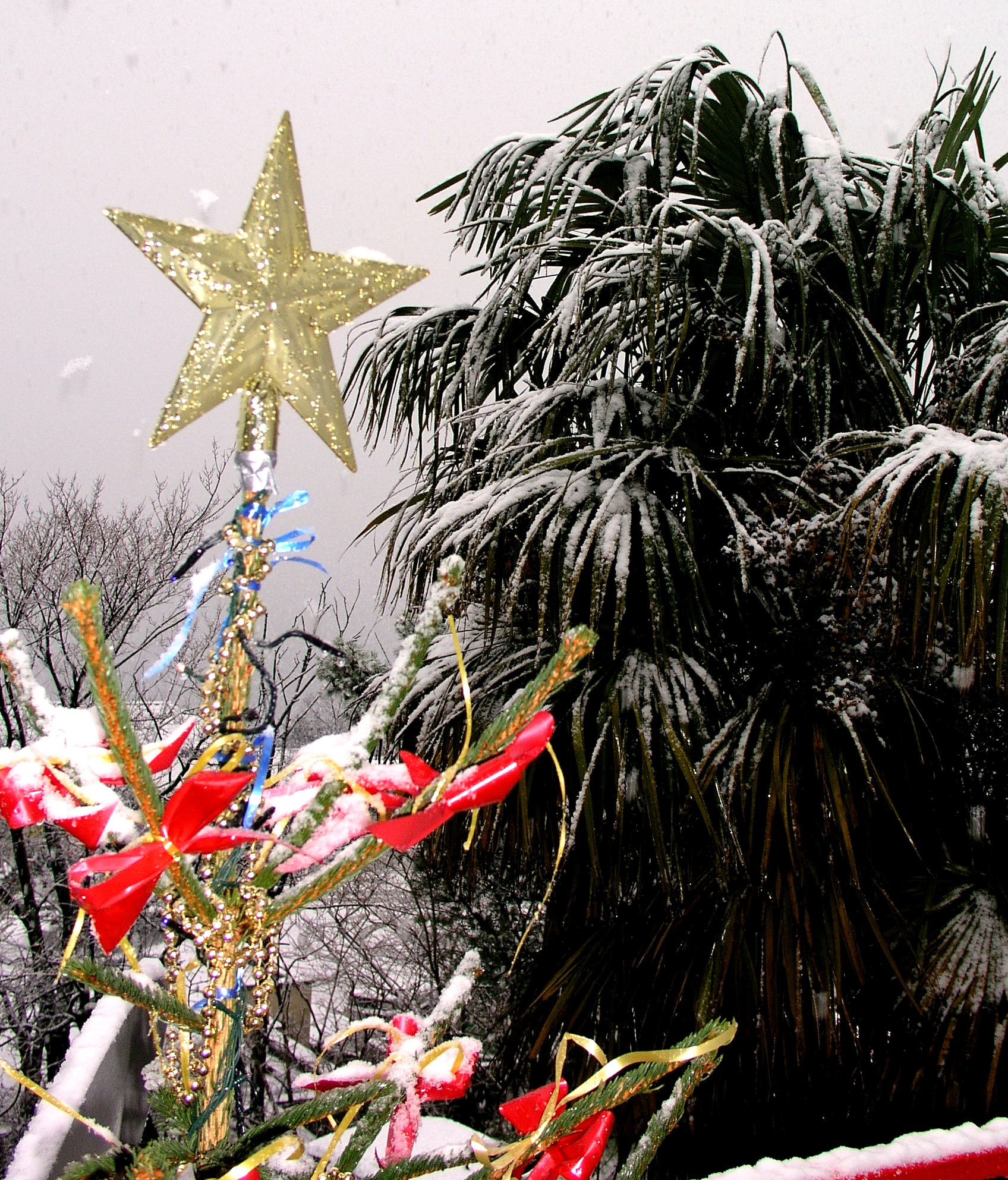
Christmas star in Croatia

Homemade Christmas angel

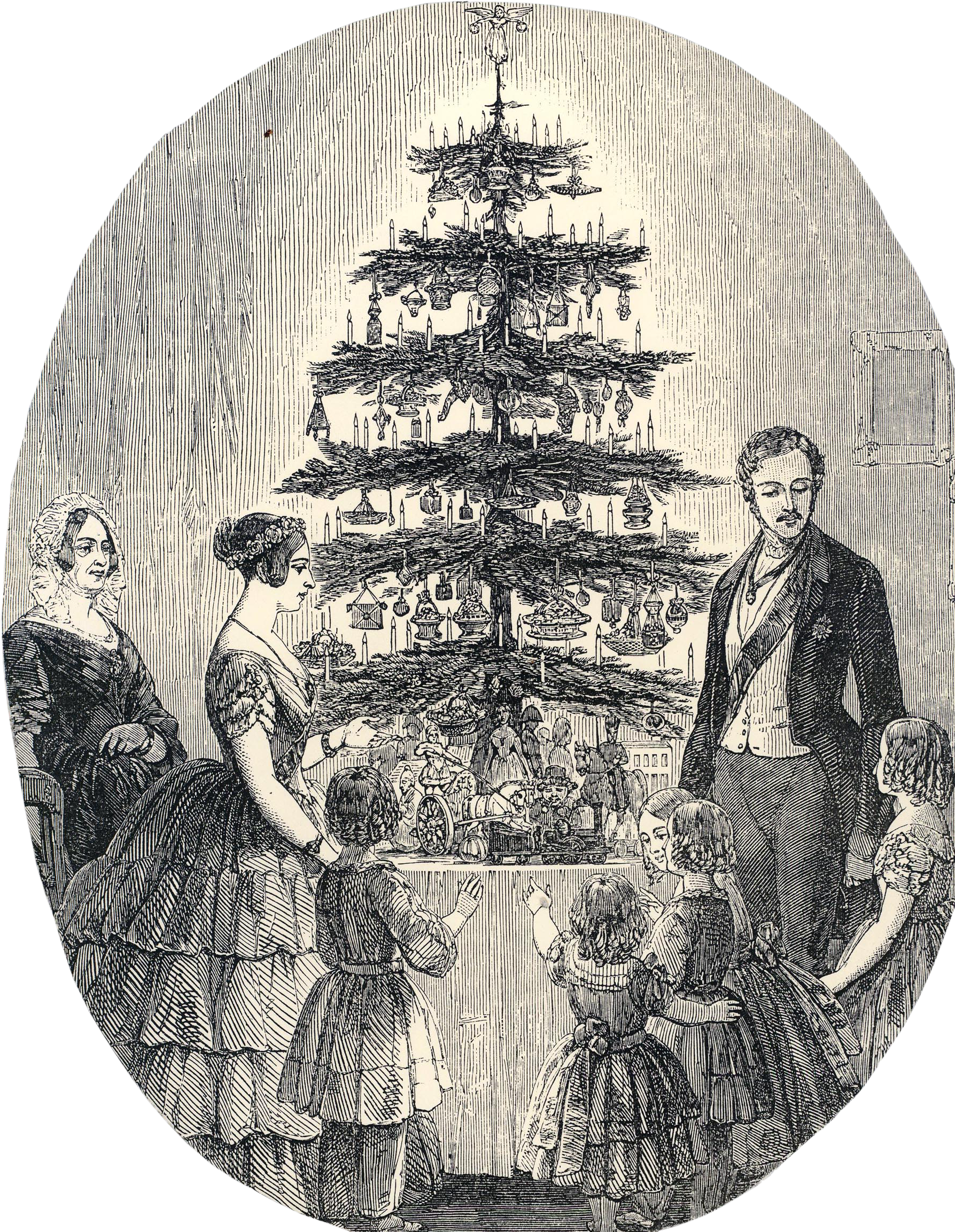
"That pretty German toy, a Christmas tree" (1848), The Illustrated London News

== See also ==
- Christmas tree
- Christmas ornament
