= Christmas Lights Etc =

American Christmas decoration company

Christmas Lights, Etc
- Industry: Retail
- Founded: 2000
- Headquarters: Atlanta, United States
- Website: ChristmasLightsEtc.com

Christmas Lights, Etc. is an American company that specialises in Christmas holiday decorations. The company was founded in 2000 and provides lighting, Christmas Trees and holiday decorations across North America.

In 2006 and 2007, the company featured on the list of Inc Magazines Inc 5000 list.

== History ==
Christmas Lights, Etc. was founded in 2000 and began providing Christmas lights via mail order across the United States. A number of years after their foundation, the company first received mentions in the national press in 2005, when their products featured on the CBS News' The Early Show. The products featured as part of a News feature on how to decorate a home with Christmas decorations.

In 2006 they featured on Inc Magazines Inc 5000 list, which summarised the fastest growing 5000 companies in the United States. At the time, the company had achieved a growth figure of 241% over the previous 3 years. While the company at the time had only 10 full-time employees, the company was achieving a turnover figure of $5.8 million. During that year the company was ranked the 184th fastest growing company in America and remained on the list in 2007.

Following the company's early growth, the company began to offer more LED lighting. These at the time were seen as a greener lighting than traditional Christmas lights, which weren't as energy efficient. This was following a partnership between Christmas Lights, Etc. and Energy Star, which is a joint program of the US Environmental Protection Agency and the US Department of Energy. This move led the company to feature on a number of News Channels, including FOX News discussing the move from traditional Christmas lights to LED.

Despite a downturn in the economy in 2009, the company announced record sales of LED lights a year after the partnership agreement with Energy Star. The LED solution was seen as cost saving by some in the industry and Christmas Lights, Etc. featured in ABC News, Businessweek and FOX Business.

== Products ==
Christmas Lights, Etc. operates as an online retailer, providing and selling Christmas styled products. The company's product line is broken down into 3 main categories, Christmas Lights, Christmas Trees and Christmas Decorations.
