= NOMA (company) =

Trademark and former company

NOMA was a company best known for making Christmas lights. It was once the largest manufacturer of holiday lighting in the world. As of 2021, the rights to the brand in Canada and the United States are owned by Canadian Tire, which sells NOMA-branded products through its namesake stores in Canada, and through an e-commerce website in the United States.

== History ==
=== Background ===
Electric Christmas lights were first used in 1882, but were not commercially available until around 1901, with pre-wired sets available by 1903. By 1920 they were popular, with a range of small and large manufacturers. The lighting sets, or "outfits", were of fixed length, with only limited and difficult to use options available to use more than one string together.

In 1921, Lester Haft filed a patent for a system to interconnect multiple strings. Several small companies licensed the patent from Haft's employer, C. D. Wood Electric. Morris Propp, whose company was the largest manufacturer of the Christmas light outfits, developed a competing interconnection system, and filed his own patent. The Haft patent (US 1512888 A) was granted in 1924, and Propp's (US 1596684 A) in 1926. Before either was granted, some companies licensed the Haft patent, while others developed their own systems that may have been in violation of one or both pending patents.

=== Formation ===
In late 1925, Joseph Bloch and Albert Sadacca organized a trade association of 15 of the Haft patent licensees, all small manufacturers, including C. D. Wood. Block named the trade group National Outfit Manufacturer's Association, or N. O. M. A., and later, simply NOMA. By joining, the companies could consolidate purchasing and gain other efficiencies to improve their competitiveness. This was successful for the 1925 and 1926 seasons, and by the end of 1926, the companies agreed to formally merge into a single manufacturer bearing the NOMA name. NOMA branded light outfits were sold starting in the 1927 season.

Ironically, most of the original partners who formed NOMA were Jewish, and did not celebrate Christmas. Electric Christmas lights started as product line within their novelty or electrical businesses, before coming to dominate their endeavors.

Joseph Block was the first president of the company. In 1928, Propp agreed to merge his company into NOMA, and displaced Block as its president in 1929. He continued to lead the company until his 1933 death from brain cancer, and was then succeeded by Henry Hyman.

=== Fight for control ===
The company was originally based at 340 Hudson Street in New York City. When its lease ended in 1932 it moved to a building owned by Propp at 524 Broadway. That building already housed Propp's original Propp Electrical business, which had become a subsidiary of NOMA. The company was headquartered there for two years.

On Propp's death, Henry Hyman, another of the original Haft licensees forming NOMA, took over as president. He was also president of his original company, United States Electric Corporation (USEC). In 1936, NOMA was looking to develop a product similar to one that was already marketed to a competitor but did not have the facilities to do so. NOMA contracted USEC to produce prototypes and a test commercial run and named the product Cheero-lites. Many of the prototypes failed, and Cheero-lites did not sell well. NOMA withdrew the product from the market.

Block, another of the original NOMA constituent owners and still a director of NOMA's board, sued NOMA; Hyman; Propp's estate (executor Bankers Trust and Propp's son Mortimer Propp); and three other directors (Samuel Cohen, Jacob Lunitz and Joseph H. Tuttle). He charged them with self-dealing in the lease and the Cheero-lites. Shortly thereafter, Sadacca started buying up stock in the company and ousted Hyman. Under Sadacca's leadership, NOMA, a co-defendant, worked to support the plaintiffs.

The judge in the case, J. Bernstein, determined that there was no self-dealing, and the action was designed to harass the defendants as Sadacca's brother Henri was trying to wrest control of NOMA from the individual defendants; Henri Sadacca gained control in early 1939, which is when the dormant lawsuit was pursued vigorously. Bernstein stated that both causes for action were approved by the company directors, including Block; the lease was beneficial to NOMA, at a fair price, saving the company money, and consolidating operations; while the Cheero-lite product development was proposed independent of USEC, did not make USED money, and any defects or lack of sales were ordinary for new products.

=== Innovation ===
NOMA introduced a number of innovations to holiday lighting, including:

- the use of E17 intermediate base lamps for outdoor decorating (1928),
- successful parallel-wired light sets for indoor use (1934),
- all-rubber cords (1940),
- Bubble Lites (1946), and
- fused safety plugs (1951).

When the NOMA Electric Company was located in New York City, it may have produced the first commercial printed circuit board in 1946 with its Party Quiz Game. It was an electrical board game with replaceable question cards and two electrodes which, when placed in the proper positions to answer a question correctly, cause a bulb to light. Initially hard-wired, the game was made thinner by hot pressing aluminum foil onto cardboard, with the electrical contacts made into the board.

== Growth and decline ==
The company survived the stock market crash of 1929 and subsequent economic contraction with clever marketing proposed by Propp. Their advertisements made Christmas lighting seem like an essential part of the holiday, and the holiday celebrations essential in such trying times. The campaign worked, and NOMA was successful from 1929 through the depression years, despite its product being previously viewed as a luxury item.

On Propp's death, Henri Sadacca became president. His family owned one of the original companies that formed NOMA. During World War II, NOMA sold wooden toys for the holiday season, switching its electrical manufacturing to the war effort. Sadacca bought a number of other companies, and focused manufacturing on incendiary devices.

In 1950, NOMA still had 35% of the holiday lighting marketing. In 1953, NOMA separated its Christmas light manufacturing operations into a subsidiary NOMA Lites, Inc. and enjoyed considerable success. Sadacca, by now chairman of the board, together with company president James Ward, formed a plastics company named TICO to vertically integrate manufacturing.

By the early 1960s, the company faced increasing competition from cheaper, imported miniature light sets. Ward was replaced by Morris Goldman for 1963. The company began a policy of reducing manufacturing and relying on cheap buyouts of stock from other companies in the industry as they failed in the face of the cheap imports. Sales still fell in the following two years, and NOMA Lites filed for bankruptcy in 1965, and started using cheaper components, while still assembling in the United States factory, under the name "NOMA Worldwide, Inc." In 1967, this was renamed simply "Worldwide, Inc."

In February 2007, Electrical Components International (ECI) purchased GenTek's wire and cable assembly business known as NOMA Corporation. ECI owns the NOMA brand but is not involved in the design, sourcing or manufacture of these products.

=== European business ===
NOMA's British affiliate was founded in 1939, as a joint venture of NOMA's Toronto subsidiary and various European interests. The operation was called Noma Electric Company Ltd. It continued to succeed independently as the American company failed.

In 1969, after a private buyout, the name changed to NOMA Lights. The LeisureGrow company purchased it in 2014, and it was downgraded to a brand, though LeisureGrow claims the title, via NOMA, of oldest Christmas company in the UK and possibly the world.
