= Albert Sadacca =

Popularised private electric tree lights use

Albert V. Sadacca (February 6, 1901 – December 8, 1980) is credited with popularizing electric Christmas tree lights for private use. According to the legend, in 1917, at the age of 15, after a fire in New York City started by candles suspended in a tree, Sadacca adapted the novelty lighting that his parents sold for use in Christmas trees. Their first version was battery-powered. A similar story is told about Ralph E. Morris, who created an electric light set using a telephone switchboard in 1908. Earlier electric Christmas tree lights had been used in 1885 in Grover Cleveland's White House, and in 1882 at the home of Edward H. Johnson, a vice-president of the Edison Electric Light Company.

Other sources indicate that Albert and his brothers, Henri and Leon, founded their business in 1914 (three years before the fire, when Albert would presumably have been only 12 years old). Nevertheless, in 1925, Sadacca's company, enjoying success in the new Christmas light business, proposed that several companies then competing for the market join together as a trade organization. The name of the organization was The National Outfit Manufacturer's Association. The association merged into a single company the following year, and began several decades of dominance in the rapidly growing Christmas lighting market as the NOMA Electric Company. The heads of other affiliates managed the firm for several years, until Sadacca's brother Henri took over the company.

Sadacca was originally from Madrid, Spain, and a recent immigrant when he set about developing Christmas lights. He helped found NOMA, but his family's company did not control it until 1939, when Henri Sadacca orchestrated a stock buyout. Albert was long-time president and chairman of the company, into the late 1970s. In 1979, he gave up the presidency (the New York Times has him about 15 years younger than other source, with their calculation for his birth coinciding with the year he is credited with first developing commercial Christmas lights).

Sadacca and his wife Helene owned many racehorses. A son, Albert V. Sadacca II, joined the business in the 1960s, and was Vice President and Director of International Operations.
