= Christmas lights =

Decorative lighting used at Christmastime

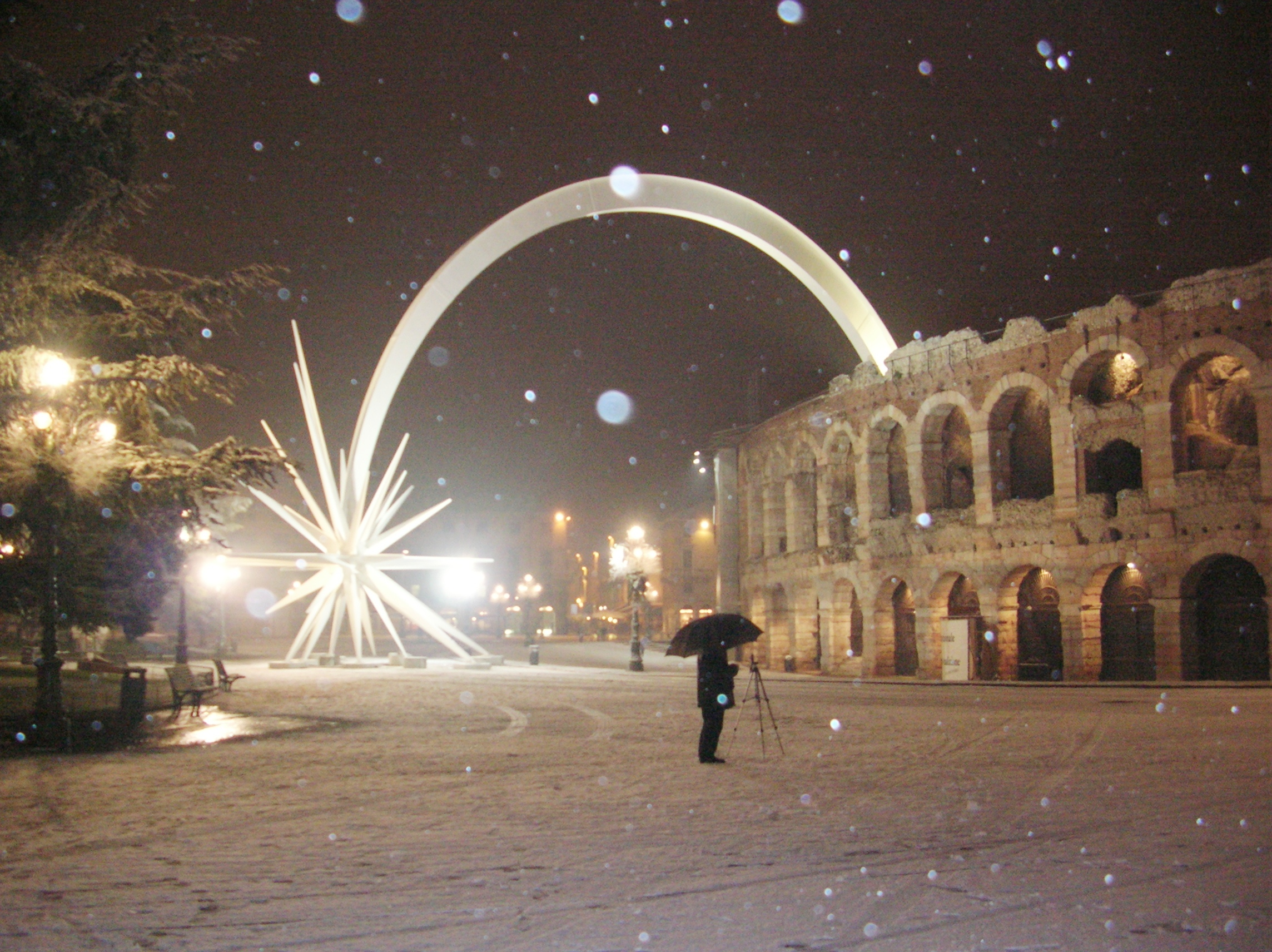
Christmas lights in Verona, Italy

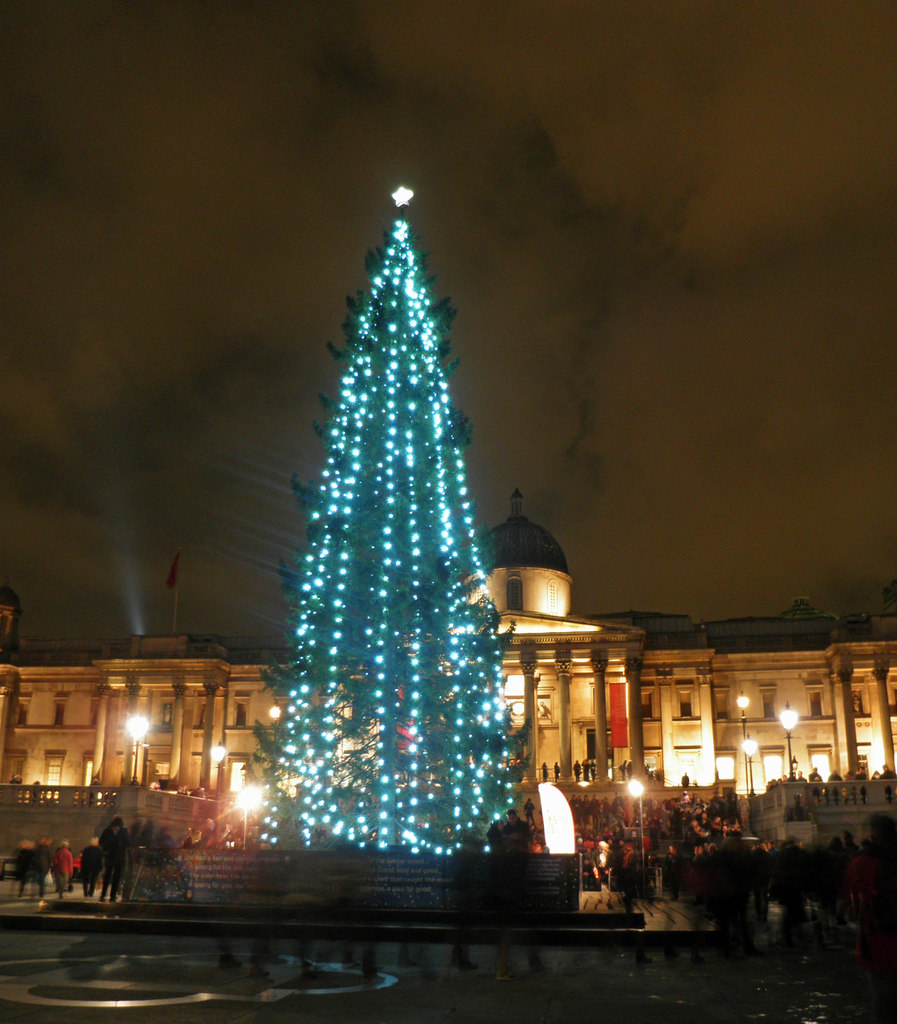
Trafalgar Square Christmas Tree with lights in London, England

Christmas lights (also known as fairy lights, festive lights or string lights) are lights often used for decoration in celebration of Christmas, often on display throughout the Christmas season including Advent and Christmastide. The custom goes back to when Christmas trees were decorated with candles, which symbolized Christ being the light of the world. The Christmas trees were brought by Christians into their homes in early modern Germany.

Christmas trees displayed publicly and illuminated with electric lights became popular in the early 20th century. By the mid-20th century, it became customary to display strings of electric lights along streets and on buildings; Christmas decorations detached from the Christmas tree itself. In the United States, Canada and Europe, it became popular to outline private homes with such Christmas lights in tract housing starting in the 1960s. By the late 20th century, the custom had also been adopted in other nations, including outside the Western world, notably in Japan and Hong Kong. It has since spread throughout Christendom.

In many countries, Christmas lights, as well as other Christmas decorations, are traditionally erected on or around the first day of Advent. In the Western Christian world, the two traditional days when Christmas lights are removed are Twelfth Night and Candlemas, the latter of which ends the Christmas-Epiphany season in some denominations. Taking down Christmas decorations before Twelfth Night, as well as leaving the decorations up beyond Candlemas is historically considered to be inauspicious.

== History ==
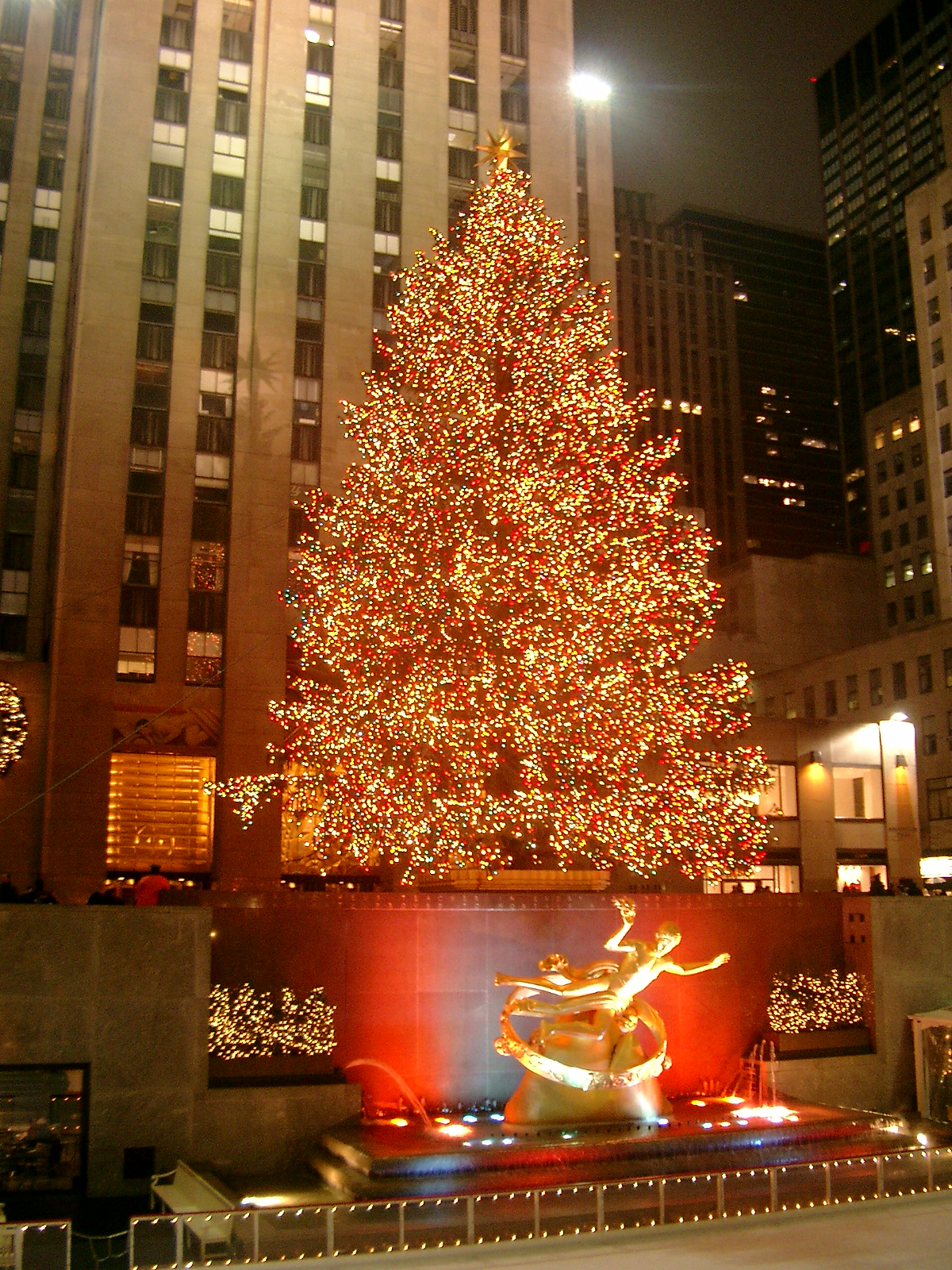
The Rockefeller Center Christmas Tree in New York City

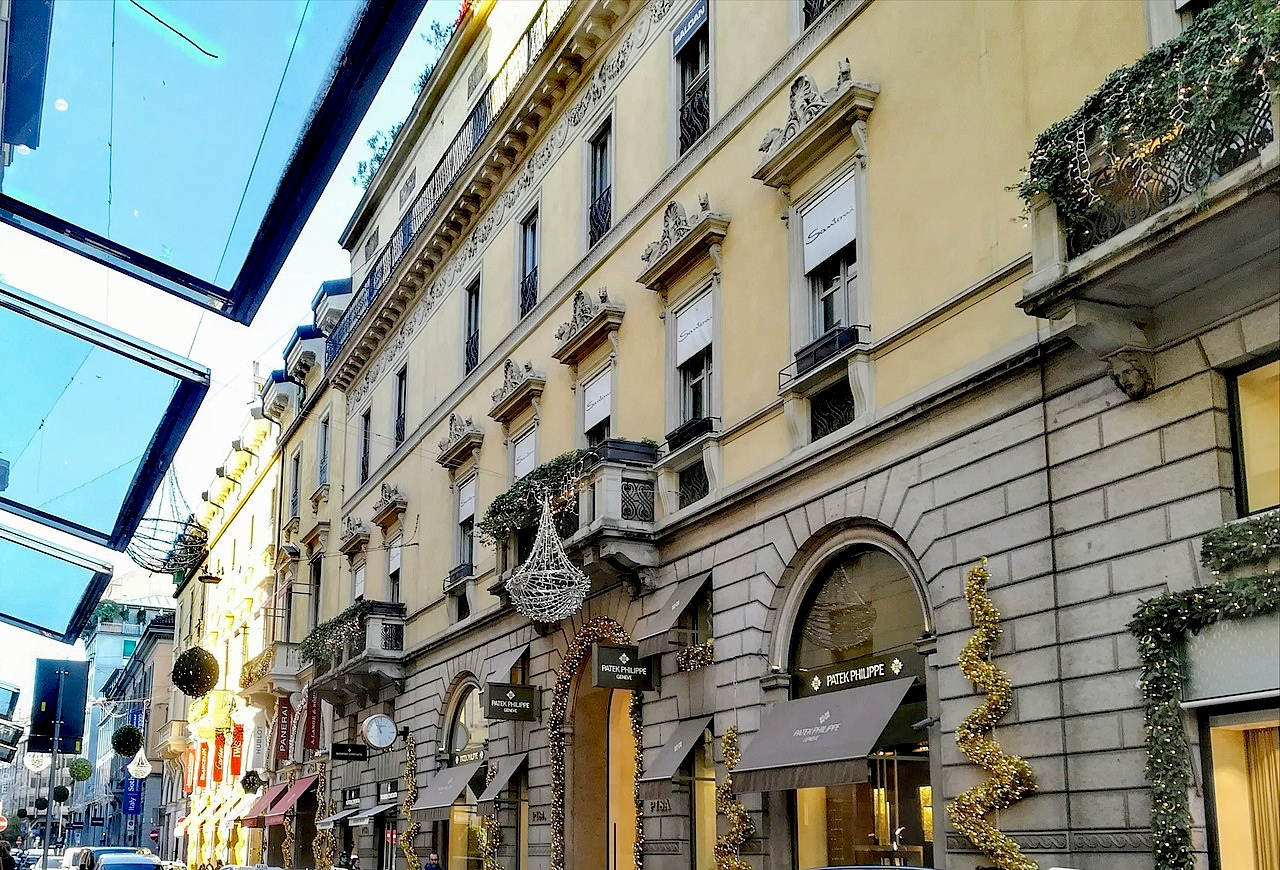
Decorations and lights adorn Via Monte Napoleone, Quadrilatero della moda, Milan, Italy

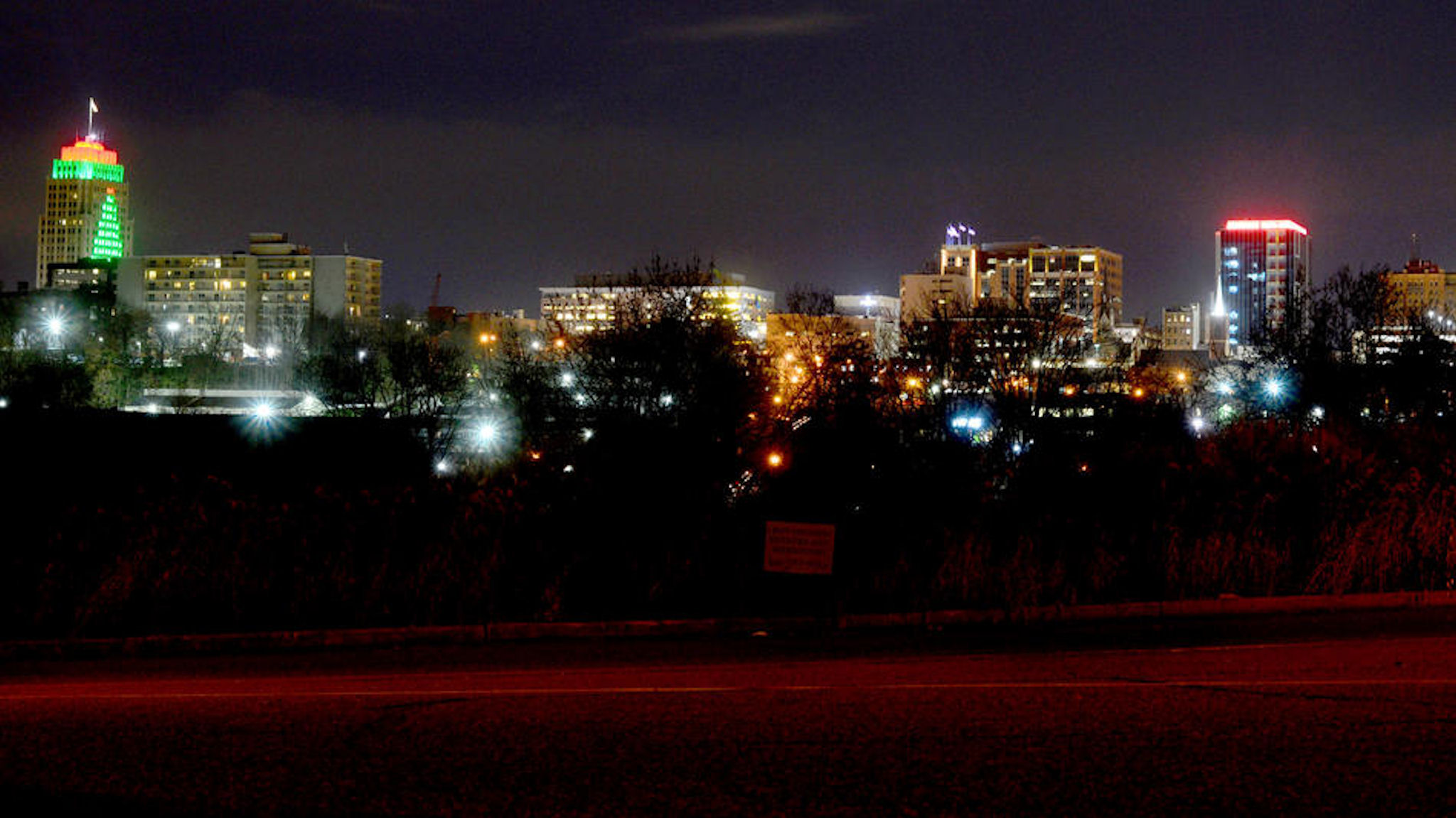
Christmas lights radiate from the city buildings in Allentown, Pennsylvania.

The Christmas tree was first recorded to be used by the Lutheran Christians in the 16th century, with records indicating that a Christmas tree was placed in the Cathedral of Strasbourg in 1539, under the leadership of the Protestant Reformer, Martin Bucer. In homes, "German Lutherans brought the decorated Christmas tree with them; the Moravians put lighted candles on those trees." These candles symbolized Jesus as the Light of the World. The Christmas tree was adopted in upper-class homes in 18th-century Germany, where it was occasionally decorated with candles, which at the time was a comparatively expensive light source. Candles for the tree were glued with melted wax to a tree branch or attached by pins. Around 1890, candleholders were first used for Christmas candles. Between 1902 and 1914, small lanterns and glass balls to hold the candles started to be used. Early electric Christmas lights were introduced with electrification, beginning in the 1880s.

The illuminated Christmas tree became established in the UK during Queen Victoria's reign, and through emigration spread to North America and Australia. In her journal for Christmas Eve 1832, the 13-year-old princess wrote, "After dinner.. we then went into the drawing-room near the dining-room. There were two large round tables on which were placed two trees hung with lights and sugar ornaments. All the presents being placed round the trees". Until the availability of inexpensive electrical power in the early 20th century, miniature candles were commonly (and in some cultures still are) used.

=== United States ===
The first known electrically illuminated Christmas tree was the creation of Edward H. Johnson, an associate of inventor Thomas Edison. While he was vice president of the Edison Electric Light Company, he had Christmas tree light bulbs especially made for him. He proudly displayed his Christmas tree, which was hand-wired with 80 red, white and blue electric incandescent light bulbs the size of walnuts, in December 1882 at his home near Fifth Avenue in New York City. Local newspapers ignored the story, seeing it as a publicity stunt. However, it was published by a Detroit newspaper reporter, and Johnson has become widely regarded as the Father of Electric Christmas Tree Lights. By 1900, businesses started stringing up Christmas lights behind their windows. Christmas lights were too expensive for the average person; as such, electric Christmas lights did not become the majority replacement for candles until 1930.

In 1895, US President Grover Cleveland sponsored the first electrically lit Christmas tree in the White House. It featured over a hundred multicolored lights. The first commercially produced Christmas tree lamps were manufactured in strings of multiples of eight sockets by the General Electric Co. of Harrison, New Jersey. Each socket accepted a miniature two-candela carbon-filament lamp.

The first recorded uses of Christmas lights on outdoor trees occurred in San Diego in 1904; Appleton, Wisconsin, in 1909; and New York City in 1912. McAdenville, North Carolina, claims to have been the first in 1956. The Library of Congress credits the town for inventing "the tradition of decorating evergreen trees with Christmas lights dates back to 1956 when the McAdenville Men's Club conceived of the idea of decorating a few trees around the McAdenville Community Center." However, the Rockefeller Center Christmas Tree has had "lights" since 1931, but did not have real electric lights until 1956. Furthermore, Philadelphia's Christmas Light Show and Disney's Christmas Tree also began in 1956. In Canada, archival photos taken in 1956 around suburban Toronto capture several instances of outdoor evergreens illuminated with Christmas lights. Though General Electric sponsored community lighting competitions during the 1920s, it would take until the mid-1950s for the use of such lights to be adopted by average households.

Christmas lights found use in places other than Christmas trees. By 1919, city electrician John Malpiede began decorating the new Civic Center Park in Denver, Colorado, eventually expanding the display to the park's Greek Amphitheater and later to the adjacent new Denver City and County Building - City Hall upon its completion in 1932. Soon, strings of lights adorned mantles and doorways inside homes, and ran along the rafters, roof lines, and porch railings of homes and businesses. In recent times, many city skyscrapers are decorated with long mostly-vertical strings of a common theme, and are activated simultaneously in Grand Illumination ceremonies.

In 1963, a boycott of Christmas lights was done in Greenville, North Carolina, to protest the segregation that kept blacks from being employed by downtown businesses in Greenville, during the Christmas sales season. Known as the Black Christmas boycott or "Christmas Sacrifice", it was an effective way to protest the cultural and fiscal segregation in the town with 33% black population. Light decorations in the homes, on the Christmas trees, or outside the house were not shown, and only six houses in the black community broke the boycott that Christmas.

In 1973, during an oil shortage triggered by an embargo by the Organization of Arab Petroleum Exporting Countries (later OPEC), President Nixon asked Americans not to put up Christmas lights to conserve energy use. Many Americans complied, and there were fewer displays that year.

In the mid-2000s, the video of the home of Carson Williams was widely distributed on the internet as a viral video. It garnered national attention in 2005 from The Today Show on NBC, Inside Edition and the CBS Evening News and was featured in a Miller television commercial. Williams turned his hobby into a commercial venture, and was commissioned to scale up his vision to a scale of 250,000 lights at a Denver shopping center, as well as displays in parks and zoos.

== Technology ==
A 1950s set of fluorescent Christmas lights

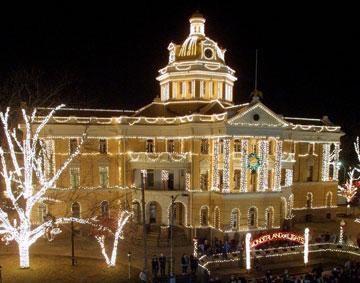
The Old Harrison County Courthouse in Marshall, Texas, outlined in Christmas lights

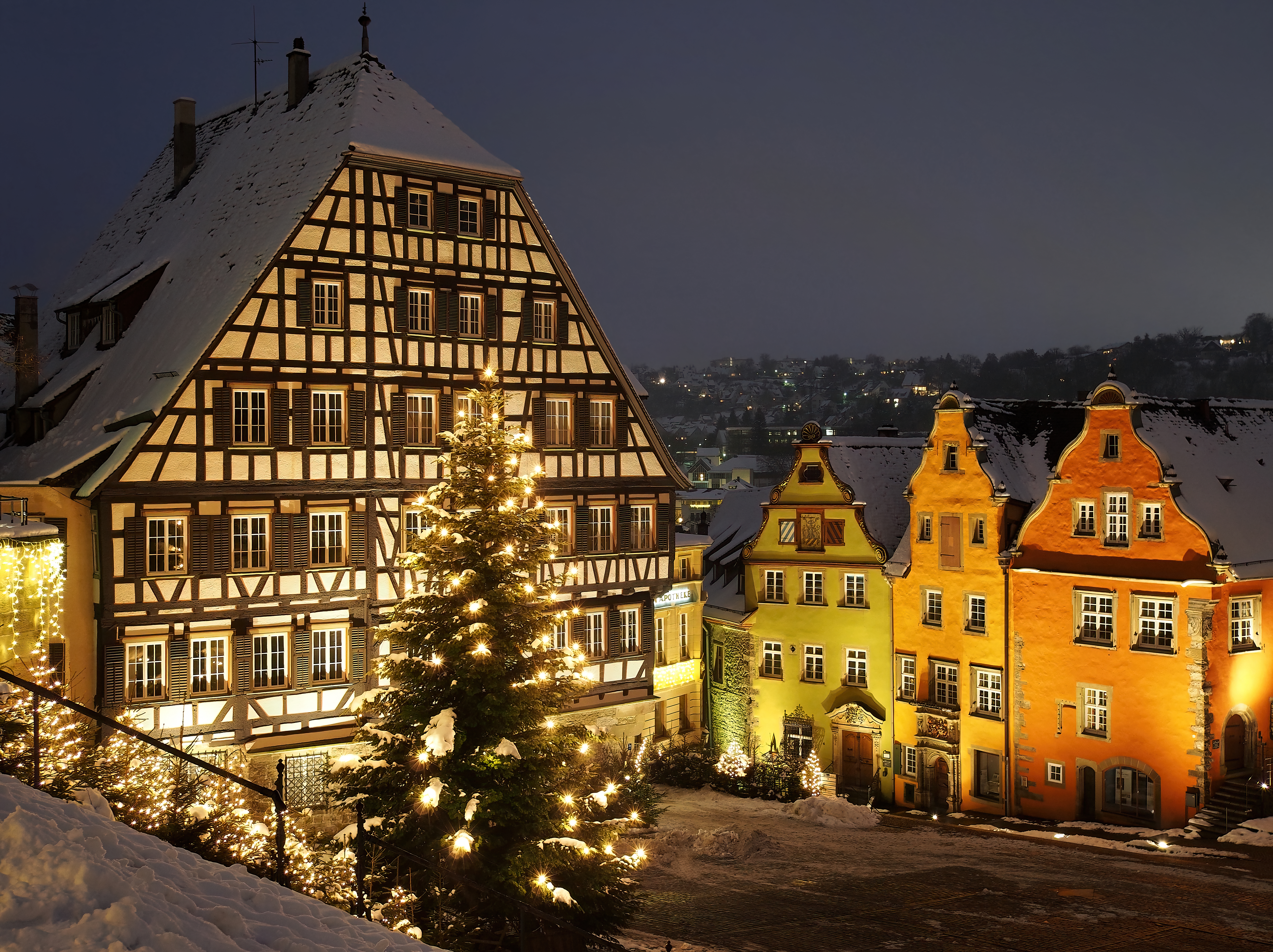
Schwäbisch Hall

The technology used in Christmas lighting displays is highly diverse, ranging from simple light strands, Christmas lights (a.k.a. Fairy lights), through to full blown animated tableaux, involving complex illuminated animatronics and statues.

Christmas lights (also called twinkle lights, holiday lights, mini lights or fairy lights), that are strands of electric lights used to decorate homes, public/commercial buildings and Christmas trees during the Christmas season are amongst the most recognized forms of Christmas lighting. Christmas lights come in a dazzling array of configurations and colors. The small "midget" bulbs commonly known as fairy lights are also called Italian lights in some parts of the U.S., such as Chicago. The first miniature Christmas lights were manufactured in Italy.

The types of lamps used in Christmas lighting also vary considerably, reflecting the diversity of modern lighting technology in general. Common lamp types are incandescent light bulbs and now light-emitting diodes (LEDs), which are being increasingly encouraged as being more energy efficient. Less common are neon lamp sets. Fluorescent lamp sets were produced for a limited time by Sylvania in the mid-1940s.

Christmas lights using incandescent bulbs are somewhat notorious for being difficult to troubleshoot and repair. In the 1950s and 1960s, the series circuit connected light sets would go completely dark when a single bulb failed. So in the fairly recent past, the mini-lights have come with shunts to allow a set to continue to operate with a burned out bulb. However, if there are multiple bulb failures or a shunt is bad, the string can still fail. There are two basic ways to troubleshoot this: a one by one replacement with a known good bulb, or by using a test light to find out where the voltage gets interrupted.

When Christmas light manufacturers first started using LEDs the colors seemed very dull and uninspiring. Even the white lights, which were typically single-chip LEDs, glowed with a faintly yellowish color that made them look cheap and unattractive according to the general public at the time.

== Outdoor displays ==
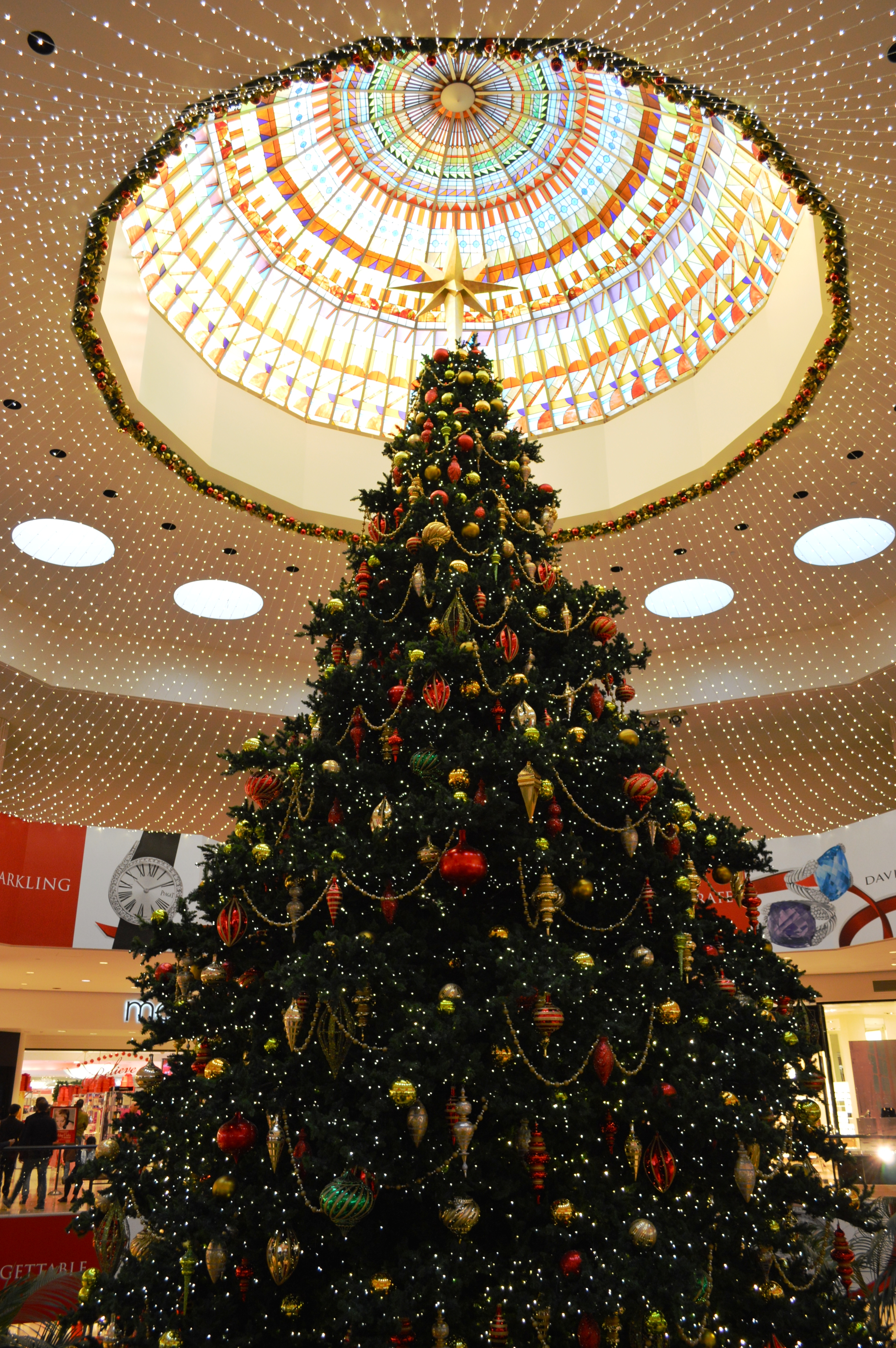
South Coast Plaza Christmas tree

=== Public venues ===
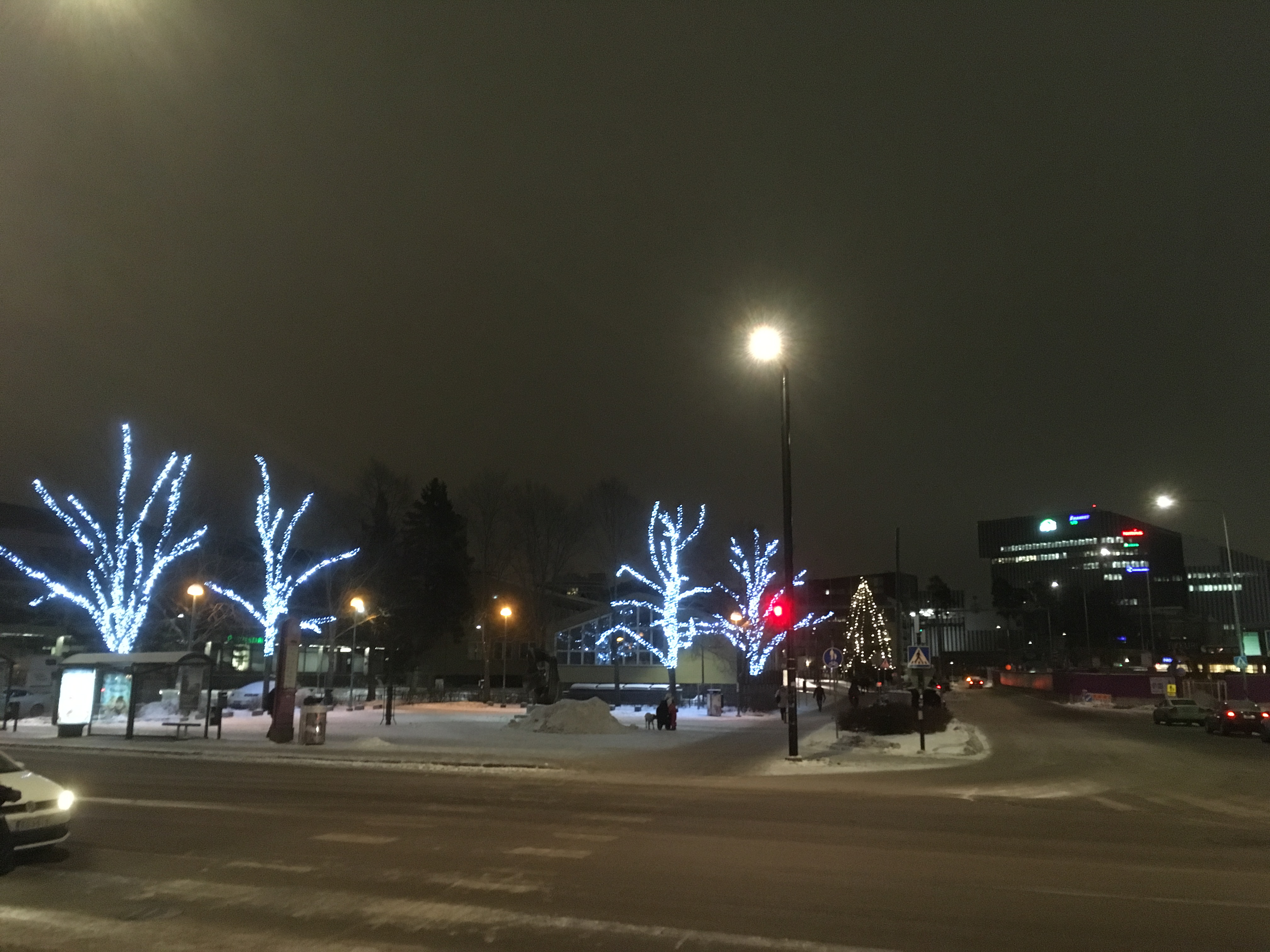
A Christmas light decorated trees in Tikkurila, Vantaa, Finland

Displays of Christmas lights in public venues and on public buildings are a popular part of the annual celebration of Christmas, and may be set up by businesses or by local governments. The displays utilize Christmas lights in many ways, including decking towering Christmas trees in public squares, street trees and park trees, adorning lampposts and other such structures, decorating significant buildings such as town halls and department stores, and lighting up popular tourist attractions such as the Eiffel Tower and the Sydney Opera House. It is believed that the first outdoor public electric light Christmas Holiday display was organized by Fredrick Nash and the Pasadena Chamber of Commerce in Altadena, California, on Santa Rosa Avenue, called Christmas Tree Lane. Christmas Tree Lane in Altadena has been continuously lit except during WW2 since 1920. Annual displays in Regent Street and Oxford Street, London, date from 1954 and 1959 respectively.

=== Neighborhoods ===
Outdoor lighting outfits for the home were offered in quantity starting in the 1930s. By the 1960s, with the popularity of tract housing in the US, it became increasingly common to outline the house (particularly the eaves) with weatherproof Christmas lights. The Holiday Trail of Lights is a joint effort by cities in east Texas and northwest Louisiana that had its origins in the Festival of Lights and Christmas Festival in Natchitoches, started in 1927, making it one of the oldest light festivals in the US. Fulton Street in Palo Alto, California, has the nickname "Christmas Tree Lane" due to the display of lighted Christmas trees along the street.

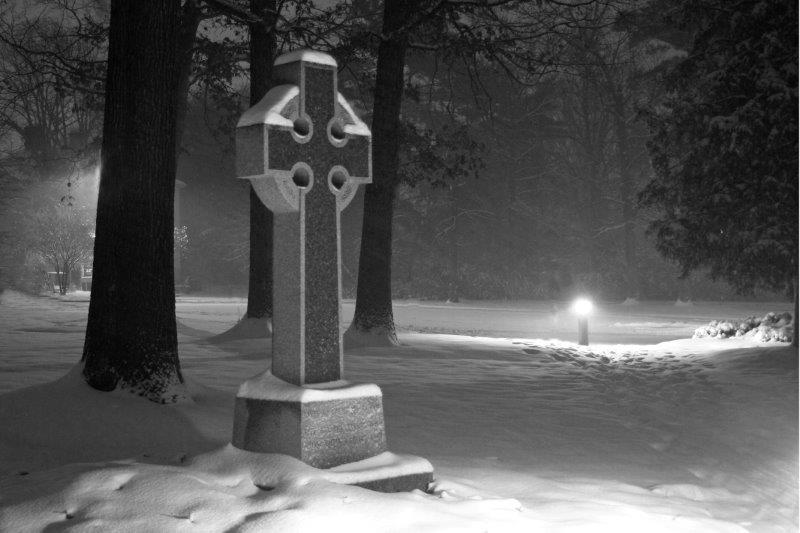
Illuminated Celtic cross, Bon Air Presbyterian Church, Virginia, in snow storm at night

A familiar pastime during the holiday season is to drive or walk around neighborhoods in the evening to see the lights displayed on homes. While some homes have no lights, others may have ornate displays requiring weeks to construct. Some displays are created for charities or local councils, for instance an annual display in Sleaford, Lincolnshire, is hosted around the Christmas period to raise money for their Lincolnshire and Nottingham air ambulances. They successfully raised £1,389.09 during their 2022 attempt. A few have made it to the Extreme Christmas TV specials shown on HGTV, at least one requiring a generator and another requiring separate electrical service to supply the electrical power required. In Australia and New Zealand, chains of Christmas lights were quickly adopted as an effective way to provide ambient lighting to verandas, where cold beer is often served in the hot summer evenings. Since the late 20th century, increasingly elaborate Christmas lights have been displayed, and driving around between 8 and 10 p.m. to view the lights has become a popular form of family entertainment. In some areas Christmas lighting becomes a fierce competition, with town councils offering awards for the best decorated house, in other areas it is seen as a co-operative effort, with residents priding themselves on their street or their neighbourhood. Today it is estimated that more than 150 million light sets are sold in America each year, with more than 80 million homes decorated with holiday lights. The town of McAdenville, North Carolina, United States have a tradition called Christmas Town USA where the entire town is decorated with Christmas lights. The town of Lobethal, South Australia, in the Adelaide Hills, is famed for its Christmas lighting displays. Many residents expend great effort to have the best light display in the town. Residents from the nearby city of Adelaide often drive to the town to view them. In the US, the television series The Great Christmas Light Fight features homes across the country in a competition of homes with elaborate Christmas light displays.

== Other holidays ==
In the United States, lights have been produced for many other holidays. These may be simple sets in typical holiday colors, or the type with plastic ornaments which the light socket fits into. Light sculptures are also produced in typical holiday icons.

Halloween is the most popular, with miniature light strings having black-insulated wires and semi-opaque orange bulbs. Later sets had some transparent purple bulbs (a representation of black, similar to blacklight), a few even have transparent green, or a translucent or semi-opaque lime green (possibly representing slime as in Ghostbusters, or creatures like goblins or space aliens). Two types of icicle lights are sold at Halloween: all-orange, and a combination of purple and green known as "slime lights".

Easter lights are often produced in pastels. These typically have white wire and connectors.

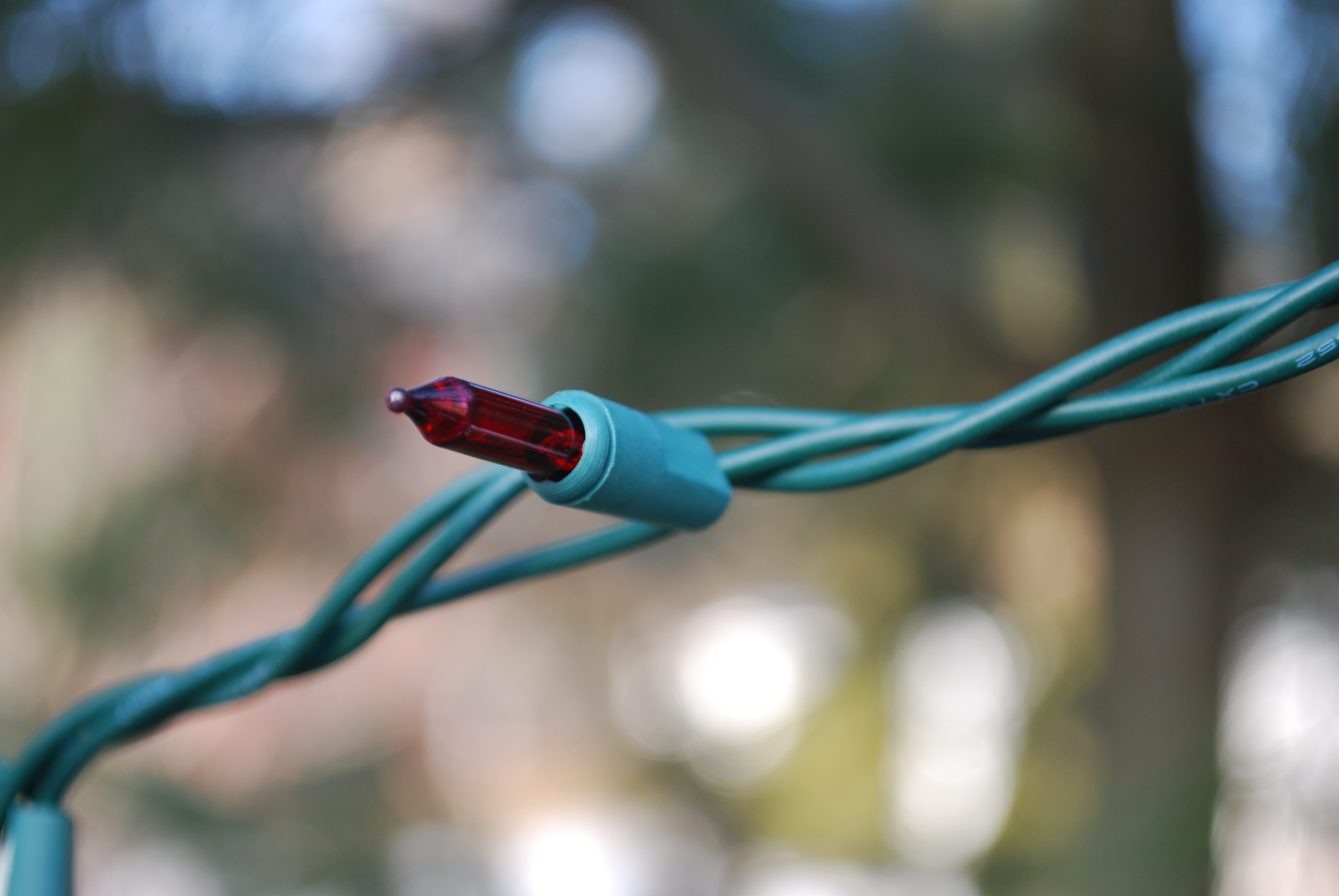
Closeup of a mini light

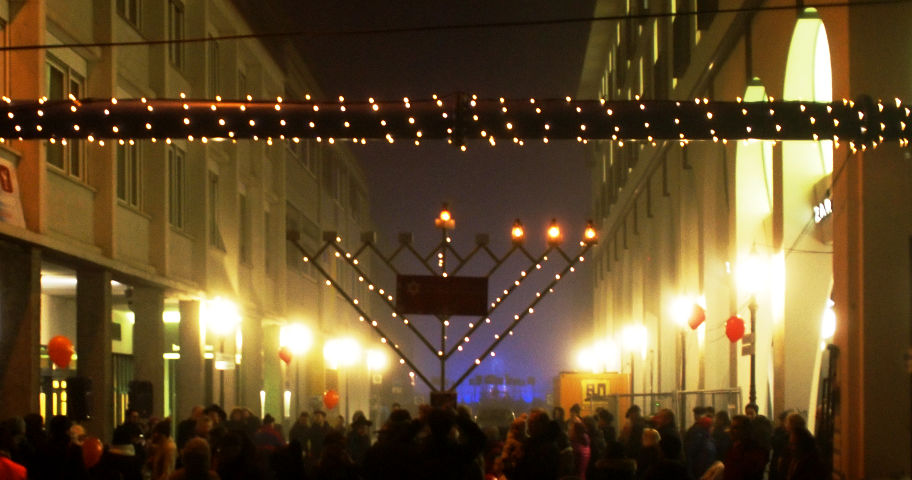
Strings on piping and on a menorah

Red, white, and blue lights are produced for Independence Day, as well as U.S. flag and other patriotic-themed ornaments. Net lights have been produced with the lights in a U.S. flag pattern. In 2006, some stores carried stakes with LEDs that light fiber-optics, looking similar to fireworks.

These above light strings are occasionally used on Christmas trees anyway, usually to add extra variety to the colors of the lights on the tree.

Various types of patio lighting with no holiday theme are also made for summertime. These are often clear white lights, but most are ornament sets, such as lanterns made of metal or bamboo, or plastic ornaments in the shape of barbecue condiments, flamingos and palm trees, or even various beers. Some are made of decorative wire or mesh, in abstract shapes such as dragonflies, often with glass "gems" or marbles. Light sculptures are also made in everything from wire-mesh frogs to artificial palm trees outlined in rope lights.

In Pakistan, fairy lights are often used to decorate in celebration of Eid ul-Fitr at Chaand Raat, which occurs at the end of Ramadan. In India, homes, shops and streets are decorated with strings of fairy lights during Diwali.

== Environment, recycling, and safety ==
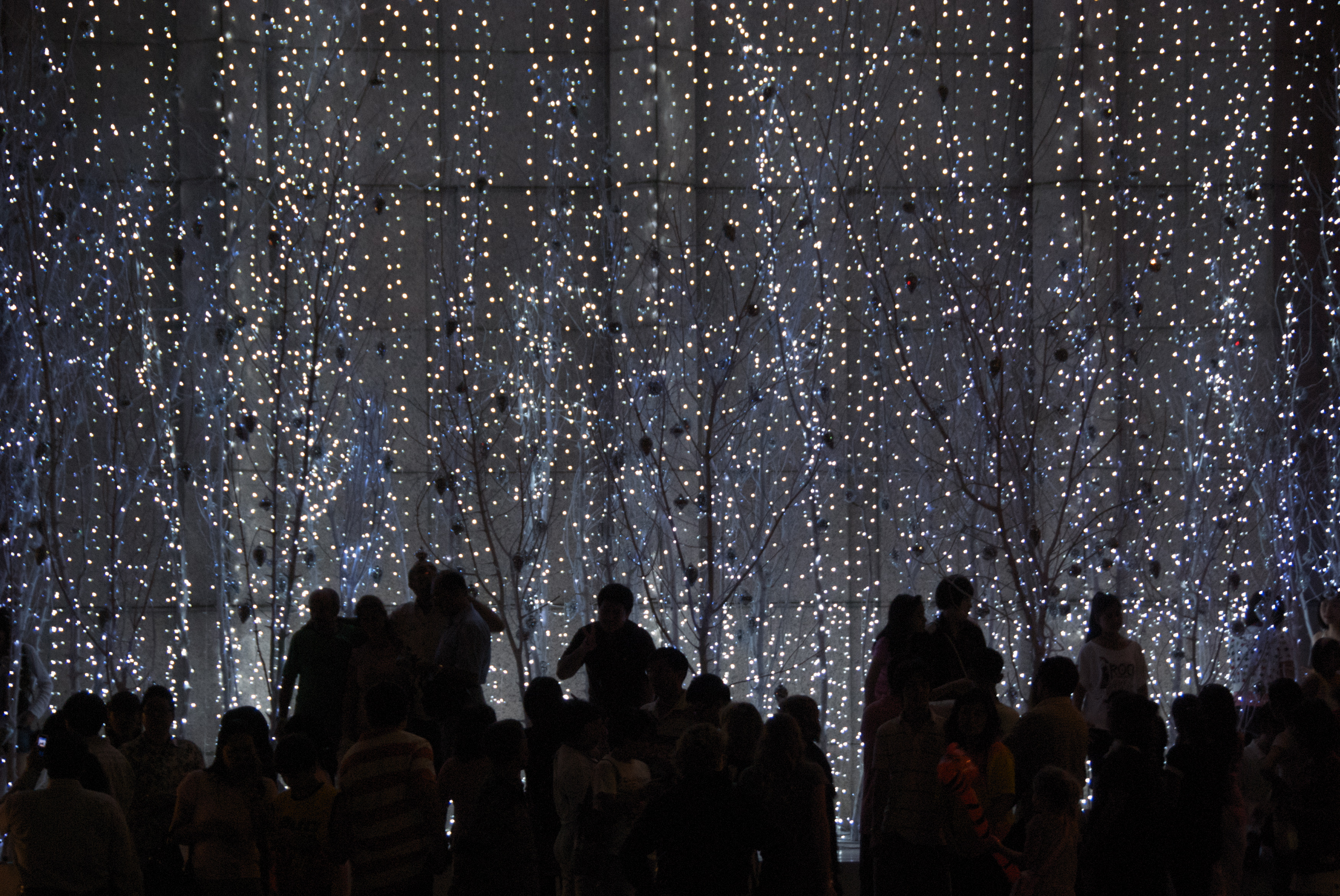
Christmas lights, Bangkok

Christmas lighting leads to some recycling issues. Annually more than 20 million pounds (9,100 tonnes) of discarded holiday lights are shipped to Shijiao, China, which has been referred to as "the world capital for recycling Christmas lights". The region began importing discarded lights c. 1990 in part because of its cheap labor and low environmental standards. As late as 2009, many factories burned the lights to melt the plastic and retrieve the copper wire, releasing toxic fumes into the environment. A safer technique was developed that involved chopping the lights into a fine sand-like consistency, mixing it with water and vibrating the slurry on a table causing the different elements to separate out, similar to the process of panning for gold. Everything is recycled: copper, brass, plastic and glass.

More cities in the US are establishing schemes to recycle Christmas lights, with towns organizing drop-off points for handing in old lights.

As of December 2019, most scrap metal recycling centers will purchase traditional incandescent Christmas lights for between $0.10–$0.20 per pound ($0.22–$0.44/kg). This scrap value is primarily derived from the recycling value of the copper found inside the wire, and to a lesser degree, other metals and alloys. As an example, a standard 20-foot (6 m) strand of modern incandescent Christmas lights weighing about 0.72 pounds (0.33 kg) was found to have less than 20% recoverable copper by weight.

Installing holiday lighting may be a safety hazard when incorrectly connecting several strands of lights, repeatedly using the same extension cords for the lights to plug into or using an unsafe ladder during the installation process.

== Light sculptures ==
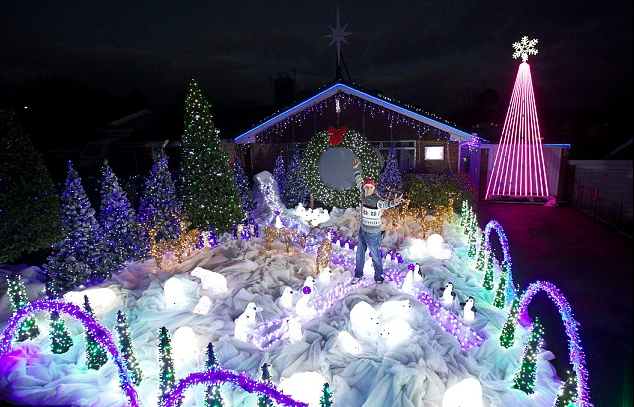
Manning Close Christmas Light Show, Wells, Somerset, England

Christmas light sculptures, also called motifs, are used as Christmas decorations and for other holidays. Originally, these were large wireframe metalwork pieces made for public displays, such as for a municipal government to place on utility poles, and shopping centers to place on lampposts. Since the 1990s, these are also made in small plastic home versions that can be hung in a window, or on a door or wall. Framed motifs can be lit using mini lights or rope light, and larger scale motifs and sculptures may use C7 bulbs.

Light sculptures can be either flat (most common) or three-dimensional. Flat sculptures are the motifs, and are often on metal frames, but garland can also be attached to outdoor motifs. Indoor motifs often have a multicolored plastic backing sheet, sometimes holographic. 3D sculptures include deer or reindeer (even moose) in various positions, and with or without antlers, often with a motor to move the head up and down or side to side as if grazing. These and other 3D displays may be bare-frame, or be covered with garland, looped and woven transparent plastic cord or acrylic, or natural or goldtone-painted vines. Snowflakes are a popular design for municipal displays, so as not to be misconstrued as a government endorsement of religion, or so they can be left up all winter.

Some places make huge displays of these during December, such as Callaway Gardens, Life University, and Lake Lanier Islands in the U.S. state of Georgia. In east Tennessee, the cities of Chattanooga, Sevierville, Pigeon Forge, and Gatlinburg have light sculptures up all winter. Gatlinburg also has custom ones for Valentine's Day and St. Patrick's Day, while Pigeon Forge puts flowers on its tall lampposts for spring, and for winter has a steamboat and the famous picture of U.S. Marines Raising the Flag on Iwo Jima, in addition to the city's historic Old Mill.

Some sculptures have microcontrollers that sequence circuits of lights, so that the object appears to be in motion. This is used for things such as snowflakes falling, Santa Claus waving, a peace dove flapping its wings, or train wheels rolling.

=== Examples ===
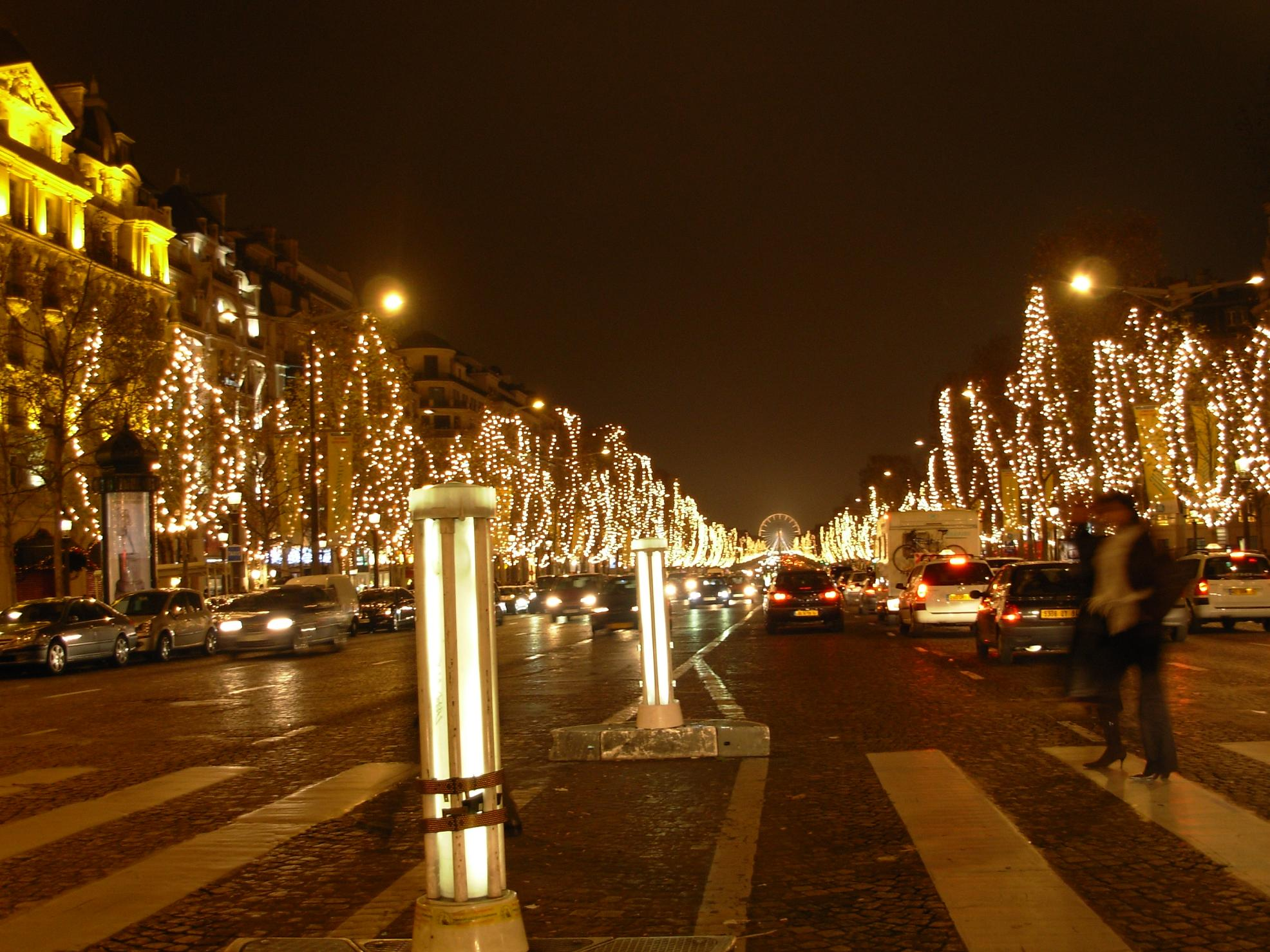
Champs-Élysées

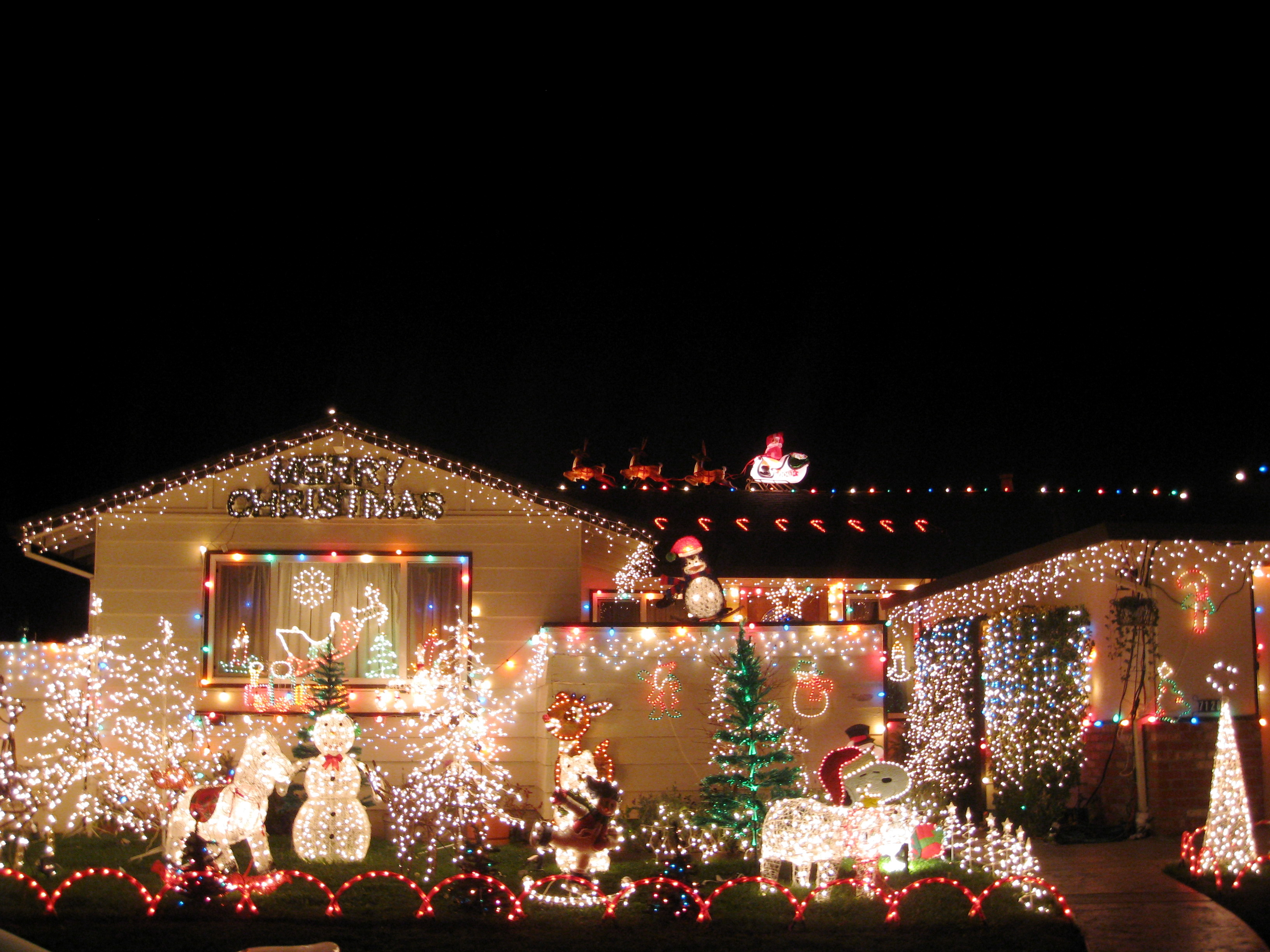
Christmas in Dublin, CA

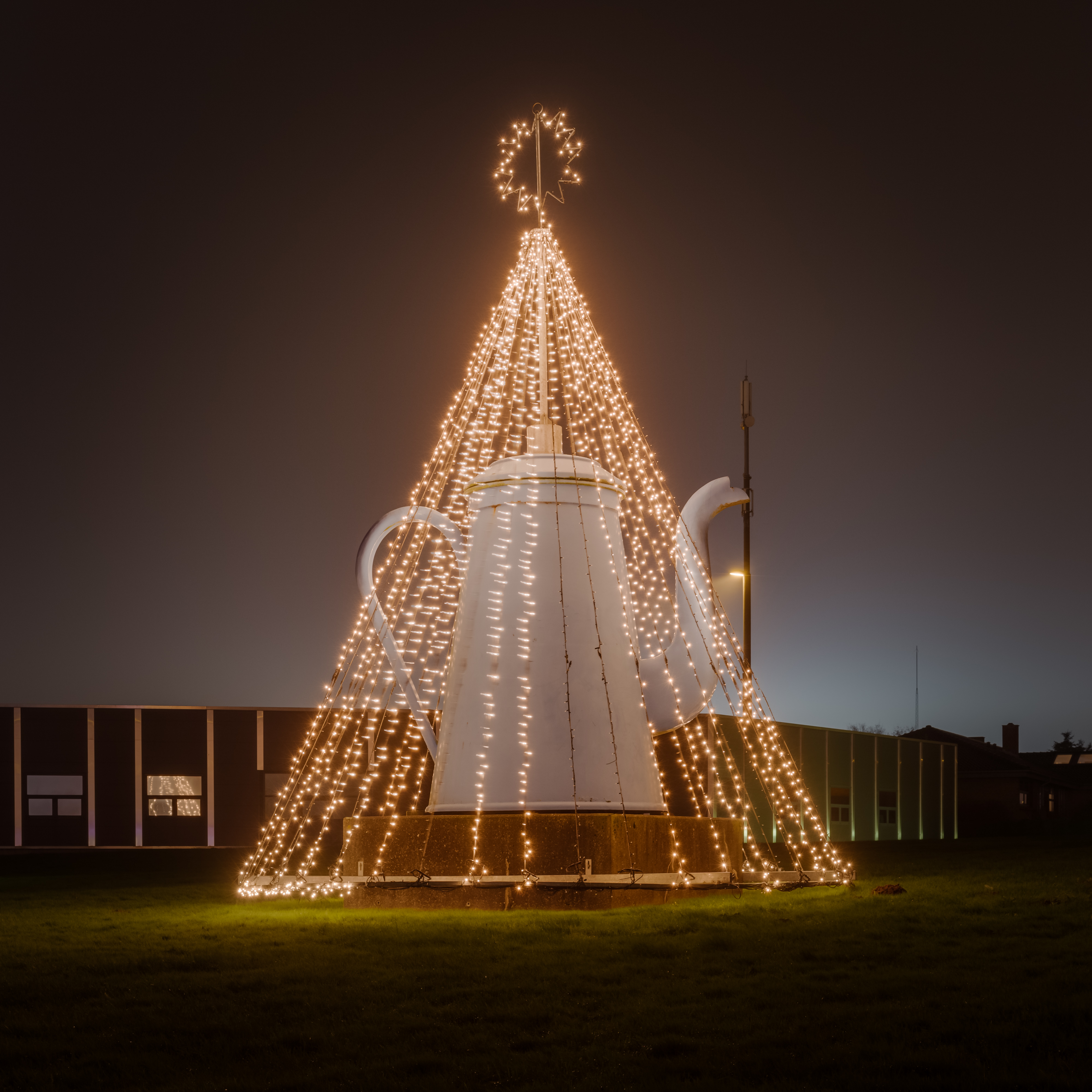
Peter Larsen illuminated coffee pot

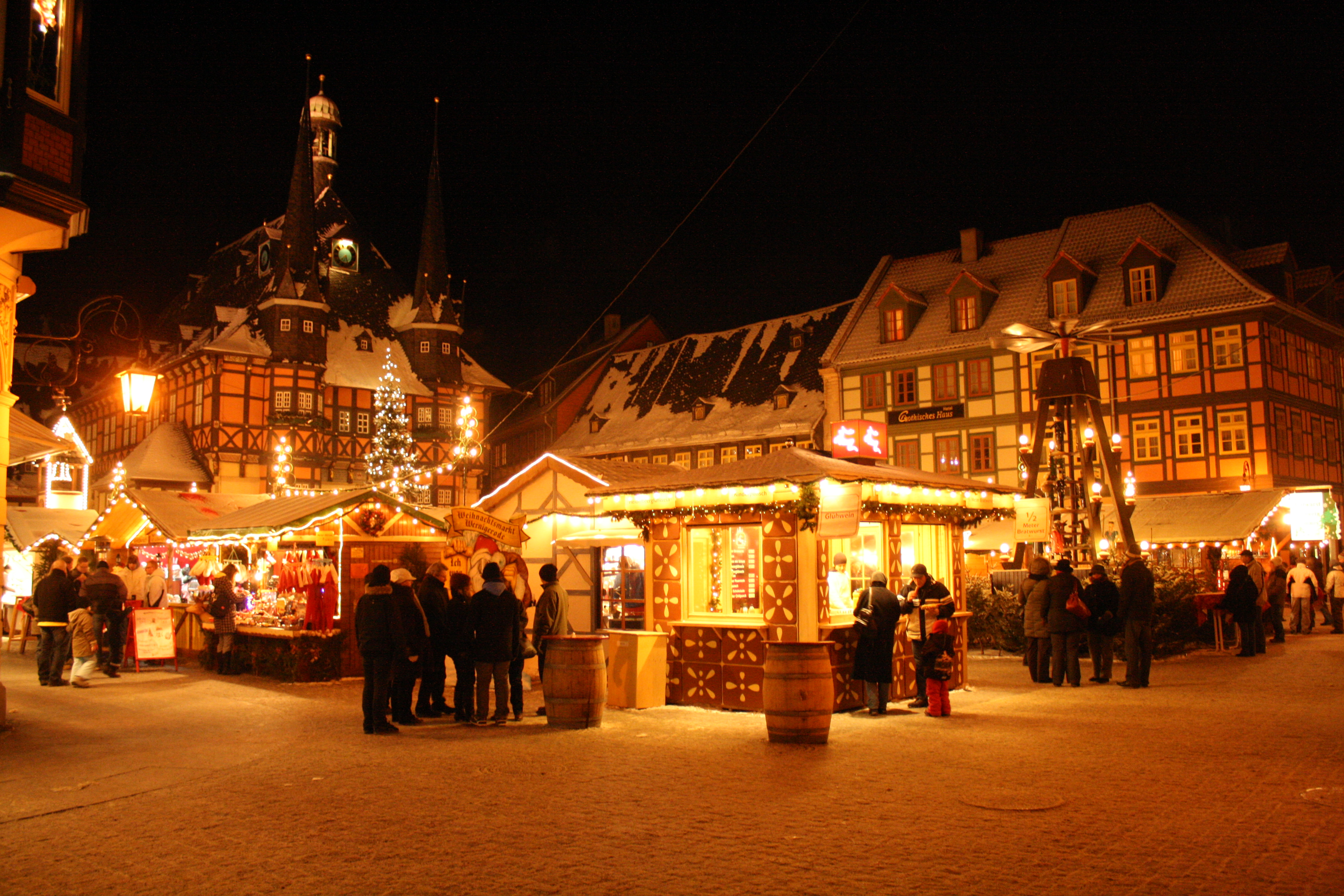
Christmas market illumination

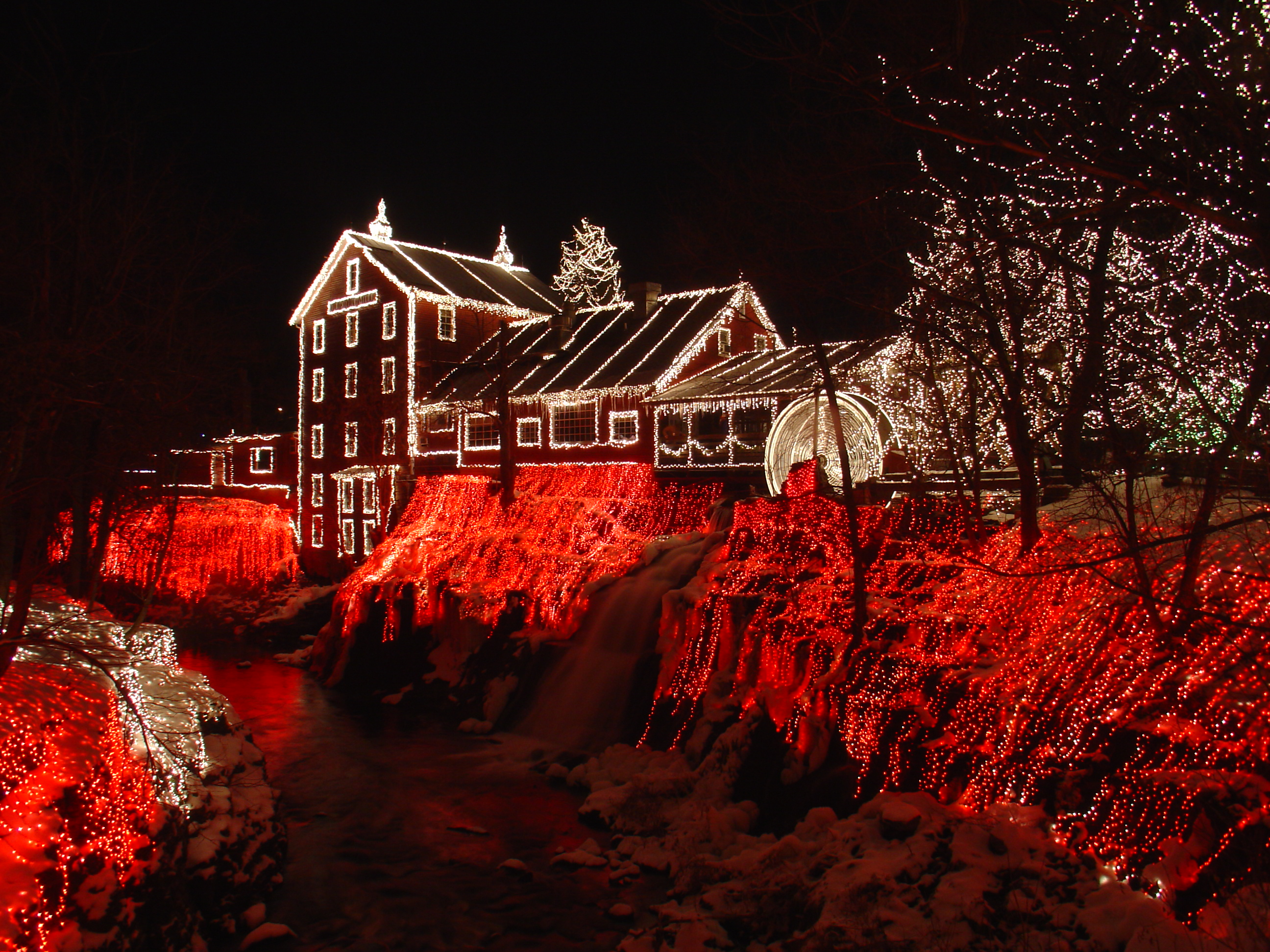
Clifton Mill Christmas in 2005

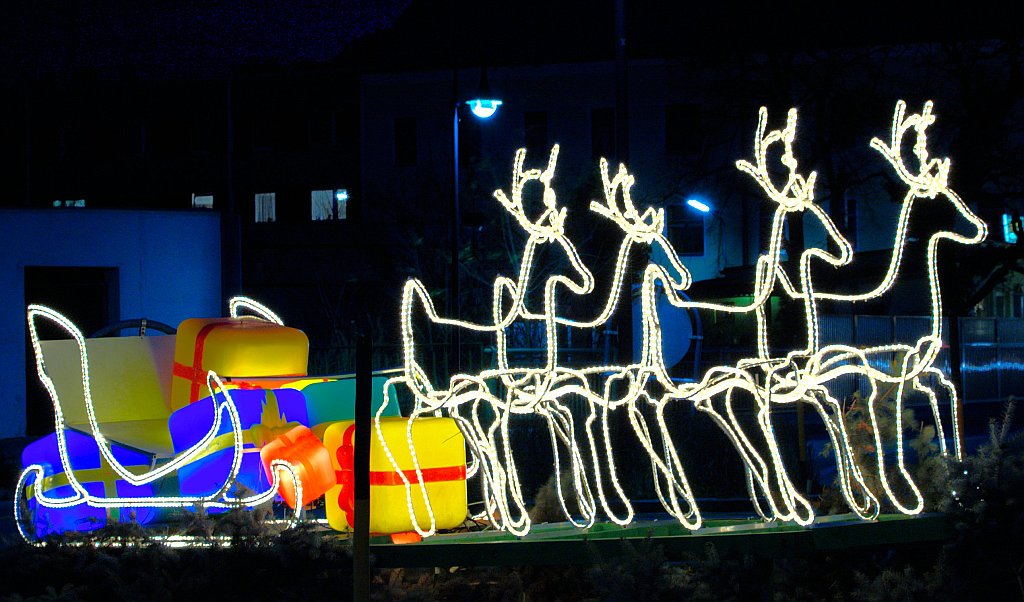
LED light sculpture in Gänserndorf, Austria

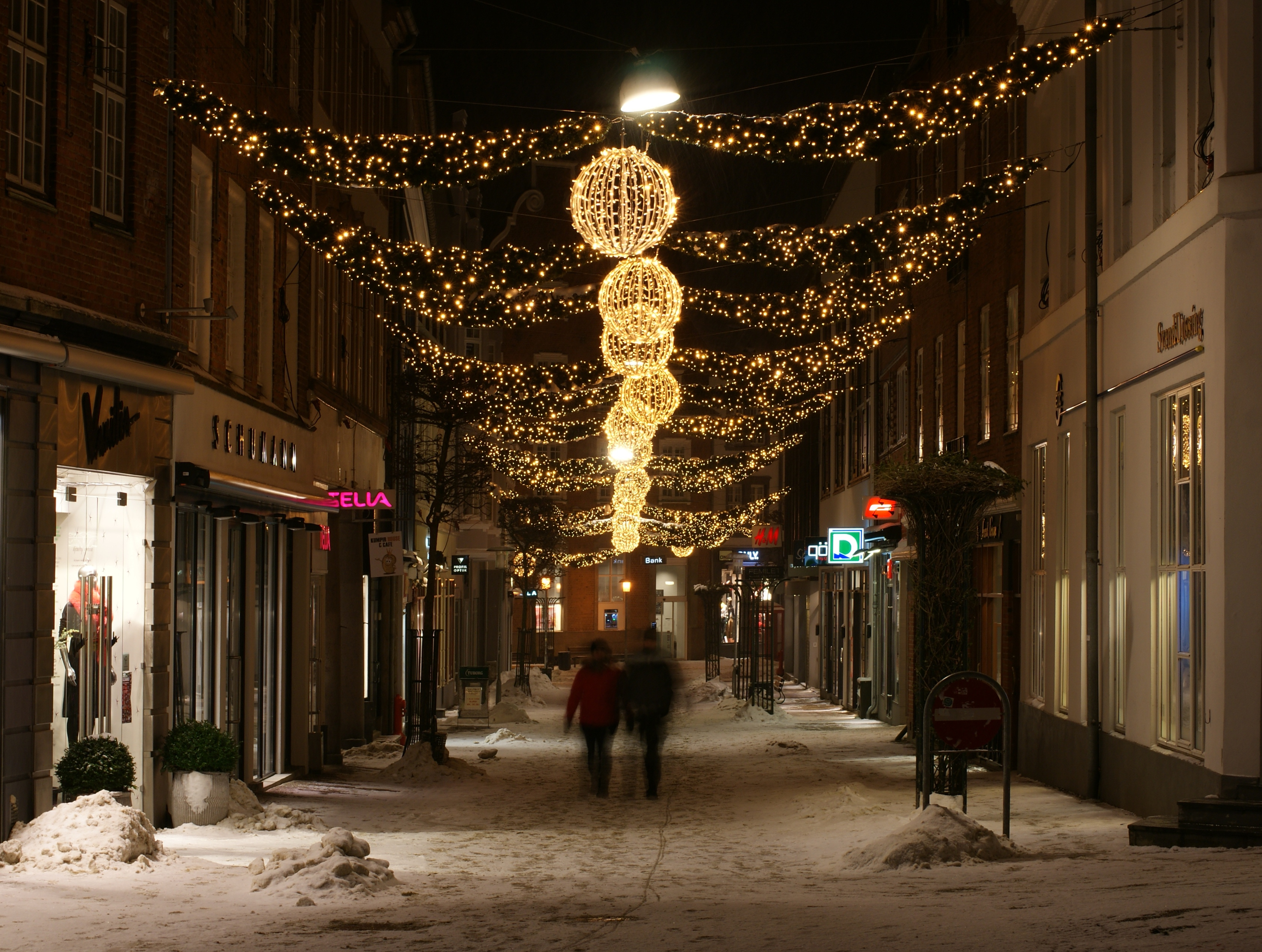
Christmas street illumination in Viborg

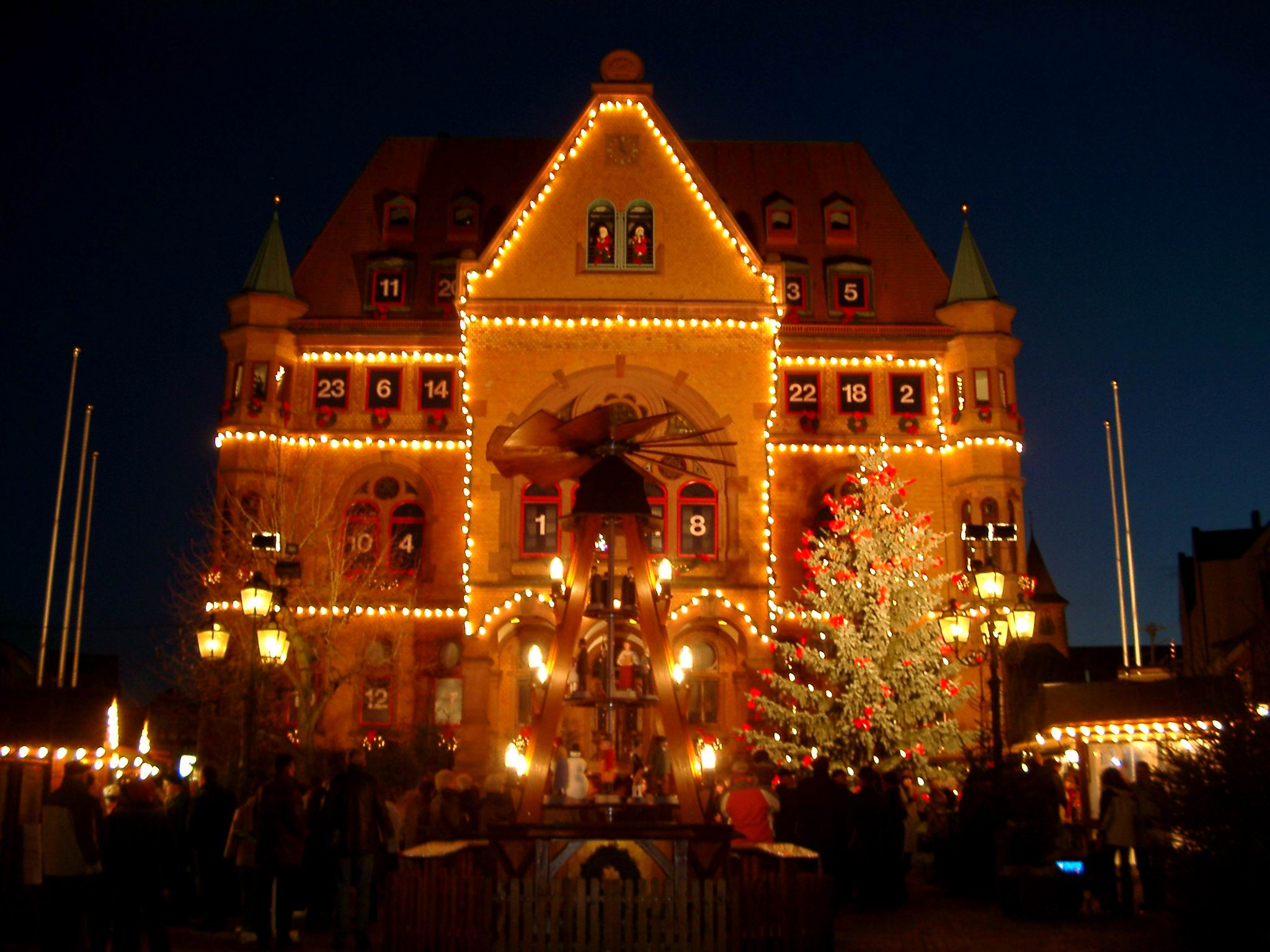
Hünfeld Adventskalender

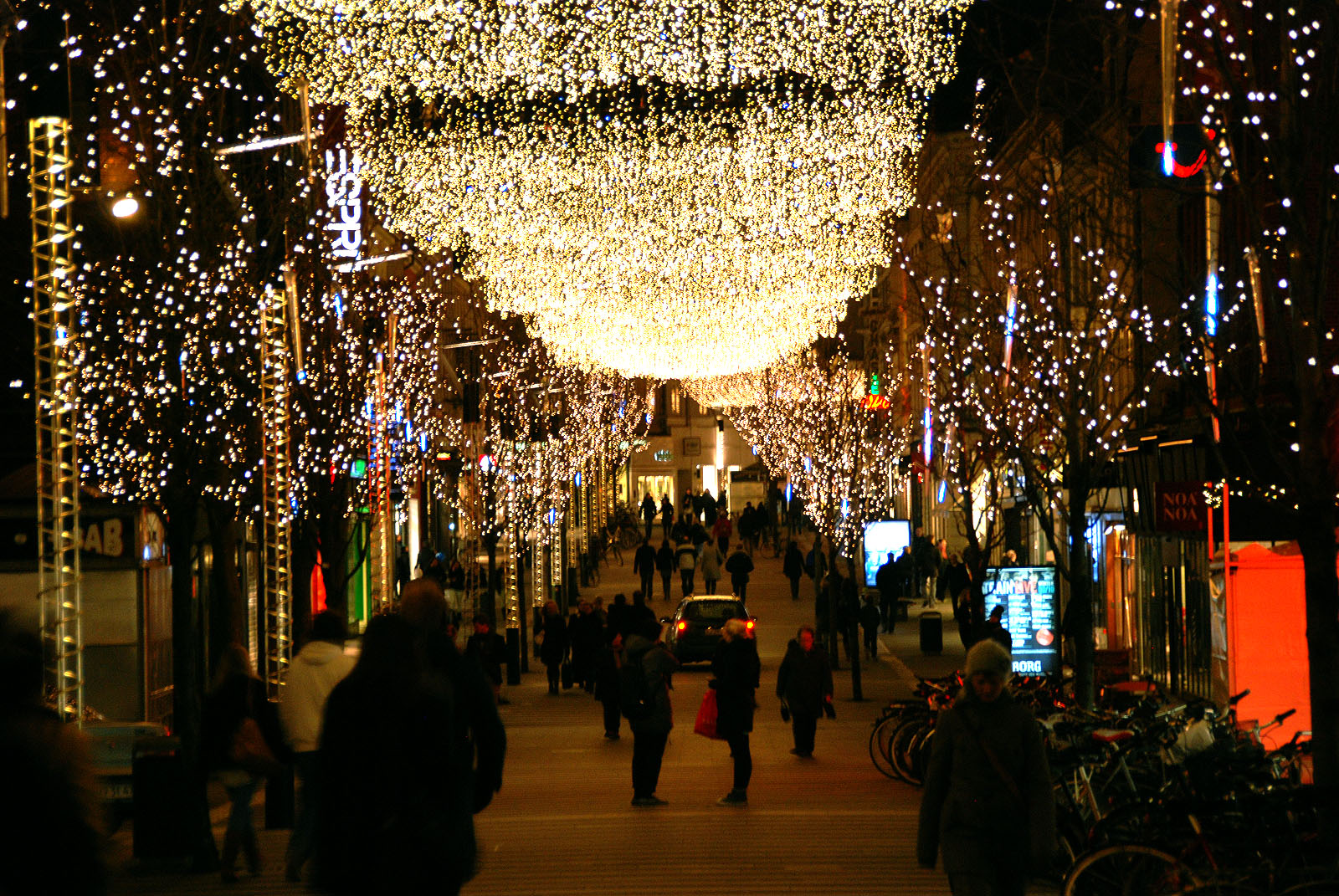
Christmas lights, Aarhus

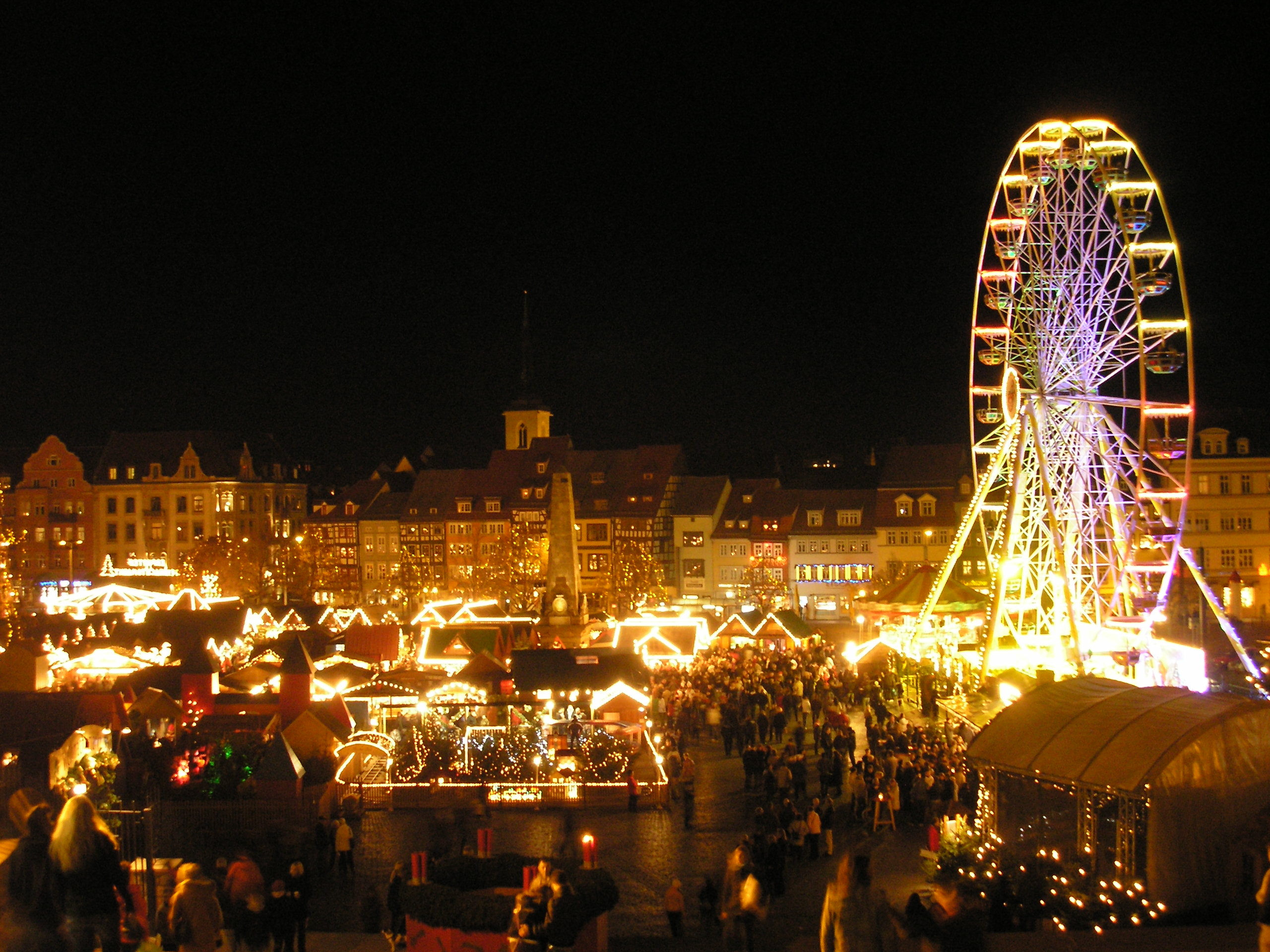
City lights, Christmastime

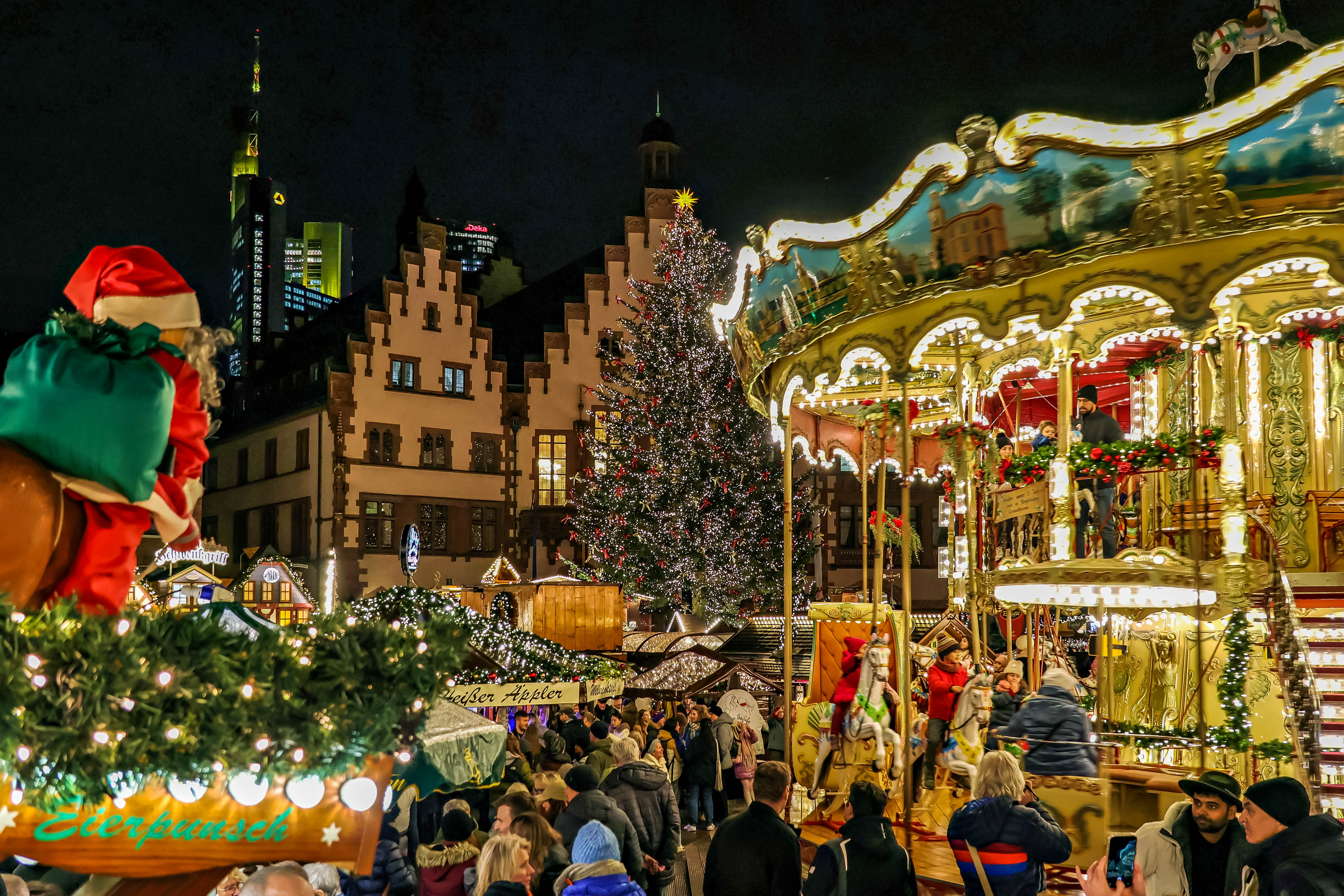
Christmas market in Frankfurt, Germany

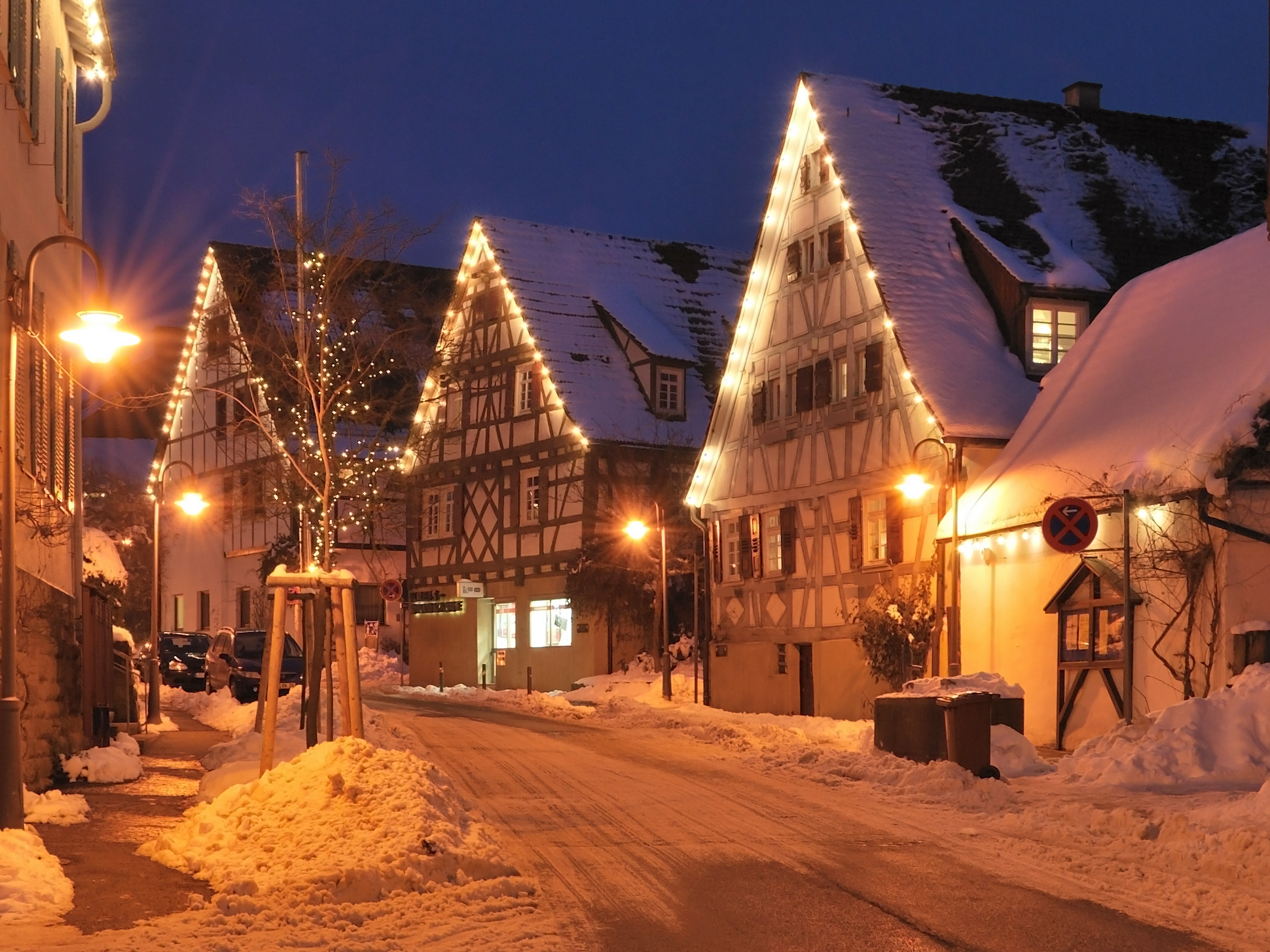
Lighted trees and houses in Schöckingen

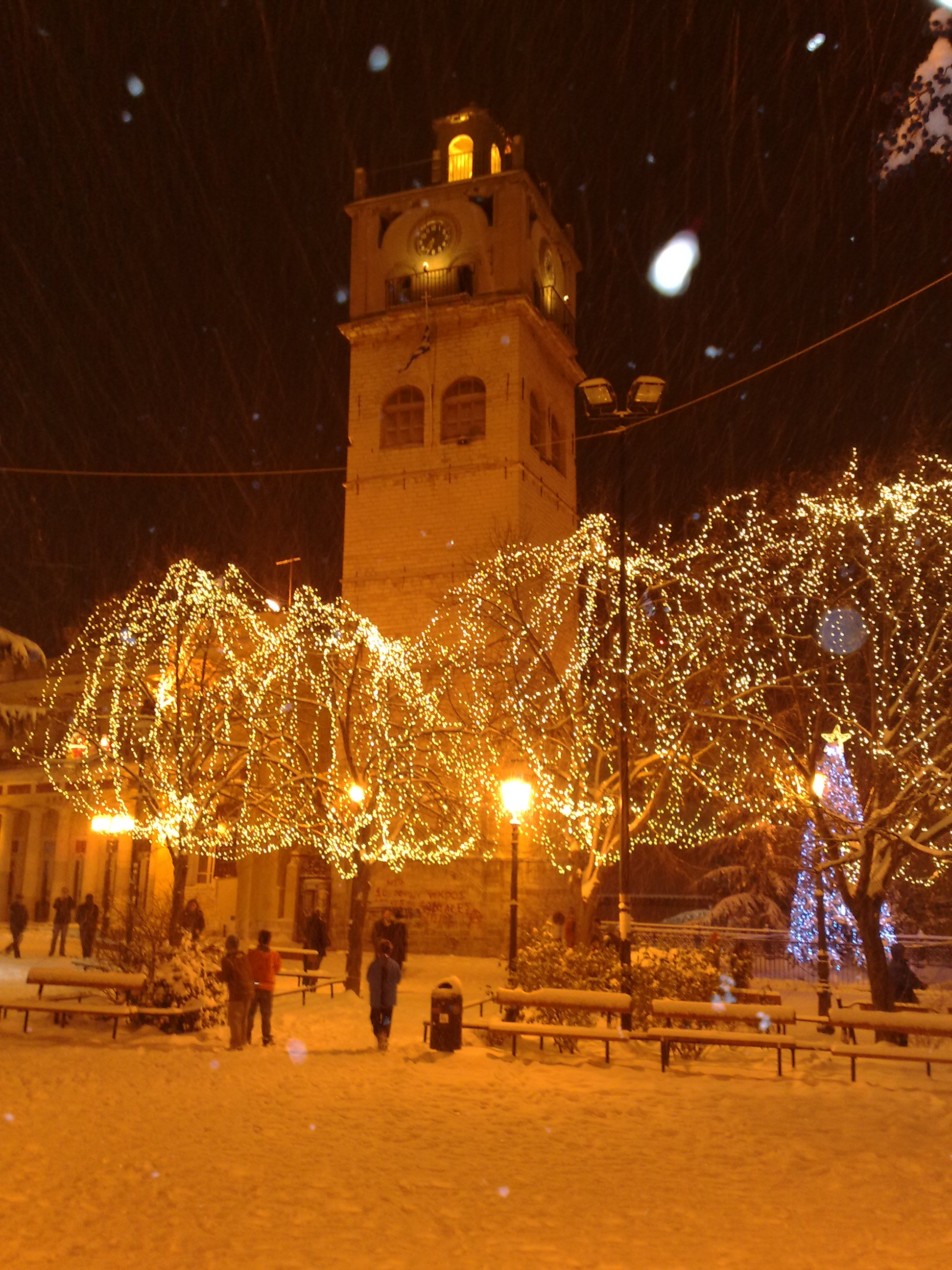
The clock tower of Kozani; a landmark of the city.

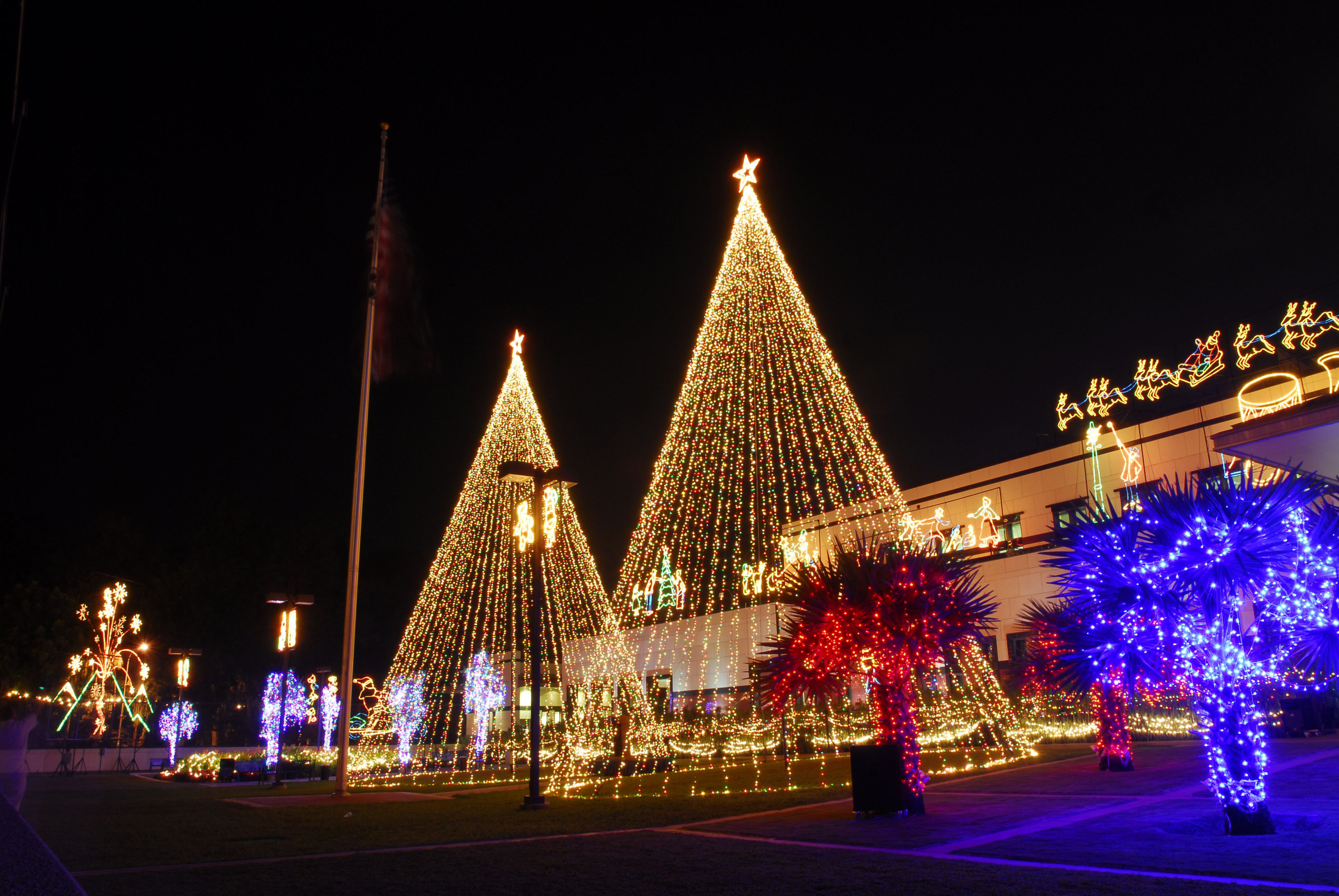
Essex Christmas lighting ceremony

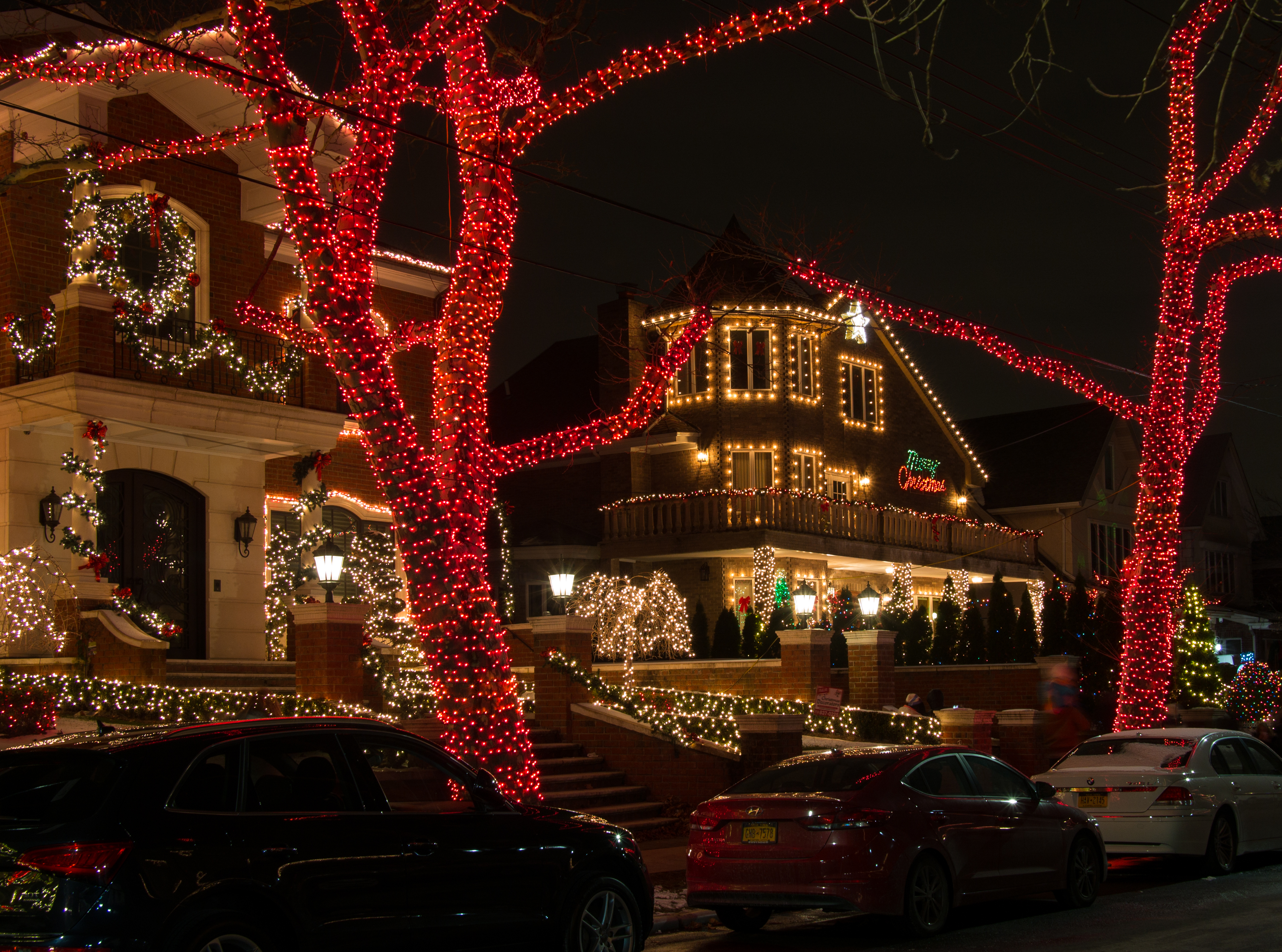
The Dyker Heights neighborhood (nicknamed "Dyker Lights" for its holiday lights displays) of Brooklyn, New York

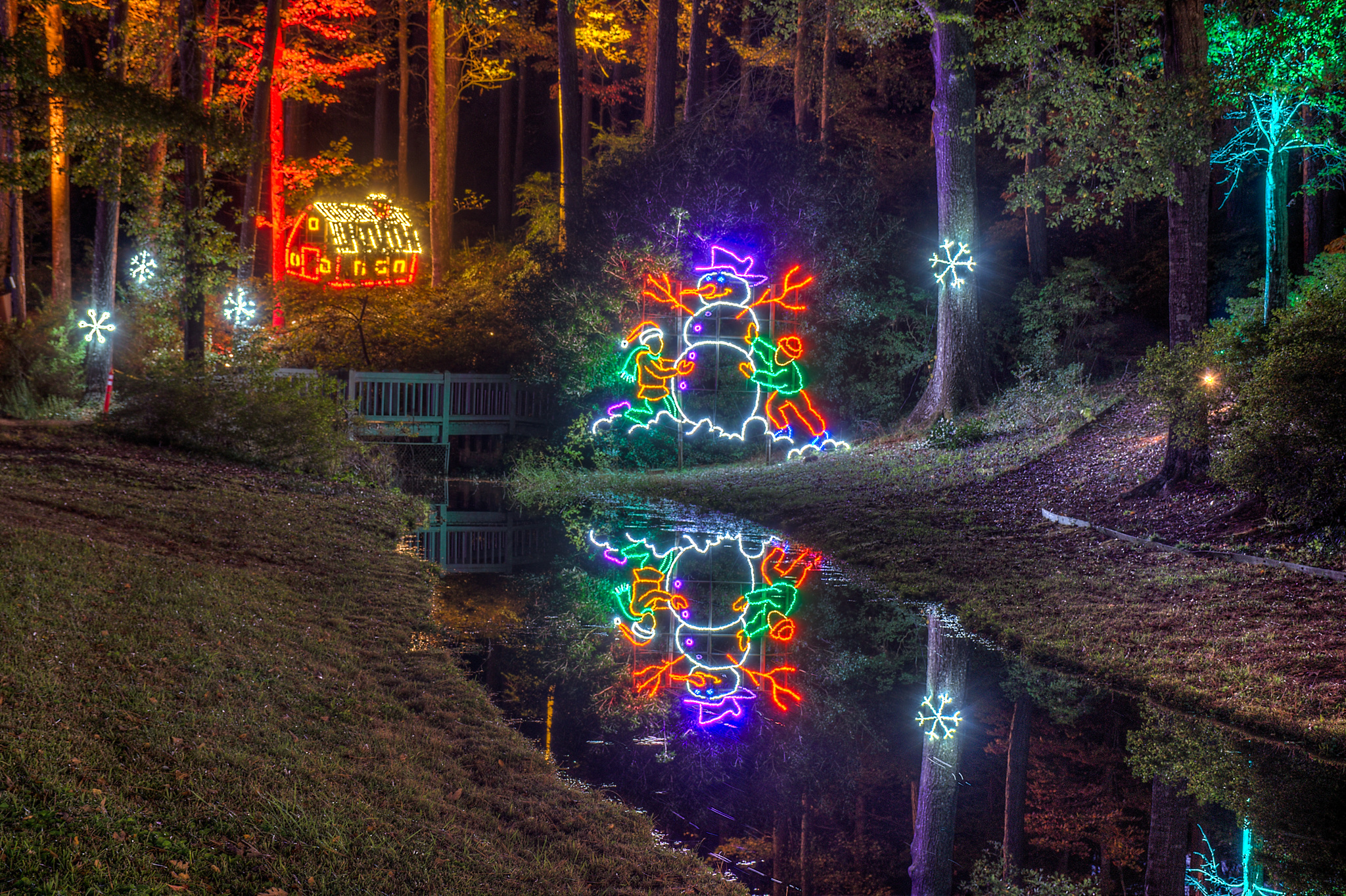
Fantasy in Lights at Callaway Gardens

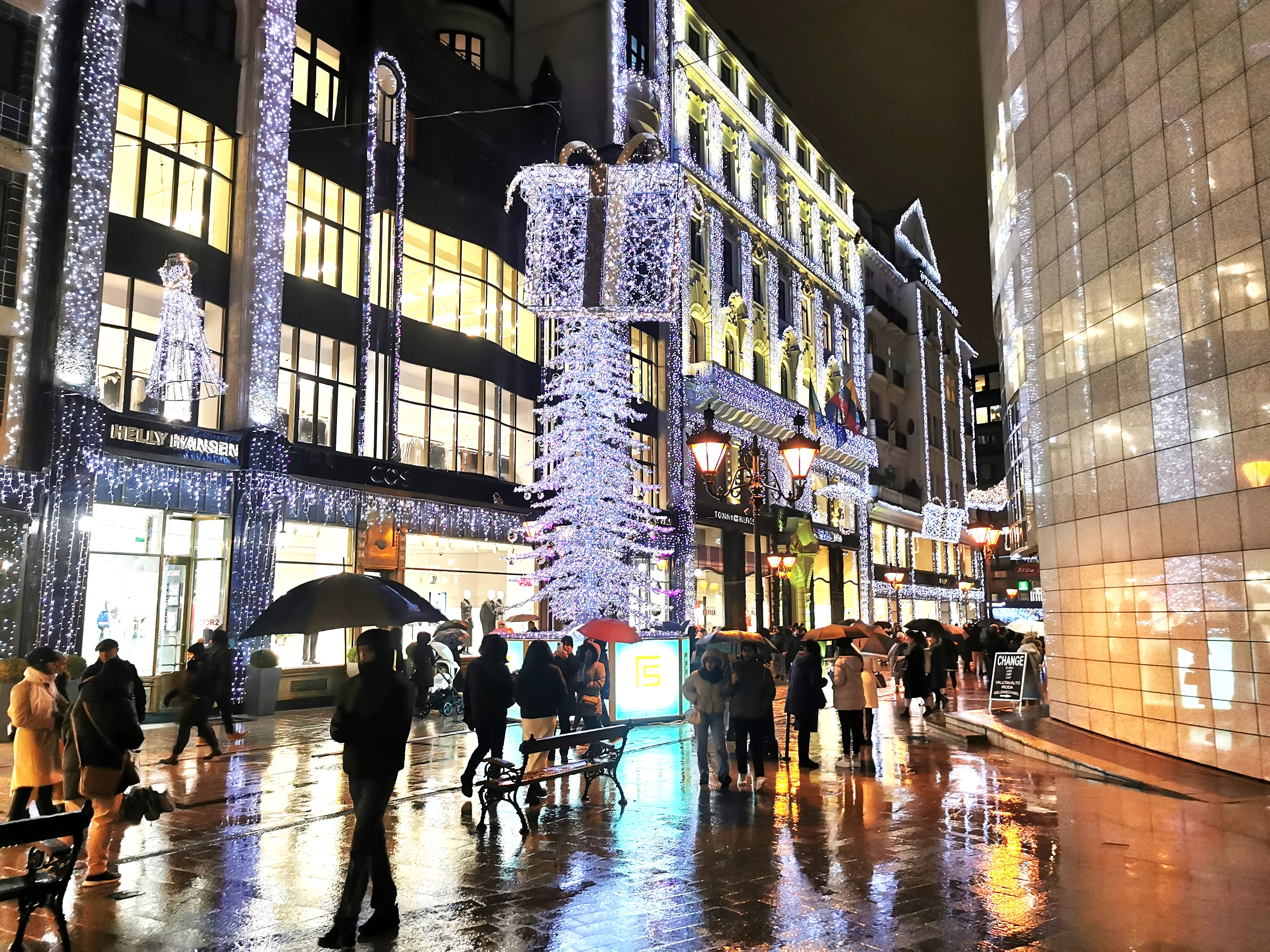
City lights, Budapest 2024

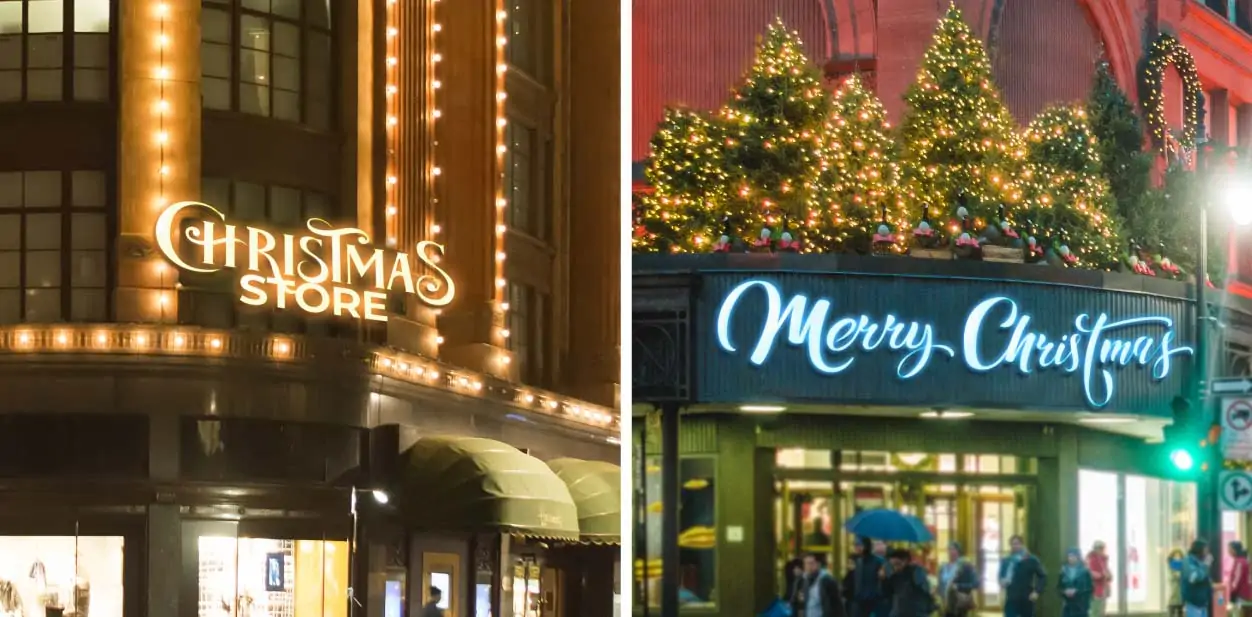
Facade lighted christmas signs

== See also ==
- Albert Sadacca
- Christmas tree
- Christmas worldwide
- Illumination
- Luminaria
- Parol
