= Edward Hibberd Johnson =

American inventor

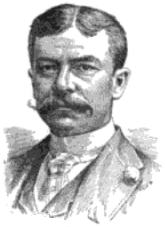
- Born: January 4, 1846; Chester County, Pennsylvania
- Died: September 9, 1917 (aged 71); New York, New York
- Occupation: Inventor
- Spouse: Margaret V. Kenney (m. 1873)
- Children: 3

Edward Hibberd Johnson (January 4, 1846 – September 9, 1917) was an inventor and business associate of American inventor Thomas Alva Edison. He was involved in many of Edison's projects, and was a partner in an early organization which evolved into General Electric. When Johnson was Vice President of the Edison Electric Light Company, a predecessor of General Electric, he created the first known electrically illuminated Christmas tree at his home in New York City in 1882. Edward H. Johnson became the Father of Electric Christmas Tree Lights.

== Biographical information ==
=== Early life ===
Edward Hibberd Johnson was born in Chester County, Pennsylvania on January 4, 1846. He was educated in public schools in Philadelphia, and worked as a telegraph operator.

=== Protégé of William Jackson Palmer ===
In 1867, William Jackson Palmer and Edward Hibberd Johnson headed west from their hometown of Philadelphia, Pennsylvania. General Palmer was the construction manager for the Kansas Pacific Railroad, mapping routes through New Mexico and Arizona to the Pacific coast.

The Kansas Pacific Railroad was an enterprise of the Philadelphia interests which controlled the Pennsylvania Railroad (whose president John Edgar Thomson had employed Palmer as his personal secretary before the War). Under General Palmer's direction the Kansas Pacific was extended from Kansas City, Missouri, reaching Denver, Colorado in August 1870.

=== Hiring young Thomas A. Edison ===
In 1871 Edward H. Johnson, as the assistant to General William J. Palmer, was sent back east to manage the Automatic Telegraph Company. Johnson hired Thomas A. Edison when Edison was 24. Of Edison, Johnson later wrote:

He ate at this desk and slept in a chair. In six weeks he had gone through the books, written a volume of abstracts, and made two thousand experiments ... and produced a solution.

— Edward H. Johnson

Johnson later was a prominent supporter of Edison, helping him establish his "invention factory" in Menlo Park, New Jersey. Johnson became one of Edison's trusted executives as his inventions and business developed in the 1870s and later.

He married Margaret V. Kenney in Philadelphia in 1873, and they had three children.

=== Recruiting Frank J. Sprague ===
In 1883, Johnson is also credited with recruiting into Edison's organization naval officer Frank J. Sprague, whom he met at an international electrical exposition. Sprague became a well known inventor, and was responsible for major developments in electric railways and electric elevators which were instrumental in the growth of US cities in the later 19th and early 20th centuries.

=== Death ===
Edward Hibberd Johnson died at his home in New York on September 9, 1917.

== First electric Christmas tree lights ==
The first known electrically illuminated Christmas tree was the creation of Edward H. Johnson. While he was Vice-President of the Edison Electric Light Company, he had Christmas tree bulbs especially made for him. He displayed his Christmas tree—hand-wired with 80 red, white, and blue electric light bulbs the size of walnuts—in December 1882 at his home in New York City. The tree was set on a wooden box that rotated six times a minute and alternated turning the lights on and off. The story was reported in the Detroit Post and Tribune by a writer named William Augustus Croffut, who called it "a superb exhibition" and noted that "the fantastic tree itself with its starry fruit were kept going by the slight electric current brought from the main office on a filmy wire." Another description of the tree appeared the following month in Electrical World, which noted that it was located in Johnson's parlor at 56 West 12th Street in Greenwich Village.

In December 1883, Johnson decorated a 45-foot-high (14 m) revolving Christmas tree with 225 red, white and blue electric light bulbs that was displayed at the Foreign Exhibition in Boston. Johnson had also planned to light a Christmas tree at his home that year, but did not receive a gas engine needed to create an isolated lighting plant for his residence, which was then located at 139 East 36th Street in Murray Hill. The following year, a dynamo located in the cellar of his home on East 36th Street was used to supply the power for the 120 lights on his Christmas tree, which revolved and displayed different combinations of colored lights using a special mechanism he had patented. Edward H. Johnson became known as the Father of Electric Christmas Tree Lights.

From that point on, electrically illuminated Christmas trees, indoors and outdoors, grew with mounting enthusiasm in the United States and elsewhere. In 1895, U.S. President Grover Cleveland sponsored the first electrically lit Christmas tree in the White House. It had more than a hundred multicoloured lights. The first commercially produced Christmas tree lamps were manufactured in strings of nine sockets by the Edison General Electric Company of Harrison, New Jersey and advertised in the December 1901 issue of the Ladies' Home Journal. Each socket took a miniature two-candela carbon-filament lamp.
