= Greece's Next Top Model season 1 =

Greece's Next Top Model
- Season 1
- Judges: Vicky Kaya; Angelos Bratis; Iliana Papageorgiou; Dimitris Skoulos
- No. of contestants: 22
- Winner: Noune Kazaryan
- No. of episodes: 28

Release
- Original network: Star Channel
- Original release: September 10 – December 19, 2018

Season chronology
- Next → Season 2

The first season of Greece's Next Top Model (abbreviated as GNTMgr) premiered on September 10, 2018 on Star Channel.

Vicky Kaya returned as the host of the show, while the judging panel consisted of model Iliana Papageorgiou, fashion designer Angelos Bratis and noted photographer Dimitris Skoulos.

The prizes for this season included a modelling contract with PLACE models in Hamburg, a cover and spread with InStyle magazine, a contract with Dust & Cream cosmetics, and a cash prize of €50,000.

Approximately 3,000 girls applied for the show. Of which 1,500 girls were invited to the audition rounds. 50 girls were then selected to enter the Bootcamp. Originally, 25 girls were chosen to be contestants in this season. However, one girl decided to quit before the first photoshoot took place, and two others were eliminated right before entering the model house, narrowing down the final number of contestants to 22.

The winner of the competition was 21-year old Eirini Noune Kazaryan.

== Cast ==
=== Contestants ===
(Ages stated are at start of contest)

Contestant	Age	Height	Hometown	Finish	Place
Sofia Zachariadou	23	1.72 m (5 ft 7 1/2 in)	Thessaloniki	Episode 9	22
Ioanna Desylla	19	1.79 m (5 ft 10 1/2 in)	Athens	Episode 9	21
Katerina Visseri	24	1.76 m (5 ft 9 1/2 in)	Serres	Episode 12	20
Marianna Mantesi	18	1.80 m (5 ft 11 in)	Athens	Episode 14	19
Garifallia Kalifoni	22	1.72 m (5 ft 7 1/2 in)	Agrinio	Episode 15	18 (quit)
Elena Kalliontzi	21	1.75 m (5 ft 9 in)	Heraklion	Episode 15	17
Meggy Ndrio	25	1.76 m (5 ft 9 1/2 in)	Thessaloniki	Episode 16	16
Rozana Koutsoukou	21	1.67 m (5 ft 5 1/2 in)	Mykonos	Episode 17	15
Eirini Sterianou	23	1.72 m (5 ft 7 1/2 in)	Lesbos	Episode 18	14
Ioanna Sarri	21	1.79 m (5 ft 10 1/2 in)	Athens	Episode 19	13
Christianna Skoura	22	1.76 m (5 ft 9 1/2 in)	Heraklion	Episode 21	12
Xanthi Jerefou	20	1.71 m (5 ft 7 1/2 in)	Pireaus	Episode 22	11 (quit)
Agapi Olagbegi	20	1.78 m (5 ft 10 in)	Athens	Episode 22	10
Mikaela Fotiadis	24	1.78 m (5 ft 10 in)	Athens	Episode 23	9
Anna Tsakouridou	24	1.73 m (5 ft 8 in)	Larissa	Episode 24	8
Eirini Ermidou	19	1.85 m (6 ft 1 in)	Komotini	Episode 25	7-6
Elda Laska	22	1.76 m (5 ft 9 1/2 in)	Heraklion	Episode 25	7-6
Evi Ioannidou	23	1.80 m (5 ft 11 in)	Veroia	Episode 26	5
Anna Amanatidou	21	1.68 m (5 ft 6 in)	Thessaloniki	Episode 27	4
Marianna Painesi	24	1.72 m (5 ft 7 1/2 in)	Athens	Episode 28	3
Evelina Skichko	20	1.77 m (5 ft 9 1/2 in)	Nicosia	Episode 28	2
Noune Kazaryan	21	1.76 m (5 ft 9 1/2 in)	Athens	Episode 28	1

=== Judges ===
- Vicky Kaya
- Angelos Bratis
- Iliana Papageorgiou
- Dimitris Skoulos

=== Other cast members ===
- Elena Christopoulou – mentor
- Genevieve Majari – art director

== Episode summaries ==
=== Episodes 1–5: Auditions ===
The show kicked off with the audition phase. Auditions took place in three different cities: Athens, Thessaloniki and Heraklion. The auditions aired for the first five episodes of the show. During the auditions, the girls had a brief interview with the judges while they also walked in swimwear, if asked. In order to advance, they needed a "yes" from at least 3 of the judges.

=== Episodes 6–7: Bootcamp ===
During the bootcamp, the 70 girls that advanced from the auditions took part. The bootcamp took place in Lake Vouliagmeni and was divided in two parts; during the first part the girls had to pick a visor or a turban and pose for a photoshoot in their swimwear. Based on the photoshoot, 40 of the girls advanced to the second part of the bootcamp. For the second part of the bootcamp, the girls had to walk in a fashion runway for the Greek fashion designer Vassilis Zoulias. Based on the runway, 25 of the girls advanced to the house.

- Featured photographer: Bill Georgoussis

=== Episode 8: Polaroid & Sparkly In a Bathtub ===
Original airdate: October 15, 2018

- Quit: Angelina Georgiou
- Eliminated: Gina Chaniotaki and Vasiliki Karra
- Top 3: Eirini Sterianou, Evi Ioannidou and Sofia Zachariadou
- Best Photo: Sofia Zachariadou
- Featured photographers: Vasilis Topouslidis, Akis Paraskevopoulos

=== Episode 9: Underwater Orchids ===
Original airdate: October 16, 2018

- Eliminated outside of judging panel: Sofia Zachariadou
- First call-out: Anna Amanatidou
- Bottom two: Ioanna Desylla & Eirini Noune Kazaryan
- Eliminated: Ioanna Desylla
- Featured photographer: Katerina Tsatsani

=== Episode 10: The Makeover ===
Original airdate: October 22, 2018

=== Episode 11: Embrace Your New Look ===
Original airdate: October 23, 2018

- First call-out: Evelina Skichko
- Bottom two: Agapi Olagbegi & Katerina Visseri
- Eliminated: Agapi Olagbegi
- Featured photographer: Thanassis Krikis

=== Episode 12: Africa ===
Original airdate: October 29, 2018

- First call-out: Garifallia Kalifoni
- Bottom two: Elda Laska & Katerina Visseri
- Eliminated: Katerina Visseri
- Featured photographer: Genevieve Majari

=== Episode 13: Urban Superheroes ===
Original airdate: October 30, 2018

- First call-out: Elena Kalliontzi
- Bottom two: Eirini Sterianou & Elda Laska
- Eliminated: Elda Laska
- Featured photographer: George Malekakis

=== Episode 14: Awareness ===
Original airdate: November 5, 2018

- First call-out: Mikaela Fotiadis
- Bottom two: Eirini Ermidou & Marianna Mantesi
- Eliminated: Marianna Mantesi
- Featured photographer: Ioanna Ηadjiandreou

=== Episode 15: Boys & Girls ===
Original airdate: November 6, 2018

- Quit: Garifallia Kalifoni
- First call-out: Evi Ioannidou
- Bottom two: Elena Kalliontzi & Eirini Noune Kazarian
- Eliminated: Elena Kalliontzi
- Featured photographer: Freddie F

=== Episode 16: Runaway Bride ===
Original airdate: November 12, 2018

- First call-out: Evelina Skichko & Eirini Ermidou
- Bottom two: Meggy Ndrio & Rozana Koutsoukou
- Eliminated: Meggy Ndrio
- Featured photographer: Apostolis Koukousas

=== Episode 17: Balance ===
Original airdate: November 13, 2018

- First call-out: Marianna Painesi
- Bottom two: Rozana Koutsoukou & Xanthi Tzerefou
- Eliminated: Rozana Koutsoukou
- Featured photographer: Aggelos Potamianos

=== Episode 18: Styling on a Rush ===
Original airdate: November 19, 2018

- First call-out: Evi Ioannidou
- Bottom two: Ioanna Sarri & Eirini Sterianou
- Eliminated: Eirini Sterianou
- Featured photographer: Nikos Mastoras

=== Episode 19: Captivating Animals ===
Original airdate: November 20, 2018

- First call-out: Eirini Noune Kazaryan
- Bottom two: Anna Amanatidou & Ioanna Sarri
- Eliminated: Ioanna Sarri
- Featured photographer: Panos Giannakopoulos

=== Episode 20: Extreme Masterchef ===
Original airdate: November 26, 2018

- First call-out: Eirini Noune Kazaryan
- Bottom two: Mikaela Fotiadi & Anna Tsakouridou
- Eliminated: Anna Tsakouridou
- Featured photographer: Stefanos Papadopoulos

=== Episode 21: Colours of Motherhood ===
Original airdate: November 27, 2018

- First call-out: Anna Amanatidou
- Bottom two: Christianna Skoura & Eirini Noune Kazaryan
- Eliminated: Christianna Skoura
- Featured photographer: George Aggelis

=== Episode 22: Dolls ===
Original airdate: December 3, 2018

- Quit: Xanthi Tzerefou
- Returned: Agapi Olagbegi, Anna Tsakouridou & Elda Laska
- First call-out: Elda Laska
- Bottom two: Agapi Olagbegi & Mikaela Fotiadi
- Eliminated: Agapi Olagbegi
- Featured photographer: Vasilis Topouslidis

=== Episode 23: Speed ===
Original airdate: December 4, 2018

- Immune: Marianna Painesi
- First call-out: Evelina Skichko
- Bottom two: Mikaela Fotiadi & Evi Ioannidou
- Eliminated: Mikaela Fotiadi
- Featured photographer: Marios Gavoyiannis

=== Episode 24: Androgynous ===
Original airdate: December 10, 2018

- First call-out: Marianna Painesi
- Bottom two: Anna Tsakouridou & Anna Amanatidou
- Eliminated: Anna Tsakouridou
- Featured photographer: Kosmas Koumianos

=== Episode 25: Video Clip ===
Original airdate: December 11, 2018

- First call-out: Anna Amanatidou
- Bottom two: Elda Laska & Eirini Ermidou
- Eliminated: Both

=== Episode 26: Crystal Ball Magic ===
Original airdate: December 17, 2018

- First call-out: Eirini Noune Kazaryan
- Bottom two: Anna Amanatidou & Evi Ioannidou
- Eliminated: Evi Ioannidou
- Featured photographer: Bill Georgoussis

=== Episode 27: Winter Dynasty ===
Original airdate: December 18, 2018

- First call-out: Evelina Skichko
- Bottom two: Anna Amanatidou & Marianna Painesi
- Eliminated: Anna Amanatidou
- Featured photographer: Marina Vernicos

=== Episode 28: Xmas Fashion Party - Final ===
Original airdate: December 19, 2018

Scores
Nº	Model	Judges' scores						Public Vote Average	Total Score
Nº	Model	#	Vicky	Angelos	Iliana	Dimitris	Total	Public Vote Average	Total Score
1	Noune	Photo 1	10	9	10	10	39	7	162
1	Noune	Photo 2	10	10	10	10	40	7	162
1	Noune	Photo 3	9	10	9	9	37	7	162
1	Noune	Ad Video	10	10	10	9	39	7	162
2	Evelina	Photo 1	9	10	9	9	37	6	154
2	Evelina	Photo 2	9	10	9	9	37	6	154
2	Evelina	Photo 3	10	10	9	10	39	6	154
2	Evelina	Ad Video	9	9	8	9	35	6	154
3	Marianna P.	Photo 1	8	8	8	9	33	7	149
3	Marianna P.	Photo 2	9	9	9	9	36	7	149
3	Marianna P.	Photo 3	10	10	10	10	40	7	149
3	Marianna P.	Ad Video	9	8	8	8	33	7	149

- Final three: Evelina Skichko, Eirini Noune Kazaryan & Marianna Painesi
- Runner-up: Evelina Skichko
- Greece's Next Top Model: Eirini Noune Kazaryan
- Featured Photographer: Dimitris Skoulos

== Results ==
Order	Episodes																		
Order	9 (Note: In episode 9, Sofia was eliminated outside of judging panel for failing to pose under water at the photo shoot.)	11	12	13	14	15 (Note: In episode 15, Garifallia decided to quit the competition at panel.)	16 (Note: In episode 16, Evelina & Eirini E. shared the first call-out.)	17	18	19	20	21	22 (Note: In episode 22, Agapi, Anna T. & Elda returned to the competition. Furthermore, Xanthi had to quit because of medical reasons.)	23 (Note: In episode 23, Marianna P. was immune from elimination for winning the challenge. Evelina had the best photo of the week.)	24	25	26	27	28
1	Anna A.	Evelina	Garifallia	Elena	Mikaela	Evi	Evelina; Eirini E.	Marianna P.	Evi	Noune	Noune	Anna A.	Elda	Marianna P.	Marianna P.	Anna A.	Noune	Evelina	Noune
2	Christianna	Xanthi	Marianna P.	Anna T.	Evelina	Meggy	Evelina; Eirini E.	Noune	Marianna P.	Xanthi	Anna A.	Evelina	Anna T.	Evelina	Noune	Evelina	Marianna P.	Noune	Evelina
3	Marianna P.	Marianna P.	Meggy	Eirini E.	Evi	Mikaela	Eirini S.	Eirini E.	Eirini E.	Mikaela	Evi	Marianna P.	Anna A.	Anna A.	Evelina	Noune	Evelina	Marianna P.	Marianna P.
4	Elda	Elena	Eirini E.	Mikaela	Meggy	Garifallia	Mikaela	Eirini S.	Noune	Evi	Marianna P.	Eirini E.	Marianna P.	Elda	Elda	Marianna P.	Anna A.	Anna A.	
5	Ioanna S.	Anna T.	Anna A.	Evelina	Eirini S.	Ioanna S.	Anna A.	Christianna	Anna T.	Marianna P.	Christianna	Evi	Noune	Noune	Evi	Evi	Evi		
6	Evelina	Rozana	Mikaela	Marianna P.	Ioanna S.	Eirini E.	Noune	Anna T.	Anna A.	Eirini E.	Evelina	Mikaela	Evelina	Anna T.	Eirini E.	Elda; Eirini E.			
7	Evi	Marianna M.	Evelina	Ioanna S.	Garifallia	Eirini S.	Evi	Evi	Evelina	Evelina	Xanthi	Xanthi	Eirini E.	Eirini E.	Anna A.	Elda; Eirini E.			
8	Anna T.	Meggy	Christianna	Xanthi	Elena	Evelina	Anna T.	Ioanna S.	Xanthi	Anna T.	Eirini E.	Noune	Evi	Evi	Anna T.				
9	Eirini E.	Christianna	Noune	Rozana	Rozana	Anna T.	Christianna	Evelina	Mikaela	Christianna	Mikaela	Christianna	Mikaela	Mikaela					
10	Xanthi	Mikaela	Rozana	Meggy	Noune	Christianna	Ioanna S.	Anna A.	Christianna	Anna A.	Anna T.		Agapi						
11	Rozana	Eirini S.	Xanthi	Evi	Anna A.	Marianna P.	Marianna P.	Mikaela	Ioanna S.	Ioanna S.			Xanthi						
12	Eirini S.	Anna A.	Elena	Christianna	Anna T.	Xanthi	Xanthi	Xanthi	Eirini S.										
13	Marianna M.	Elda	Anna T.	Garifallia	Marianna P.	Rozana	Rozana	Rozana											
14	Elena	Garifallia	Evi	Anna A.	Christianna	Anna A.	Meggy												
15	Katerina	Eirini E.	Ioanna S.	Noune	Xanthi	Noune													
16	Garifallia	Noune	Eirini S.	Marianna M.	Eirini E.	Elena													
17	Mikaela	Ioanna S.	Marianna M.	Eirini S.	Marianna M.														
18	Meggy	Evi	Elda	Elda															
19	Agapi	Katerina	Katerina																
20	Noune	Agapi																	
21	Ioanna D.																		
22	Sofia																		

The contestant was eliminated outside of judging panel
The contestant was eliminated
The contestant was immune from elimination
The contestant quit the competition
The contestant won the competition

=== Bottom two ===
Episode	Contestants	Eliminated
9	Noune & Ioanna D.	Sofia
9	Noune & Ioanna D.	Ioanna D.
11	Agapi & Karerina	Agapi
12	Elda & Katerina	Katerina
13	Elda & Eirini S.	Elda
14	Eirini E. & Marianna M.	Marianna M.
15	Elena & Noune	Garifallia
15	Elena & Noune	Elena
16	Meggy & Rozana	Meggy
17	Rozana & Xanthi	Rozana
18	Eirini S. & Ioanna S.	Eirini S.
19	Anna A. & Ioanna S.	Ioanna S.
20	Anna T. & Mikaela	Anna T.
21	Christianna & Noune	Christianna
22	Agapi & Mikaela	Xanthi
22	Agapi & Mikaela	Agapi
23	Evi & Mikaela	Mikaela
24	Anna A. & Anna T.	Anna T.
25	Eirini E. & Elda	Elda
25	Eirini E. & Elda	Eirini E.
26	Anna A. & Evi	Evi
27	Anna A. & Marianna P.	Anna A.
28	Evelina, Marianna P. & Noune	Marianna P.
28	Evelina, Marianna P. & Noune	Evelina

The contestant was eliminated outside of judging panel
The contestant quit the competition
The contestant was eliminated after her first time in the bottom two
The contestant was eliminated after her second time in the bottom two
The contestant was eliminated after her third time in the bottom two
The contestant was eliminated after her fourth time in the bottom two
The contestant was eliminated in the final judging and placed third
The contestant was eliminated in the final judging and placed as the runner-up

=== Average call-out order ===
Episode 28 is not included.

Rank by average	Place	Model	Call-out total	Number of call-outs	Call-out average
1	2	Evelina	78	18	4.33
2	3	Marianna P.	79	18	4.38
3	4	Anna A.	113	18	6.28
4	7	Eirini E.	104	16	6.50
5	5	Evi	112	17	6.58
6	1	Noune	125	18	6.94
7	9	Mikaela	101	14	7.21
8	8	Anna T.	102	14	7.29
9	16	Meggy	59	7	8.42
10-11	6	Elda	68	8	8.50
10-11	12	Christianna	102	12	8.50
12	11	Xanthi	106	12	8.83
13-14	17	Elena	55	6	9.17
13-14	18	Garifallia	55	6	9.17
15	13	Ioanna S.	95	10	9.50
16	14	Eirini S.	87	9	9.67
17	15	Rozana	84	8	10.50
18	19	Marianna M.	70	5	14.00
19	10	Agapi	49	3	16.33
20	20	Katerina	53	3	17.67
21	21	Ioanna D.	21	1	21.00
22	22	Sofia	22	1	22.00

== Ratings ==
No. in series	No. in season	Episode	Air date	Timeslot (EET)	Ratings	Viewers (in millions)	Rank		Share		Source
No. in series	No. in season	Episode	Air date	Timeslot (EET)	Ratings	Viewers (in millions)	Daily	Weekly	Household	Adults 18-54	Source
37	1	"Audition 1 in Athens"	September 10, 2018	Monday 9:00pm	5.6%	0.582	#2	#18	16.5%	19.8%	
38	2	"Audition 2 in Athens"	September 17, 2018	Monday 9:00pm	7.0%	0.726	#2	#5	18.2%	23.7%	
39	3	"Audition 3 in Thessaloniki"	September 24, 2018	Monday 9:00pm	7.6%	0.791	#2	#16	19.2%	25.0%	
40	4	"Audition 4 in Athens"	October 1, 2018	Monday 9:00pm	6.8%	0.701	#6	—N/a^{1}	16.0%	21.2%	
41	5	"Audition 5 in Heraklion"	October 2, 2018	Tuesday 9:00pm	5.7%	0.593	#8	—N/a^{1}	13.5%	18.6%	
42	6	"Bootcamp, Part 1"	October 8, 2018	Monday 9:00pm	7.0%	0.729	#6	—N/a^{1}	16.2%	22.6%	
43	7	"Bootcamp, Part 2"	October 9, 2018	Tuesday 9:00pm	6.6%	0.684	#8	—N/a^{1}	15.4%	22.9%	
44	8	"Polaroid & Sparkly in a bathtub"	October 15, 2018	Monday 9:00pm	6.5%	0.675	#9	—N/a^{1}	14.4%	20.1%	
45	9	"Underwater Orchids"	October 16, 2018	Tuesday 9:00pm	6.7%	0.698	#5	—N/a^{1}	15.4%	21.9%	
46	10	"The Makeover"	October 22, 2018	Monday 9:00pm	8.7%	0.905	#4	#13	19.7%	28.6%	
47	11	"Embrace your new look"	October 23, 2018	Tuesday 9:00pm	7.6%	0.787	#4	—N/a^{1}	17.5%	24.8%	
48	12	"Africa"	October 29, 2018	Monday 9:00pm	7.7%	0.796	#8	—N/a^{1}	18.0%	26.8%	
49	13	"Urban Superheroes"	October 30, 2018	Tuesday 9:00pm	6.8%	0.702	#8	—N/a^{1}	15.5%	21.3%	
50	14	"Awareness"	November 5, 2018	Monday 9:00pm	7.6%	0.793	#5	—N/a^{1}	17.3%	24.9%	
51	15	"Boys & Girls"	November 6, 2018	Tuesday 9:00pm	7.4%	0.769	#5	—N/a^{1}	17.1%	21.7%	
52	16	"Runaway Bride"	November 12, 2018	Monday 9:00pm	8.8%	0.912	#4	—N/a^{1}	19.7%	28.5%	
53	17	"Balance"	November 13, 2018	Tuesday 9:00pm	8.0%	0.828	#5	—N/a^{1}	18.0%	25.4%	
54	18	"Styling On A Rush"	November 19, 2018	Monday 9:00pm	7.6%	0.793	#7	—N/a^{1}	17.1%	26.1%	
55	19	"Captivating Animals"	November 20, 2018	Tuesday 9:00pm	—N/a^{2}			—N/a^{1}	15.5%	22.7%	
56	20	"Extreme MasterChef"	November 26, 2018	Monday 9:00pm	7.3%	0.791	#6	—N/a^{1}	17.5%	25.7%	
57	21	"Colours of Motherhood"	November 27, 2018	Tuesday 9:00pm	8.7%	0.907	#5	#20	19.9%	28.0%	
58	22	"Dolls"	December 3, 2018	Monday 9:00pm	8.0%	0.833	#5	—N/a^{1}	17.6%	26.3%	
59	23	"Speed"	December 4, 2018	Tuesday 9:00pm	7.9%	0.824	#6	—N/a^{1}	17.6%	29.9%	
60	24	"Androgynous"	December 10, 2018	Monday 9:00pm	7.6%	0.788	#7	—N/a^{1}	16.9%	27.0%	
61	25	"Video Clip"	December 11, 2018	Tuesday 9:00pm	7.9%	0.823	#8	—N/a^{1}	17.3%	23.5%	
62	26	"Crystal Ball Magic"	December 17, 2018	Monday 9:00pm	8.7%	0.903	#4	#18	19.9%	27.4%	
63	27	"Winter Dynasty"	December 18, 2018	Tuesday 9:00pm	9.2%	0.960	#3	#13	20.7%	28.0%	
64	28	"Xmas Fashion Party"	December 19, 2018	Wednesday 9:00pm	11.0%	1.142	#1	#3	28.1%	37.8%	

Note

1. Outside top 20.
2. Outside top 10.
