= Greece's Next Top Model season 3 =

Season of television series

Greece's Next Top Model
- Season 3
- Judges: Vicky Kaya; Angelos Bratis; Dimitris Skoulos; Genevieve Majari
- No. of contestants: 20
- Winner: Hercules Chuzinov
- No. of episodes: 30

Release
- Original network: Star Channel
- Original release: September 7 – December 15, 2020

Season chronology
- ← Previous; Season 2 Next → Season 4

The three season of Greece's Next Top Model (abbreviated as GNTMgr, also known as Greece's Next Top Model: Boys & Girls) premiered on September 7, 2020 on Star Channel. For the first time in Greece's Next Top Model, boys can also participate.

Vicky Kaya, Angelos Bratis & Dimitris Skoulos returned as judges, while Genevieve Majari replaced Iliana Papageorgiou as a judge, but she remained as an art director. Also, George Karavas replaced Elena Christopoulou as models' mentor.

The prizes for this season included a two-year modelling contract with Elite Model Management in London, a jewelry set from House of Jewels, a Mitsubishi Space Star and a cash prize of €50,000.

Approximately 10,000 boys & girls applied for the show. Ten girls and also ten boys were chosen to enter into the models' house.
Unlike last year, there isn't any international destination due to COVID-19 pandemic.

The winner of the competition was 20-year-old Iraklis "Hercules" Chuzhinov. He was the show's first and only male winner. He is also the only winner of the Top Model franchise to win after being eliminated and coming back.

== Cast ==
=== Judges ===
- Vicky Kaya
- Angelos Bratis
- Dimitris Skoulos
- Genevieve Majari

=== Other cast members ===
- George Karavas – mentor
- Genevieve Majari – art director

=== Contestants ===
(Ages stated are at start of contest)

Contestant	Age	Height	Hometown	Finish	Place
Chrysa Kavraki	20	1.72 m (5 ft 7 1/2 in)	Chania	Episode 8	20
Alexandra Exarchopoulou	21	1.73 m (5 ft 8 in)	Malmö, Sweden	Episode 9	19
Panagiotis Petsas	22	1.80 m (5 ft 11 in)	Athens	Episode 11	18
Irida Papoutsi	25	1.69 m (5 ft 6 1/2 in)	Agrinio	Episode 13	17
Eirini Mitrakou	18	1.70 m (5 ft 7 in)	Artemida	Episode 14	16
Konstantinos Tsentolini	18	1.81 m (5 ft 11 1/2 in)	Thessaloniki	Episode 15	15
Theodora Rachel	24	1.69 m (5 ft 6 1/2 in)	Thessaloniki	Episode 19	14
Panagiotis Antonopoulos	23	1.86 m (6 ft 1 in)	Larissa	Episode 20	13
Sifis Faradakis	20	1.84 m (6 ft 1/2 in)	Chania	Episode 21	12
Marinela Zyla	20	1.73 m (5 ft 8 in)	Rethymno	Episode 22	11
Emmanuel Elozieoua	21	1.85 m (6 ft 1 in)	Thessaloniki	Episode 23	10
Dimosthenes Tzoumanis	29	1.85 m (6 ft 1 in)	Thessaloniki	Episode 25	9
Liia Chuzhdan	20	1.72 m (5 ft 7 1/2 in)	Volos	Episode 26	8
Xenia Motskalidou	22	1.55 m (5 ft 1 in)	Athens	Episode 27	7
Mariagapi Xypolia	19	1.75 m (5 ft 9 in)	Athens	Episode 28	6
Edward Stergiou	24	1.86 m (6 ft 1 in)	Athens	Episode 29	5
Emiliano Markou	20	1.83 m (6 ft 0 in)	Athens	Episode 30	4
Andreas Athanasopoulos	20	1.89 m (6 ft 2 1/2 in)	Amaliada	Episode 30	3
Paraskevi Kerasioti	19	1.74 m (5 ft 8 1/2 in)	Patras	Episode 30	2
Hercules Tsuzinov	20	1.81 m (5 ft 11 1/2 in)	Athens	Episode 30	1

== Episode summaries ==
=== Episodes 1–5: Auditions ===
The show kicked off with the audition phase. This year the auditions took place only in Athens with all safety measures due to COVID-19 pandemic. The auditions aired for the first five episodes of the show. Before the boys and the girls went through to the judges, they are doing an interview and photoshoot with their coach George Karavas. During the auditions, the boys and the girls had a brief interview with the judges while they also walked in swimwear. In order to advance, they needed a "yes" from at least 3 of the judges. This season introduced the Wild Card. Each judge has a Wild Card, if a contestant does not advance to the next round, then a judge can issue his/her Wild Card and the contestant can advance to the Bootcamp.

Wild Card
Judge	Contestant
Vicky Kaya	Fay Vlami
Angelos Bratis	Yiorgos Rovithis
Genevieve Majari	Nikoleta Alafouzou
Dimitris Skoulos	Stella Pierridi

=== Episodes 5–6: Bootcamp ===
First Part: ID catwalk

During the bootcamp, the 84 boys & girls that advanced from the auditions took part. For the first part of the bootcamp, the boys & girls had to makes their own styling and walk in front of the judges. The ID catwalk took place at Athens.

Second Part: Photoshoot

For the second part of bootcamp, 40 boys and girls were shot by the photographer Panos Giannakopoulos. The photoshoot took place in a pool of a luxury castle house outside of Athens and models wear swimsuits and posed sitting in inflatable sunbed at the pool. Before the second part of bootcamp started, the judges gave Konstantinos Tsentolini a golden pass, so he qualified automatically to the models house. A total of 20 boys and girls passed to the models' house.

- Golden Pass Winner: Konstantinos Tsentolini
- Featured photographer: Panos Giannakopoulos

=== Episodes 7–8: Mirror Naked ===
Original airdate: September 28, 2020 - September 29, 2020

- First call-out: Emiliano Markou
- Bottom two: Alexandra Exarchopoulou and Chrysa Kavraki
- Eliminated: Chrysa Kavraki
- Featured photographer: Kosmas Koumianos

=== Episode 9: Beach Fighters ===
Original airdate: October 5, 2020

- First call-out: Edward Stergiou
- Bottom two: Alexandra Exarchopoulou and Liia Chuzhdan
- Eliminated: Alexandra Exarchopoulou
- Featured photographer: Vasilis Topouslidis

=== Episode 10: Alternative Weddings ===
Original airdate: October 6, 2020

Couple	Concept
Emiliano & Marinela	New-Vlach
Andreas & Theodora	Classic
Hercules & Panagiotis A.	Boho
Konstantinos & Mariagapi	Forced marriage
Emmanuel & Paraskevi	Gothic
Liia & Sifis	Bollywood
Dimosthenis & Xenia	Hipster
Eirini & Panagiotis P.	Easy-rider
Edward & Irida	Las Vegas

- First call-out: Hercules Tsuzinov and Panagiotis Antonopoulos
- Bottom four: Dimosthenis Tzoumanis, Eirini Mitrakou, Panagiotis Petsas and Xenia Motskalidou
- Eliminated: Xenia Motskalidou
- Featured photographer: Alexandra Argyri

=== Episode 11: Rotten Royals ===
Original airdate: October 12, 2020

- Challenge Winner: Dimosthenis Tzoumanis
- First call-out: Andreas Athanasopoulos
- Bottom two: Panagiotis Petsas and Sifis Farantakis
- Eliminated: Panagiotis Petsas
- Featured photographers: Dimitris Skoulos, Apostolis Koukousas

=== Episode 12: The Makeover ===
Original airdate: October 13, 2020

The contestants received their makeovers. There was no panel held.

- Challenge Winner: Sifis Faradakis

=== Episode 13: Crash ===
Original airdate: October 19, 2020

- First call-out: Emiliano Markou
- Bottom four: Hercules Tsuzinov, Irida Papoutsi, Liia Chuzhdan and Mariagapi Xypolia
- Eliminated: Irida Papoutsi
- Featured photographer: Giorgos Kalfamanolis

=== Episode 14: Pop Extreme ===
Original airdate: October 20, 2020

- Challenge Winners: Andreas Athanasopoulos, Emmanuel Elozieoua & Mariagapi Xypolia
- First call-out: Hercules Tsuzinov
- Bottom two: Eirini Mitrakou and Liia Chuzhdan
- Eliminated: Eirini Mitrakou
- Featured photographer: Giorgos Malekakis

=== Episode 15: Speed To Exceed ===
Original airdate: October 26, 2020

- Challenge Winner: Mariagapi Xypolia
- First call-out: Dimosthenis Tzoumanis
- Eliminated: Konstantinos Tsentolini
- Featured photographer: Panos Georgiou

=== Episode 16: Underwater ===
Original airdate: October 27, 2020

- Challenge Winner: Sifis Faradakis
- First call-out: Emiliano Markou
- Bottom two: Paraskevi Kerasioti and Theodora Rachel
- Eliminated: Paraskevi Kerasioti
- Featured photographers: Alekos Nikolaou, Dionysis Koutsis

=== Episode 17: Art Director's Show ===
Original airdate: November 2, 2020

- Immune: Emiliano Markou
- First call-out: Andreas Athanasopoulos
- Bottom two: Emmanuel Elozieoua and Hercules Tsuzinov
- Eliminated: Emmanuel Elozieoua
- Featured photographer: Aggelos Potamianos

=== Episode 18: High Parachuting ===
Original airdate: November 3, 2020

- First call-out: Mariagapi Xypolia
- Bottom two: Emiliano Markou and Hercules Tsuzinov
- Eliminated: Hercules Tsuzinov
- Featured photographer: Freddie F

=== Episode 19: We Love Greece ===
Original airdate: November 9, 2020

- First call-out: Sifis Faradakis
- Bottom two: Theodora Rachel and Dimosthenis Tzoumanis
- Eliminated: Theodora Rachel
- Featured photographer: Stefanos Papadopoulos

=== Episode 20: Dog Walkers ===
Original airdate: November 10, 2020

- Challenge Winner: Liia Chuzhdan
- First call-out: Liia Chuzhdan
- Bottom two: Marinela Zyla and Panagiotis Antonopoulos
- Eliminated: Panagiotis Antonopoulos
- Featured photographer: Apostolis Koukousas

=== Episode 21: Tiger & Dragon ===
Original airdate: November 16, 2020

- Returned: Emmanuel Elozieoua, Hercules Tsuzinov, Paraskevi Kerasioti, Xenia Motskalidou
- First call-out: Emmanuel Elozieoua & Hercules Tsuzinov
- Bottom two: Andreas Athanasopoulos & Sifis Faradakis
- Eliminated: Sifis Faradakis
- Featured photographer: Mike Tsitas

=== Episode 22: Distracted ===
Original airdate: November 17, 2020

- Challenge Winner: Liia Chuzhdan
- First call-out: Paraskevi Kerasioti
- Bottom two: Dimosthenis Tzoumanis and Marinela Zyla
- Eliminated: Marinela Zyla
- Featured photographer: Thanasis Gatos

=== Episode 23: Couples On Stilts ===
Original airdate: November 23, 2020

- First call-out: Dimosthenis Tzoumanis
- Bottom two: Emmanuel Elozieoua and Mariagapi Xypolia
- Eliminated: Emmanuel Elozieoua
- Featured photographer: Panagiotis Simopoulos

=== Episode 24: Scuba Diving ===
Original airdate: November 24, 2020

- Challenge Winner: Emiliano Markou
- Featured photographers: Dimitris Skoulos, Panos Georgiou

=== Episode 25: Urban Superheroes ===
Original airdate: November 30, 2020

- Challenge Winner: Andreas Athanasopoulos
- First call-out: Xenia Motskalidou
- Bottom two: Dimosthenis Tzoumanis and Mariagapi Xypolia
- Eliminated: Dimosthenis Tzoumanis
- Featured photographer: Panos Giannakopoulos

=== Episode 26: Pop Idols ===
Original airdate: December 1, 2020

- Challenge Winner: Hercules Tsuzinov
- First call-out: Hercules Tsuzinov
- Bottom two: Liia Chuzhdan and Xenia Motskalidou
- Eliminated: Liia Chuzhdan
- Featured photographer: Freddie F

=== Episode 27: Sand Dunes ===
Original airdate: December 7, 2020

- First call-out: Paraskevi Kerasioti
- Bottom two: Mariagapi Xypolia and Xenia Motskalidou
- Eliminated: Xenia Motskalidou
- Featured photographer: Marios Kazakos

=== Episode 28: Dante ===
Original airdate: December 8, 2020

- Challenge Winner: Edward Stergiou
- First call-out: Andreas Athanasopoulos
- Eliminated: Mariagapi Xypolia
- Featured photographers: Kostas Simos, Stefanos Papadopoulos

=== Episode 29: Bond Models ===
Original airdate: December 14, 2020

- First call-out: Emiliano Markou
- Bottom two: Andreas Athanasopoulos and Edward Stergiou
- Eliminated: Edward Stergiou
- Featured photographer: Ioanna Tzetzoumi

=== Episode 30: The Show Must Go On, The Star Of The Night, The Blue Party - Final ===
Original airdate: December 15, 2020

==== Part 1 ====
- Final four: Andreas Athanasopoulos, Emiliano Markou, Hercules Tsuzinov and Paraskevi Kerasioti
- Eliminated: Emiliano Markou

==== Part 2 ====
Scores
Nº	Model	Judges' scores						Public' scores	Total Score
Nº	Model	Photo	Vicky	Angelos	Genevieve	Dimitris	Total	Public' scores	Total Score
1	Hercules	1st	10	9	10	10	39	16.2	95.2
1	Hercules	2nd	10	10	10	10	40	16.2	95.2
2	Paraskevi	1st	9	10	9	10	38	11.0	87.0
2	Paraskevi	2nd	10	9	9	10	38	11.0	87.0
3	Andreas	1st	9	10	9	9	37	12.8	84.8
3	Andreas	2nd	9	9	8	9	35	12.8	84.8

- Final three: Andreas Athanasopoulos, Hercules Tsuzinov and Paraskevi Kerasioti
- Third place: Andreas Athanasopoulos
- Runner-up: Paraskevi Kerasioti
- Greece's Next Top Model: Hercules Tsuzinov
- Featured photographer: Dimitris Skoulos

== Results ==
Order	Episodes																					
Order	8	9	10	11	13	14	15 (Note: In episode 15, Konstantinos didn't have a photo which met the criteria for the photoshoot in order to be judged. He was automatically eliminated by the judges.)	16	17 (Note: In episode 17, Emiliano was immune from elimination for winning the challenge. Andreas had the best photo of the week.)	18	19	20	21 (Note: In episode 21, Emmanuel, Hercules, Paraskevi & Fatnia returned to the competition, they were selected by the head manager of Elite Model Management London.)	22	23	25	26	27	28	29	30	
1	Emiliano	Edward	Hercules; Panagiotis A.	Andreas	Emiliano; Dimosthenes	Hercules	Dimosthenes	Emiliano	Emiliano	Mariagapi	Sifis	Liia	Emmanuel; Hercules	Paraskevi	Dimosthenes	Xenia	Hercules	Paraskevi	Andreas	Emiliano	Hercules	Hercules
2	Andreas	Andreas	Hercules; Panagiotis A.	Konstantinos	Emiliano; Dimosthenes	Mariagapi	Emiliano	Liia	Andreas	Andreas	Marinela	Emiliano	Emmanuel; Hercules	Xenia	Emiliano	Edward	Edward	Hercules	Edward; Emiliano; Hercules; Paraskevi	Paraskevi	Andreas	Paraskevi
3	Paraskevi	Dimosthenes	Emmanuel; Paraskevi	Liia	Edward; Emmanuel	Panagiotis A.	Andreas; Edward; Emmanuel; Hercules; Liia; Mariagapi; Marinela; Panagiotis A. Paraskevi; Sifis; Theodora	Andreas	Dimosthenes	Marinela	Emiliano	Andreas	Dimosthenes; Edward	Hercules	Edward; Xenia	Paraskevi	Andreas	Edward	Edward; Emiliano; Hercules; Paraskevi	Hercules	Paraskevi	Andreas
4	Hercules	Mariagapi	Emmanuel; Paraskevi	Paraskevi	Edward; Emmanuel	Sifis	Andreas; Edward; Emmanuel; Hercules; Liia; Mariagapi; Marinela; Panagiotis A. Paraskevi; Sifis; Theodora	Panagiotis A.	Sifis	Edward	Panagiotis A.	Sifis	Dimosthenes; Edward	Mariagapi	Edward; Xenia	Emiliano	Emiliano	Emiliano	Edward; Emiliano; Hercules; Paraskevi	Andreas	Emiliano	
5	Liia	Sifis	Konstantinos; Mariagapi	Dimosthenes	Andreas; Konstantinos	Theodora	Andreas; Edward; Emmanuel; Hercules; Liia; Mariagapi; Marinela; Panagiotis A. Paraskevi; Sifis; Theodora	Hercules	Liia	Panagiotis A.	Andreas	Dimosthenes	Paraskevi; Xenia	Emmanuel	Andreas; Hercules	Andreas	Paraskevi	Andreas	Edward; Emiliano; Hercules; Paraskevi	Edward		
6	Eirini	Paraskevi	Konstantinos; Mariagapi	Mariagapi	Andreas; Konstantinos	Emiliano	Andreas; Edward; Emmanuel; Hercules; Liia; Mariagapi; Marinela; Panagiotis A. Paraskevi; Sifis; Theodora	Mariagapi	Panagiotis A.	Dimosthenes	Mariagapi	Edward	Paraskevi; Xenia	Liia	Andreas; Hercules	Hercules	Mariagapi	Mariagapi	Mariagapi			
7	Panagiotis A.	Emiliano	Andreas; Theodora	Theodora	Marinela; Sifis	Andreas	Andreas; Edward; Emmanuel; Hercules; Liia; Mariagapi; Marinela; Panagiotis A. Paraskevi; Sifis; Theodora	Dimosthenes	Edward	Theodora	Edward	Mariagapi	Mariagapi; Marinela	Andreas	Liia; Paraskevi	Liia	Xenia	Xenia				
8	Marinela	Panagiotis P.	Andreas; Theodora	Eirini	Marinela; Sifis	Edward	Andreas; Edward; Emmanuel; Hercules; Liia; Mariagapi; Marinela; Panagiotis A. Paraskevi; Sifis; Theodora	Emmanuel	Marinela	Liia	Liia	Marinela	Mariagapi; Marinela	Emiliano	Liia; Paraskevi	Mariagapi	Liia					
9	Panagiotis P.	Konstantinos	Liia; Sifis	Marinela	Eirini; Panagiotis A.	Paraskevi	Andreas; Edward; Emmanuel; Hercules; Liia; Mariagapi; Marinela; Panagiotis A. Paraskevi; Sifis; Theodora	Edward	Theodora	Sifis	Dimosthenes	Panagiotis A.	Emiliano; Liia	Edward	Mariagapi	Dimosthenes						
10	Emmanuel	Irida	Liia; Sifis	Emmanuel	Eirini; Panagiotis A.	Konstantinos	Andreas; Edward; Emmanuel; Hercules; Liia; Mariagapi; Marinela; Panagiotis A. Paraskevi; Sifis; Theodora	Sifis	Mariagapi	Emiliano	Theodora		Emiliano; Liia	Dimosthenes	Emmanuel							
11	Xenia	Emmanuel	Emiliano; Marinela	Hercules	Paraskevi; Theodora	Marinela	Andreas; Edward; Emmanuel; Hercules; Liia; Mariagapi; Marinela; Panagiotis A. Paraskevi; Sifis; Theodora	Marinela	Hercules	Hercules			Andreas	Marinela								
12	Edward	Panagiotis A.	Emiliano; Marinela	Panagiotis A.	Paraskevi; Theodora	Emmanuel	Andreas; Edward; Emmanuel; Hercules; Liia; Mariagapi; Marinela; Panagiotis A. Paraskevi; Sifis; Theodora	Theodora	Emmanuel				Sifis									
13	Mariagapi	Marinela	Edward; Irida	Irida	Hercules	Dimosthenes	Andreas; Edward; Emmanuel; Hercules; Liia; Mariagapi; Marinela; Panagiotis A. Paraskevi; Sifis; Theodora	Paraskevi														
14	Sifis	Xenia	Edward; Irida	Edward	Liia	Liia	Konstantinos															
15	Irida	Theodora	Eirini; Panagiotis P.	Emiliano	Mariagapi	Eirini																
16	Theodora	Hercules	Eirini; Panagiotis P.	Sifis	Irida																	
17	Dimosthenes	Eirini	Dimosthenes	Panagiotis P.																		
18	Konstantinos	Liia	Xenia																			
19	Alexandra	Alexandra																				
20	Chrysa																					

The contestant was eliminated
The contestant was put through collectively to the next round
The contestant was immune from elimination
The contestant won the competition

=== Bottom two ===
Episode	Contestants	Eliminated
8	Alexandra & Chrysa	Chrysa
9	Alexandra & Liia	Alexandra
10	Dimosthenis & Xennia	Xenia
11	Panagiotis P. & Sifis	Panagiotis P.
13	Irida & Mariagapi	Irida
14	Eirini & Liia	Eirini
15	None	Konstantinos
16	Paraskevi & Theodora	Paraskevi
17	Emmanuel & Hercules	Emmanuel
18	Emiliano & Hercules	Hercules
19	Dimosthenis & Theodora	Theodora
20	Marinela & Panagiotis A.	Panagiotis A.
21	Andreas & Sifis	Sifis
22	Dimosthenis & Marinela	Marinela
23	Emmanuel & Mariagapi	Emmanuel
25	Dimosthenis & Mariagapi	Dimosthenis
26	Liia & Xenia	Liia
27	Mariagapi & Xenia	Xenia
28	None	Mariagapi
29	Andreas & Edward	Edward
30	Andreas, Emiliano, Hercules & Paraskevi	Emiliano
30	Andreas, Emiliano, Hercules & Paraskevi	Andreas
30	Andreas, Emiliano, Hercules & Paraskevi	Paraskevi

The contestant was automatically eliminated by the judges
The contestant was eliminated after their first time in the bottom two
The contestant was eliminated after their second time in the bottom two
The contestant was eliminated after their third time in the bottom two
The contestant was eliminated after their fourth time in the bottom two
The contestant was eliminated in the judging and placed fourth
The contestant was eliminated in the final judging and placed third
The contestant was eliminated in the final judging and placed as the runner-up

=== Photo shoot guide ===
- Episode 6 photo shoot: Bootcamp Photoshoot
- Episode 7 photo shoot: Mirror Naked
- Episode 9 photo shoot: Beach Fighters
- Episode 10 photo shoot: Alternative Weddings
- Episode 11 photo shoot: Rotten Royals
- Episode 13 photo shoot: Crash
- Episode 14 photo shoot: Pop Extreme
- Episode 15 photo shoot: Speed To Exceed
- Episode 16 photo shoot: Underwater
- Episode 17 photo shoot: Art Director's Show
- Episode 18 photo shoot: High Parachuting
- Episode 19 photo shoot: We Love Greece
- Episode 20 photo shoot: Dog Walkers
- Episode 21 photo shoot: Tiger & Dragon
- Episode 22 photo shoot: Distracted
- Episode 23 photo shoot: Couples On Stilts
- Episode 24 photo shoot: Scuba Diving
- Episode 25 photo shoot: Urban Superheroes
- Episode 26 photo shoot: Pop Idols
- Episode 27 photo shoot: Sand Dunes
- Episode 28 photo shoot: Dante
- Episode 29 photo shoot: Bond Models
- Episode 30 photo shoot: Red carpet and Blue party

=== Average call-out order ===
Episode 15 (except top two and bottom), 28 (Except top & bottom) are not included.

Rank by average	Place	Model	Call-out total	Number of call-outs	Call-out average
1	3	Andreas	83	20	4.15
2	4	Emiliano	96	20	4.80
3	2	Paraskevi	74	15	4.93
4	1	Hercules	96	17	5.65
5	5	Edward	111	18	6.17
6	13	Panagiotis A.	72	11	6.55
7	9	Dimosthenis	106	16	6.63
8	6	Mariagapi	121	18	6.72
9	7	Xenia	68	9	7.56
10	10	Emmanuel	85	11	7.73
11	8	Liia	124	16	7.75
12	12	Sifis	95	12	7.92
13	11	Marinela	109	13	8.38
14	15	Konstantinos	63	7	9.00
15	14	Theodora	99	10	9.90
16	16	Eirini	70	6	11.67
17	18	Panagiotis P.	49	4	12.25
18	17	Irida	67	5	13.40
19	19	Alexandra	38	2	19.00
20	20	Chrysa	20	1	20.00

== Ratings ==
No. in series	No. in season	Episode	Air date	Timeslot (EET)	Ratings	Viewers (in millions)	Rank		Share		Source
No. in series	No. in season	Episode	Air date	Timeslot (EET)	Ratings	Viewers (in millions)	Daily	Weekly	Household	Adults 18-54	Source
97	1	"Auditions, Part 1"	September 7, 2020	Monday 9:00pm	7.7%	0.780	#3	#8	20.4%	28.5%	
98	2	"Auditions, Part 2"	September 8, 2020	Tuesday 9:00pm	8.0%	0.833	#1	#4	22.0%	29.8%	
99	3	"Auditions, Part 3"	September 14, 2020	Monday 9:00pm	7.7%	0.800	#3	#12	19.1%	28.6%	
100	4	"Auditions, Part 4"	September 15, 2020	Tuesday 9:00pm	6.8%	0.700	#4	#20	16.0%	23.1%	
101	5	"Auditions, Part 5 - Bootcamp: ID catwalk"	September 21, 2020	Monday 9:00pm	8.4%	0.865	#2	#11	19.6%	27.7%	
102	6	"Bootcamp: Photoshoot"	September 22, 2020	Tuesday 9:00pm	8.8%	0.908	#2	#8	21.4%	30.7%	
103	7	"Mirror Naked: Photoshoot"	September 28, 2020	Monday 9:00pm	7.9%	0.820	#4	#12	18.4%	24.2%	
104	8	"Mirror Naked: Elimination"	September 29, 2020	Tuesday 9:00pm	7.8%	0.806	#3	#15	17.8%	23.8%	
105	9	"Beach Fighters"	October 5, 2020	Monday 9:00pm	7.4%	0.767	#4	#16	18.1%	25.5%	
106	10	"Alternative Weddings"	October 6, 2020	Tuesday 9:00pm	7.6%	0.792	#3	#13	18.8%	25.9%	
107	11	"Rotten Royals"	October 12, 2020	Monday 9:00pm	7.7%	0.799	#4	#14	18.8%	25.1%	
108	12	"The Makeover"	October 13, 2020	Tuesday 9:00pm	8.6%	0.885	#3	#11	19.1%	26.3%	
109	13	"Crash"	October 19, 2020	Monday 9:00pm	7.8%	0.805	#3	#14	18.4%	24.8%	
110	14	"Pop Extreme"	October 20, 2020	Tuesday 9:00pm	7.5%	0.781	#3	#17	18.0%	26.3%	
111	15	"Speed To Exceed"	October 26, 2020	Monday 9:00pm	7.7%	0.800	#4	—N/a^{1}	18.5%	26.2%	
112	16	"Underwater"	October 27, 2020	Tuesday 9:00pm	8.3%	0.864	#3	#15	19.6%	27.4%	
113	17	"Art Director's Show"	November 2, 2020	Monday 9:00pm	8.6%	0.887	#3	#15	20.1%	27.6%	
114	18	"High Parachuting"	November 3, 2020	Tuesday 9:00pm	8.4%	0.872	#3	#16	18.9%	26.5%	
115	19	"We Love Greece"	November 9, 2020	Monday 9:00pm	8.5%	0.884	#4	#17	19.0%	25.3%	
116	20	"Dog Walkers"	November 10, 2020	Tuesday 9:00pm	9.0%	0.928	#3	#14	20.0%	27.8%	
117	21	"Tiger & Dragon"	November 16, 2020	Monday 9:00pm	9.2%	0.949	#3	#17	20.3%	27.3%	
118	22	"Distracted"	November 17, 2020	Tuesday 9:00pm	9.5%	0.980	#3	#12	20.7%	27.8%	
119	23	"Couples On Stilts"	November 23, 2020	Monday 9:00pm	8.6%	0.888	#4	—N/a^{1}	18.0%	25.6%	
120	24	"Scuba Diving"	November 24, 2020	Tuesday 9:00pm	9.1%	0.942	#4	#15	20.3%	29.1%	
121	25	"Urban Superheroes"	November 30, 2020	Monday 9:00pm	8.7%	0.904	#4	#20	20.8%	29.5%	
122	26	"Pop Idols"	December 1, 2020	Tuesday 9:00pm	8.9%	0.920	#4	#17	18.6%	25.6%	
123	27	"Sand Dunes"	December 7, 2020	Monday 9:00pm	8.9%	0.919	#4	#18	16.9%	24.3%	
124	28	"Dante"	December 8, 2020	Tuesday 9:00pm	8.5%	0.879	#5	—N/a^{1}	19.0%	25.4%	
125	29	"Bond Models"	December 14, 2020	Monday 9:00pm	9.8%	1.017	#3	#14	19.6%	26.6%	
126	30	"The Show Must Go On, The Star Of The Night, The Blue Party"	December 15, 2020	Tuesday 9:00pm	12.5%	1.291	#2	#7	30.2%	38.8%	

Note

1. Outside top 20.
