= Greece's Next Top Model season 2 =

Fourth season of Greece's Next Top Model

Greece's Next Top Model
- Season 2
- Judges: Vicky Kaya; Angelos Bratis; Iliana Papageorgiou; Dimitris Skoulos
- No. of contestants: 24
- Winners: Anna Maria Iliadou & Katia Tarabanko
- No. of episodes: 32

Release
- Original network: Star Channel
- Original release: September 8 – December 19, 2019

Season chronology
- ← Previous; Season 1 Next → Season 3

The second season of Greece's Next Top Model (abbreviated as GNTMgr) premiered on September 8, 2019 on Star Channel.

Vicky Kaya, Angelos Bratis, Iliana Papageorgiou and Dimitris Skoulos returned as judges, with Elena Chistopoulou and Genevieve Majari also returning to their roles.

The prizes for this season included a modelling contract with PLACE models in Hamburg, a cover and spread with Madame Figaro magazine, a contract with Dust & Cream cosmetics and a cash prize of €50,000.

Approximately 7,000 girls applied for the show. 400 girls were invited to the audition rounds. 70 girls were then selected to enter the Bootcamp. 24 girls, this season, were chosen to enter into the models' house.

The winners of this season were 18-year-old Anna Maria Iliadou and 23-year-old Katia Tarabanko. The double win was due to the viewers not being able to vote online due to the site crashing, leaving only the judges’ scores in which there was a tie.

The two winners were photographed in a double cover and spread in the Madame Figaro Greece April 2020 issue.

== Cast ==
=== Contestants ===
(Ages stated are at start of contest)

Contestant	Age	Height	Hometown	Finish	Place
Katerina Peftitsi	26	1.64 m (5 ft 4 1/2 in)	Katerini	Episode 8	24
Argyro Maglari	25	1.70 m (5 ft 7 in)	Thessaloniki	Episode 9	23
Silia Evangelou	24	1.83 m (6 ft 0 in)	Ioannina	Episode 10	22
Lydia Katsanikaki	21	1.68 m (5 ft 6 in)	Chania	Episode 12	21
Ioanna Kyritsi	21	1.76 m (5 ft 9 1/2 in)	Milos	Episode 13	20
Gloria Deniki	21	1.66 m (5 ft 5 1/2 in)	Nea Moudania	Episode 14	19
Nina Tzivanidou	25	1.73 m (5 ft 8 in)	Limassol, Cyprus	Episode 15	18
Martina Khafichuk	23	1.81 m (5 ft 11 1/2 in)	Patras	Episode 17	17 (quit)
Olga Kalogirou	20	1.85 m (6 ft 1 in)	Kastoria	Episode 17	16
Suzanna Cuol	20	1.79 m (5 ft 10 1/2 in)	Athens	Episode 18	15
Spyroula Kaizer	24	1.70 m (5 ft 7 in)	Limassol, Cyprus	Episode 19	14
Marina Grigoriou	24	1.70 m (5 ft 7 in)	Thessaloniki	Episode 20	13
Emmanuela Maina	21	1.71 m (5 ft 7 1/2 in)	Thessaloniki	Episode 24	12
Asimina Charitou	27	1.77 m (5 ft 9 1/2 in)	Heraklion	Episode 25	11
Eleftheria Karnava	20	1.71 m (5 ft 7 1/2 in)	Athens	Episode 26	10
Popi Galetsa	29	1.67 m (5 ft 5 1/2 in)	New Moudania	Episode 27	9-8
Konstantina Florou	19	1.74 m (5 ft 8 1/2 in)	Drama	Episode 27	9-8
Ilda Kroni	24	1.75 m (5 ft 9 in)	Thessaloniki	Episode 28	7
Anna Hadji	19	1.81 m (5 ft 11 1/2 in)	Athens	Episode 29	6
Hara Pappa	24	1.75 m (5 ft 9 in)	Igoumenitsa	Episode 30	5
Maria Michalopoulou	19	1.73 m (5 ft 8 in)	Corinth	Episode 31	4
Keisi Mizhiu	24	1.76 m (5 ft 9 1/2 in)	Kavala	Episode 32	3
Katia Tarabanko	23	1.73 m (5 ft 8 in)	Athens	Episode 32	1
Anna Maria Iliadou	18	1.76 m (5 ft 9 1/2 in)	Athens	Episode 32	1

=== Judges ===
- Vicky Kaya
- Angelos Bratis
- Iliana Papageorgiou
- Dimitris Skoulos

=== Other cast members ===
- Elena Christopoulou – mentor
- Genevieve Majari – art director

== Episode summaries ==
=== Episodes 1–5: Auditions ===
The show kicked off with the audition phase. Auditions took place in two different cities: Athens and Thessaloniki. The auditions aired for the first five episodes of the show. During the auditions, the girls had a brief interview with the judges while they also walked in swimwear, if asked. In order to advance, they needed a "yes" from at least 3 of the judges.

=== Episodes 6–7: Bootcamp ===
During the bootcamp, the 70 girls that advanced from the auditions took part. For the first part of the bootcamp, the girls had to walk in a fashion runway for the Greek fashion designer George Eleftheriades. The runway took place at Rouf railway station in Athens. Before the bootcamp started, the judges gave Eleftheria Karnava a golden pass, so she qualified automatically to the models' house. For the second part of bootcamp, 41 girls were shot by the photographer Kosmas Koumianos. The photoshoot took place in Athens Reef Riviera beach and girls wear swimsuits and posed at the beach. A total of 24 girls passed to the models' house.

- Golden Pass Winner: Eleftheria Karnava
- Featured photographer: Kosmas Koumianos

=== Episode 8: Vertical Runway ===
Original airdate: October 1, 2019

- Top 2: Eleftheria Karnava & Konstantina Florou
- First call-out: Konstantina Florou
- Eliminated outside of judging panel: Katerina Peftitsi & Popi Galetsa

=== Episode 9: Snakes ===
Original airdate: October 7, 2019

- First call-out: Nina Tzivanidou
- Bottom two: Argyro Maglari & Gloria Deniki
- Eliminated: Argyro Maglari
- Featured photographer: Apostolis Koukousas

=== Episode 10: Celebrate Your Body ===
Original airdate: October 8, 2019

- First call-out: Keisi Mizhiu
- Bottom two: Silia Evangelou & Ioanna Kyritsi
- Eliminated: Silia Evangelou
- Featured photographer: George Malekakis

=== Episode 11: The Makeover ===
Original airdate: October 14, 2019

=== Episode 12: Containers ===
Original airdate: October 15, 2019

- First call-out: Eleftheria Karnava
- Bottom two: Anna Hatzi & Lydia Katsanikaki
- Eliminated: Lydia Katsanikaki
- Featured photographer: Marios Kazakos

=== Episode 13: Hanging Fashion ===
Original airdate: October 21, 2019

- First call-out: Katia Tarabanko
- Bottom two: Gloria Deniki & Ioanna Kyritsi
- Eliminated: Ioanna Kyritsi
- Featured photographer: Vasilis Topouslidis

=== Episode 14: Rodeo ===
Original airdate: October 22, 2019

- First call-out: Anna Hatzi & Konstantina Florou
- Bottom two: Gloria Deniki & Olga Kalogirou
- Eliminated: Gloria Deniki
- Featured photographer: Katerina Tsatsani

=== Episode 15: Floating Ball ===
Original airdate: October 28, 2019

- First call-out: Anna Hatzi
- Bottom two: Nina Tzivanidou & Spyroula Kaizer
- Eliminated: Nina Tzivanidou
- Featured photographers: Athina Liaskou, Bill Georgoussis

=== Episode 16: Bratis Fashion Show ===
Original airdate: October 29, 2019

- Immune: Anna Hatzi
- First call-out: Anna Maria Iliadou
- Bottom two: Spyroula Kaizer & Suzanna Kuol
- Eliminated: Suzanna Kuol
- Featured photographer: Kostas Sapi

=== Episode 17: Farming ===
Original airdate: November 4, 2019

- Quit: Martina Khafichuk
- Returned: Suzanna Kuol
- Challenge winner: Hara Pappa
- First call-out: Keisi Mizhiu
- Bottom two: Marina Grigoriou & Olga Kalogirou
- Eliminated: Olga Kalogirou
- Featured photographers: Kostas Sapi, Freddie F

=== Episode 18: Illusions ===
Original airdate: November 5, 2019

- Challenge winners: Eleftheria Karnava & Emmanuela Maina
- First call-out: Ilda Kroni
- Bottom two: Eleftheria Karnava & Suzanna Kuol
- Eliminated: Suzanna Kuol
- Featured photographer: Stefanos Papadopoulos

=== Episode 19: Style On A Rush ===
Original airdate: November 11, 2019

- First call-out: Maria Michalopoulou
- Bottom two: Ilda Kroni & Spyroula Kaizer
- Eliminated: Spyroula Kaizer
- Featured photographer: Athina Liaskou

=== Episode 20: Perfect Influencer ===
Original airdate: November 12, 2019

- First call-out: Katia Tarabanko
- Bottom two: Anna Hatzi & Marina Grigoriou
- Eliminated: Marina Grigoriou
- Featured photographer: Aggelos Potamianos

=== Episode 21: MasterChef ===
Original airdate: November 18, 2019

- Challenge winner: Katia Tarabanko
- First call-out: Anna Hatzi
- Bottom two: Eleftheria Karnava & Keisi Mizhiu
- Eliminated: Eleftheria Karnava
- Featured photographer: Nikos Maliakos

=== Episode 22: Urban Mary Poppins ===
Original airdate: November 19, 2019

- Challenge winner: Hara Pappa
- First call-out: Hara Pappa
- Bottom two: Asimina Charitou & Emmanuela Maina
- Eliminated: Emmanuela Maina
- Featured photographer: Petros Sofikitis

=== Episode 23: Survival Camp ===
Original airdate: November 25, 2019

- Challenge winner: Maria Michalopoulou
- First call-out: Maria Michalopoulou
- Bottom three: Asimina Charitou, Hara Pappa & Katia Tarabanko
- Eliminated: None
- Featured photographer: Akis Paraskevopoulos

=== Episode 24: Madame Figaro ===
Original airdate: November 26, 2019

- Returned: Eleftheria Karnava, Emmanuela Maina & Popi Galetsa
- First call-out: Maria Michalopoulou
- Bottom two: Asimina Charitou & Emmanuela Maina
- Eliminated: Emmanuela Maina
- Featured photographer: Christos Predoulis

=== Episode 25: Heaven ===
Original airdate: December 2, 2019

- Challenge winners: Katia Tarabanko & Keisi Mizhiu
- First call-out: Anna Hatzi
- Bottom two: Asimina Charitou & Maria Michalopoulou
- Eliminated: Asimina Charitou
- Featured photographer: Panos Giannakopoulos

=== Episode 26: Fashion Siamese ===
Original airdate: December 3, 2019

- Challenge winner: Anna Hatzi
- First call-out: Maria Michalopoulou
- Bottom two: Anna Hatzi & Eleftheria Karnava
- Eliminated: Eleftheria Karnava
- Featured photographer: Dionysis Koutsis

=== Episode 27: Advertising Teaser ===
Original airdate: December 9, 2019

- First call-out: Katia Tarabanko & Keisi Mizhiu
- Bottom two: Konstantina Florou & Popi Galetsa
- Eliminated: Both

=== Episode 28: Constructing Fashion ===
Original airdate: December 10, 2019

- First call-out: Katia Tarabanko
- Bottom two: Anna Hatzi & Ilda Kroni
- Eliminated: Ilda Kroni
- Featured photographer: Apostolis Koukousas

=== Episode 29: Red Riding Hood ===
Original airdate: December 12, 2019

- Challenge winner: Anna Hatzi & Anna Maria Iliadou
- First call-out: Anna Maria Iliadou
- Bottom two: Anna Hatzi & Hara Pappa
- Eliminated: Anna Hatzi
- Featured photographer: Kosmas Koumianos

=== Episode 30: Trip To Milan ===
Original airdate: December 16, 2019

- Challenge winners: Katia Tarabanko & Keisi Mizhiu
- First call-out: Anna Maria Iliadou
- Bottom two: Hara Pappa & Katia Tarabanko
- Eliminated: Hara Pappa
- Featured photographer: Leonidas Diamantidis

=== Episode 31: Widows - Racing Cars & Girls ===
Original airdate: December 17, 2019

- First call-out: Keisi Mizhiu
- Bottom two: Anna Maria Iliadou & Maria Michalopoulou
- Eliminated: Maria Michalopoulou
- Featured photographer: Nicolas Aristidou

=== Episode 32: The Preparation / Towels, The Party / Havana Club, The After Party / Dancing In The Rain - Final ===
Original airdate: December 19, 2019

Scores
Nº	Model	Judges' scores						Total Score
Nº	Model	#	Vicky	Angelos	Iliana	Dimitris	Total	Total Score
1	Anna Maria	Photo 1	10	10	10	10	40	112
1	Anna Maria	Photo 2	8	9	8	8	33	112
1	Anna Maria	Photo 3	10	10	10	9	39	112
2	Keisi	Photo 1	9	8	9	9	35	108
2	Keisi	Photo 2	9	10	9	9	37	108
2	Keisi	Photo 3	9	9	9	9	36	108
3	Katia	Photo 1	9	9	9	9	36	112
3	Katia	Photo 2	10	8	10	10	38	112
3	Katia	Photo 3	9	10	9	10	38	112

- Final three: Anna Maria Iliadou, Katia Tarabanko & Keisi Mizhiu
- Third place: Keisi Mizhiu
- Greece's Next Top Model: Anna Maria Iliadou & Katia Tarabanko
- Featured photographer: Dimitris Skoulos

== Results ==
Order	Episodes																							
Order	8 (Note: In episode 9, Katerina & Popi were eliminated outside of judging panel for failing to walk at the vertical runway.)	9	10	12	13	14 (Note: In episode 14, Anna & Konstantina shared the first call out.)	15	16 (Note: In episode 16, Anna was immune from elimination. Anna Maria had the first call out.)	17 (Note: In episode 17, Martina quit the competition, therefore Suzanna was allowed to return.)	18	19	20	21	22	23 (Note: In episode 23, Asimina, Hara & Katia were part of a non-elimination bottom three.)	24 (Note: In episode 24, Eleftheria, Emmanuela & Popi returned to competition.)	25	26	27 (Note: In episode 27, Katia & Keisi shared the first call out.)	28	29	30	31	32
1	Konstantina	Nina	Keisi	Eleftheria	Katia	Anna; Konstantina	Anna	Anna	Keisi	Ilda	Maria	Katia	Anna	Hara	Maria	Maria	Anna	Maria	Katia; Keisi	Katia	Anna Maria	Anna Maria	Keisi	Anna Maria; Katia
2	Eleftheria	Spyroula	Hara	Nina	Ilda	Anna; Konstantina	Ilda	Anna Maria	Emmanuela	Maria	Hara	Konstantina	Ilda	Anna Maria	Ilda	Ilda	Konstantina	Ilda	Katia; Keisi	Anna Maria	Katia	Keisi	Katia	Anna Maria; Katia
3	Anna; Anna Maria; Argyro; Asimina; Emmanuela; Gloria; Hara; Ilda; Ioanna; Katia; Keisi; Lydia; Maria; Marina; Martina; Nina; Olga; Silia; Spyroula; Suzanna	Hara	Katia	Spyroula	Hara	Katia	Katia	Maria	Konstantina	Hara	Eleftheria	Maria	Anna Maria	Katia	Konstantina	Katia	Keisi	Katia	Maria	Keisi	Keisi	Maria	Anna Maria	Keisi
4	Anna; Anna Maria; Argyro; Asimina; Emmanuela; Gloria; Hara; Ilda; Ioanna; Katia; Keisi; Lydia; Maria; Marina; Martina; Nina; Olga; Silia; Spyroula; Suzanna	Anna Maria	Asimina	Ioanna	Eleftheria	Marina	Konstantina	Asimina	Hara	Keisi	Konstantina	Ilda	Hara	Ilda	Anna	Eleftheria	Katia	Hara	Hara	Maria	Maria	Katia	Maria	
5	Anna; Anna Maria; Argyro; Asimina; Emmanuela; Gloria; Hara; Ilda; Ioanna; Katia; Keisi; Lydia; Maria; Marina; Martina; Nina; Olga; Silia; Spyroula; Suzanna	Konstantina	Spyroula	Asimina	Asimina	Ilda	Maria	Ilda	Anna Maria	Konstantina	Marina	Keisi	Konstantina	Konstantina	Keisi	Keisi	Popi	Keisi	Anna Maria	Hara	Hara	Hara		
6	Anna; Anna Maria; Argyro; Asimina; Emmanuela; Gloria; Hara; Ilda; Ioanna; Katia; Keisi; Lydia; Maria; Marina; Martina; Nina; Olga; Silia; Spyroula; Suzanna	Asimina	Anna	Emmanuela	Anna Maria	Martina	Suzanna	Konstantina	Ilda	Emmanuela	Asimina	Hara	Maria	Anna	Anna Maria	Popi	Ilda	Anna Maria	Ilda	Anna	Anna			
7	Anna; Anna Maria; Argyro; Asimina; Emmanuela; Gloria; Hara; Ilda; Ioanna; Katia; Keisi; Lydia; Maria; Marina; Martina; Nina; Olga; Silia; Spyroula; Suzanna	Emmanuela	Maria	Konstantina	Keisi	Emmanuela	Martina	Martina	Asimina	Spyroula	Anna Maria	Eleftheria	Emmanuela	Keisi	Asimina; Hara; Katia	Hara	Anna Maria	Popi	Anna	Ilda				
8	Anna; Anna Maria; Argyro; Asimina; Emmanuela; Gloria; Hara; Ilda; Ioanna; Katia; Keisi; Lydia; Maria; Marina; Martina; Nina; Olga; Silia; Spyroula; Suzanna	Ilda	Martina	Hara	Spyroula	Maria	Emmanuela	Olga	Katia	Katia	Emmanuela	Anna Maria	Katia	Maria	Asimina; Hara; Katia	Konstantina	Eleftheria	Konstantina	Konstantina; Popi					
9	Anna; Anna Maria; Argyro; Asimina; Emmanuela; Gloria; Hara; Ilda; Ioanna; Katia; Keisi; Lydia; Maria; Marina; Martina; Nina; Olga; Silia; Spyroula; Suzanna	Martina	Anna Maria	Martina	Marina	Keisi	Marina	Hara	Maria	Anna	Keisi	Emmanuela	Asimina	Asimina	Asimina; Hara; Katia	Anna Maria	Hara	Anna	Konstantina; Popi					
10	Anna; Anna Maria; Argyro; Asimina; Emmanuela; Gloria; Hara; Ilda; Ioanna; Katia; Keisi; Lydia; Maria; Marina; Martina; Nina; Olga; Silia; Spyroula; Suzanna	Maria	Eleftheria	Marina	Emmanuela	Hara	Anna Maria	Emmanuela	Eleftheria	Anna Maria	Anna	Asimina	Keisi	Emmanuela		Anna	Maria	Eleftheria						
11	Anna; Anna Maria; Argyro; Asimina; Emmanuela; Gloria; Hara; Ilda; Ioanna; Katia; Keisi; Lydia; Maria; Marina; Martina; Nina; Olga; Silia; Spyroula; Suzanna	Silia	Marina	Olga	Olga	Suzanna	Eleftheria	Keisi	Spyroula	Marina	Katia	Anna	Eleftheria			Asimina	Asimina							
12	Anna; Anna Maria; Argyro; Asimina; Emmanuela; Gloria; Hara; Ilda; Ioanna; Katia; Keisi; Lydia; Maria; Marina; Martina; Nina; Olga; Silia; Spyroula; Suzanna	Eleftheria	Ilda	Katia	Anna	Eleftheria	Asimina	Katia	Suzanna	Asimina	Ilda	Marina				Emmanuela								
13	Anna; Anna Maria; Argyro; Asimina; Emmanuela; Gloria; Hara; Ilda; Ioanna; Katia; Keisi; Lydia; Maria; Marina; Martina; Nina; Olga; Silia; Spyroula; Suzanna	Lydia	Olga	Maria	Konstantina	Spyroula	Olga	Eleftheria	Anna	Eleftheria	Spyroula													
14	Anna; Anna Maria; Argyro; Asimina; Emmanuela; Gloria; Hara; Ilda; Ioanna; Katia; Keisi; Lydia; Maria; Marina; Martina; Nina; Olga; Silia; Spyroula; Suzanna	Keisi	Konstantina	Gloria	Maria	Nina	Keisi	Marina	Marina	Suzanna														
15	Anna; Anna Maria; Argyro; Asimina; Emmanuela; Gloria; Hara; Ilda; Ioanna; Katia; Keisi; Lydia; Maria; Marina; Martina; Nina; Olga; Silia; Spyroula; Suzanna	Olga	Nina	Ilda	Nina	Anna Maria	Hara	Spyroula	Olga															
16	Anna; Anna Maria; Argyro; Asimina; Emmanuela; Gloria; Hara; Ilda; Ioanna; Katia; Keisi; Lydia; Maria; Marina; Martina; Nina; Olga; Silia; Spyroula; Suzanna	Marina	Emmanuela	Keisi	Suzanna	Asimina	Spyroula	Suzanna	Martina															
17	Anna; Anna Maria; Argyro; Asimina; Emmanuela; Gloria; Hara; Ilda; Ioanna; Katia; Keisi; Lydia; Maria; Marina; Martina; Nina; Olga; Silia; Spyroula; Suzanna	Katia	Lydia	Suzanna	Martina	Olga	Nina																	
18	Anna; Anna Maria; Argyro; Asimina; Emmanuela; Gloria; Hara; Ilda; Ioanna; Katia; Keisi; Lydia; Maria; Marina; Martina; Nina; Olga; Silia; Spyroula; Suzanna	Ioanna	Suzanna	Anna Maria	Gloria	Gloria																		
19	Anna; Anna Maria; Argyro; Asimina; Emmanuela; Gloria; Hara; Ilda; Ioanna; Katia; Keisi; Lydia; Maria; Marina; Martina; Nina; Olga; Silia; Spyroula; Suzanna	Anna	Gloria	Anna	Ioanna																			
20	Anna; Anna Maria; Argyro; Asimina; Emmanuela; Gloria; Hara; Ilda; Ioanna; Katia; Keisi; Lydia; Maria; Marina; Martina; Nina; Olga; Silia; Spyroula; Suzanna	Suzanna	Ioanna	Lydia																				
21	Anna; Anna Maria; Argyro; Asimina; Emmanuela; Gloria; Hara; Ilda; Ioanna; Katia; Keisi; Lydia; Maria; Marina; Martina; Nina; Olga; Silia; Spyroula; Suzanna	Gloria	Silia																					
22	Anna; Anna Maria; Argyro; Asimina; Emmanuela; Gloria; Hara; Ilda; Ioanna; Katia; Keisi; Lydia; Maria; Marina; Martina; Nina; Olga; Silia; Spyroula; Suzanna	Argyro																						
23	Katerina; Popi																							
24	Katerina; Popi																							

The contestant was eliminated outside of judging panel
The contestant was eliminated
The contestant was immune from elimination
The contestant quit the competition
The contestant was part of a non-elimination bottom three
The contestant won the competition

=== Bottom two ===
Episode	Contestants	Eliminated
8	Katerina & Popi	Katerina
8	Katerina & Popi	Popi
9	Argyro & Gloria	Argyro
10	Ioanna & Silia	Silia
12	Anna & Lydia	Lydia
13	Gloria & Ioanna	Ioanna
14	Gloria & Olga	Gloria
15	Nina & Spyroula	Nina
16	Suzanna & Spyroula	Suzanna
17	Marina & Olga	Martina
17	Marina & Olga	Olga
18	Eleftheria & Suzanna	Suzanna
19	Ilda & Spyroula	Spyroula
20	Anna & Marina	Marina
21	Eleftheria & Keisi	Eleftheria
22	Asimina & Emmanouela	Emmanouela
23	Asimina, Hara & Katia	None
24	Asimina & Emmanouela	Emmanouela
25	Asimina & Maria	Asimina
26	Anna & Eleftheria	Eleftheria
27	Konstantina & Popi	Konstantina
27	Konstantina & Popi	Popi
28	Anna & Ilda	Ilda
29	Anna & Hara	Anna
30	Hara & Katia	Hara
31	Anna Maria & Maria	Maria
32	Anna Maria, Katia & Keisi	Keisi

The contestant was eliminated outside of judging panel
The contestant was put through collectively to the next round
The contestant quit the competition
The contestant was eliminated after her first time in the bottom two
The contestant was eliminated after her second time in the bottom two
The contestant was eliminated after her third time in the bottom two
The contestant was eliminated after her fourth time in the bottom two
The contestant was eliminated after her fifth time in the bottom two
The contestant was eliminated in the final judging and placed as the runner-up

=== Average call-out order ===
Episode 8 (except for top 2 and bottom 2) & 32 are not included.

Rank by average	Place	Model	Call-out total	Number of call-outs	Call-out average
1	1	Katia	117	22	5.32
2	7	Ilda	103	19	5.42
3	4	Maria	120	22	5.45
4	8	Konstantina	104	19	5.47
5	5	Hara	116	21	5.52
6	3	Keisi	136	22	6.18
7	1	Anna Maria	139	22	6.32
8	6	Anna	152	20	7.60
9	10	Eleftheria	131	16	8.19
10	11	Asimina	134	16	8.38
11	12	Emmanuela	118	14	8.43
12	17	Martina	63	7	9.00
13	14	Spyroula	93	10	9.30
14	9	Popi	49	5	9.80
15	13	Marina	115	11	10.45
16	18	Nina	64	6	10.67
17	16	Olga	103	8	12.88
18	15	Suzanna	130	9	14.44
19	20	Ioanna	61	4	15.25
20	22	Silia	32	2	16.00
21	21	Lydia	50	3	16.67
22	19	Gloria	90	5	18.00
23	23	Argyro	22	1	22.00
24	24	Katerina	23	1	23.00

== Ratings ==
No. in series	No. in season	Episode	Air date	Timeslot (EET)	Ratings	Viewers (in millions)	Rank		Share		Source
No. in series	No. in season	Episode	Air date	Timeslot (EET)	Ratings	Viewers (in millions)	Daily	Weekly	Household	Adults 18-54	Source
65	1	"Auditions, Part 1"	September 8, 2019	Sunday 9:00pm	6.8%	0.709	#2	#16	19.9%	25.4%	
66	2	"Auditions, Part 2"	September 9, 2019	Monday 9:00pm	8.2%	0.846	#1	#2	22.4%	29.9%	
67	3	"Auditions, Part 3"	September 16, 2019	Monday 9:00pm	7.7%	0.793	#1	#5	20.5%	26.8%	
68	4	"Auditions, Part 4"	September 17, 2019	Tuesday 9:00pm	8.4%	0.869	#1	#1	22.6%	30.6%	
69	5	"Auditions, Part 5"	September 23, 2019	Monday 9:00pm	9.0%	0.938	#2	#6	21.7%	27.7%	
70	6	"Bootcamp, Part 1"	September 24, 2019	Tuesday 9:00pm	9.5%	0.983	#1	#4	22.1%	28.5%	
71	7	"Bootcamp, Part 2"	September 30, 2019	Monday 9:00pm	9.0%	0.938	#2	#8	22.1%	29.0%	
72	8	"Vertical Runway"	October 1, 2019	Tuesday 9:00pm	8.5%	0.877	#2	#9	20.7%	28.0%	
73	9	"Snakes"	October 7, 2019	Monday 9:00pm	9.3%	0.960	#2	#9	21.3%	27.7%	
74	10	"Celebrate Your Body"	October 8, 2019	Tuesday 9:00pm	9.5%	0.980	#2	#8	21.4%	28.7%	
75	11	"The Makeover"	October 14, 2019	Monday 9:00pm	9.3%	0.961	#2	#8	21.0%	27.8%	
76	12	"Containers"	October 15, 2019	Tuesday 9:00pm	8.6%	0.891	#2	#10	20.0%	25.9%	
77	13	"Hanging Fashion"	October 21, 2019	Monday 9:00pm	9.8%	1.016	#2	#8	22.9%	30.0%	
78	14	"Rodeo"	October 22, 2019	Tuesday 9:00pm	10.4%	1.081	#2	#7	24.0%	34.2%	
79	15	"Floating Ball"	October 28, 2019	Monday 9:00pm	8.7%	0.905	#3	#14	20.5%	27.4%	
80	16	"Bratis Fashion Show"	October 29, 2019	Tuesday 9:00pm	9.3%	0.969	#3	#11	21.8%	29.9%	
81	17	"Farming"	November 4, 2019	Monday 9:00pm	9.4%	0.972	#3	#10	22.7%	30.8%	
82	18	"Illusions"	November 5, 2019	Tuesday 9:00pm	10.2%	1.059	#2	#8	24.2%	31.8%	
83	19	"Styling On A Rush"	November 11, 2019	Monday 9:00pm	10.2%	1.056	#2	#10	23.6%	31.8%	
84	20	"Perfect Influencer"	November 12, 2019	Tuesday 9:00pm	10.6%	1.097	#2	#7	23.7%	31.8%	
85	21	"MasterChef"	November 18, 2019	Monday 9:00pm	10.7%	1.109	#2	#7	24.1%	33.1%	
86	22	"Urban Mary Poppins"	November 19, 2019	Tuesday 9:00pm	11.5%	1.195	#2	#5	25.6%	33.3%	
87	23	"Survival Camp"	November 25, 2019	Monday 9:00pm	10.8%	1.115	#2	#5	24.0%	30.5%	
88	24	"Madame Figaro"	November 26, 2019	Tuesday 9:00pm	9.5%	0.982	#2	#9	23.4%	32.8%	
89	25	"Heaven"	December 2, 2019	Monday 9:00pm	10.5%	1.087	#2	#8	25.1%	34.4%	
90	26	"Fashion Siamese"	December 3, 2019	Tuesday 9:00pm	10.6%	1.095	#2	#7	25.8%	36.5%	
91	27	"Advertising Teaser"	December 9, 2019	Monday 9:00pm	11.0%	1.138	#2	#8	25.4%	35.6%	
92	28	"Constructing Fashion"	December 10, 2019	Tuesday 9:00pm	11.3%	1.172	#2	#6	24.4%	30.7%	
93	29	"Red Riding Hood"	December 12, 2019	Thursday 9:00pm	9.7%	1.009	#2	#11	22.8%	29.0%	
94	30	"Trip To Milan"	December 16, 2019	Monday 9:00pm	11.0%	1.144	#2	#8	25.8%	33.7%	
95	31	"Widows - Racing Cars & Girls"	December 17, 2019	Tuesday 9:00pm	11.6%	1.201	#2	#7	27.4%	34.5%	
96	32	"The Preparation / Towels, The Party / Havana Club, The After Party / Dancing In The Rain"	December 19, 2019	Thursday 9:00pm	12.9%	1.337	#2	#6	33.2%	42.6%	
