= Greece's Next Top Model season 5 =

Greece's Next Top Model
- Season 5
- Judges: Vicky Kaya; Anastasios Sofroniou; Yiorgos Karavas
- No. of contestants: 26
- Winner: Aléksia Trajko
- No. of episodes: 30

Release
- Original network: Star Channel
- Original release: September 19 – December 23, 2022

Season chronology
- ← Previous; Season 4 Next → Season 6

The fifth season of Greece's Next Top Model (abbreviated as GNTMgr), premiered on September 19, 2022 on Star Channel. Vicky Kaya returned as the show's head judge after marking her absence in the previous cycle. The season introduced a diverse all-female cast.

The prizes for this season included a contract with Dust & Cream cosmetics, a 2-year scholarship with IEK Alfa academy, a jewelry set from Georg Jensen worth €20,000, a brand new Citroën Ami and a cash prize of €50,000.

The winner of the competition was 19-year-old Aléksia Trajko from Thessaloniki.

== Cast ==
=== Contestants ===
(Ages stated are at start of contest)

Contestant	Age	Height	Hometown	Finish	Place
Anna Venetsaki	47	1.67 m (5 ft 5 1/2 in)	Crete	Episode 7	26 (quit)
Katerina Kara	27	1.70 m (5 ft 7 in)	Ioannina	Episode 7	25
Nagia Kontostergiou	18	1.68 m (5 ft 6 in)	Kavala	Episode 8	24
Evelina Petrougaki	22	1.79 m (5 ft 10 1/2 in)	Athens	Episode 9	23 (quit)
Efpraxia 'Efi' Banti	53	1.80 m (5 ft 11 in)	Naoussa	Episode 9	22 (quit)
Elena Lysandrou	18	1.64 m (5 ft 4 1/2 in)	Larnaca, Cyprus	Episode 10	21
Aleksia Kouvela	25	1.75 m (5 ft 9 in)	Thessaloniki	Episode 11	20 (quit)
Nikol Tsoulos	23	1.80 m (5 ft 11 in)	Toronto, Canada	Episode 11	19 (quit)
Tzoulia Iligenko	18	1.80 m (5 ft 11 in)	Chania	Episode 12	18
Dorela Geka	18	1.80 m (5 ft 11 in)	Crete	Episode 14	17
Yeva Bondarénko	19	1.66 m (5 ft 5 1/2 in)	Kharkiv, Ukraine	Episode 15	16
Despoina Sarri	20	1.72 m (5 ft 7 1/2 in)	Petroupoli	Episode 16	15
Zoe Ioannidou	26	1.77 m (5 ft 9 1/2 in)	Larnaca, Cyprus	Episode 17	14
Maria Costa	30	1.74 m (5 ft 8 1/2 in)	Nicosia, Cyprus	Episode 20	13
Eirini Andoniou	18	1.74 m (5 ft 8 1/2 in)	Larnaca, Cyprus	Episode 21	12
Grigoriana Plyta	22	1.70 m (5 ft 7 in)	Nicosia, Cyprus	Episode 22	11
Georgianna Ioakeimidou	21	1.81 m (5 ft 11 1/2 in)	Lefkada	Episode 23	10
Rafaela Charalambous	30	1.73 m (5 ft 8 in)	Nicosia, Cyprus	Episode 24	9
Katya Kizima	29	1.71 m (5 ft 7 1/2 in)	Dnipro, Ukraine	Episode 25	8
Mikaela Novak-Marli	47	1.74 m (5 ft 8 1/2 in)	Thessaloniki	Episode 26	7
Myria Kyriakidou	19	1.73 m (5 ft 8 in)	Paphos, Cyprus	Episode 27	6
Mara Marli	19	1.85 m (6 ft 1 in)	Thessaloniki	Episode 28	5
Coty Gougousi-Camacho	21	1.86 m (6 ft 1 in)	Thessaloniki	Episode 29	4 (quit)
Victoria Muroforidou	21	1.71 m (5 ft 7 1/2 in)	Thessaloniki	Episode 30	3
Marita Kathitzioti	23	1.78 m (5 ft 10 in)	Paphos, Cyprus	Episode 30	2
Aléksia Trajko	19	1.72 m (5 ft 7 1/2 in)	Thessaloniki	Episode 30	1

=== Judges ===
- Vicky Kaya
- Anastasios Sofroniou
- Yiorgos Karavas
- Sophia Hadjipanteli (Auditions only)

=== Other cast members ===
- Mary Vitinaros – model instructor
- Christos Birbas – coach
- Elena Galifa - model interviewer

== Episode summaries ==
=== Episodes 1–5: Auditions ===
The show kicked off with the audition phase. Auditions took place in two different cities: Athens and Thessaloniki. The auditions aired for the first episodes of the show. During the auditions, the girls had a brief interview with the judges while they also walked in swimwear, if asked. In order to advance, they needed a "yes" from at least 3 of the judges.

Wild Card
Judge	Contestant
Vicky Kaya	
Anastasios Sofroniou	
Yiorgos Karavas	Athina Loizou
Sophia Hadjipanteli	Katerina Nikou

=== Episodes 5–6: Bootcamp ===
First Part: ID catwalk

Second Part: Photoshoot

- Golden Pass Winner: Katya Kizima
- Featured photographer: Kostas Sapounis

=== Episode 7: Wuthering Heights ===
Original airdate: 10 October 2022

- Quit: Anna Venetsaki
- Entered: Nagia Kontostergiou
- First call-out: Aléksia Trajko
- Bottom two: Katerina Kara & Myria Kyriakidou
- Eliminated: Katerina Kara
- Featured photographer: Ioanna Tzetzoumi

=== Episode 8: Drive-Thru Diner ===
Original airdate: 11 October 2022

- First call-out: Yeva Bondarénko
- Bottom two: Despoina Sarri & Nagia Kontostergiou
- Eliminated: Nagia Kontostergiou
- Featured photographer: Mike Tsitas

=== Episode 9: Tennis ===
Original airdate: 17 October 2022

- Quit: Efi Bandi & Evelina Petrougaki
- First call-out: Nikol Tsoulos
- Featured photographer: Angelos Dristelas

=== Episode 10: Four Seasons Catwalk ===
Original airdate: 18 October 2022

- First call-out: Myria Kyriakidou
- Bottom two: Elena Lysandrou & Yeva Bondarénko
- Eliminated: Elena Lysandrou
- Featured photographer: Dimitris Kleanthous

=== Episode 11: Get The Job Done ===
Original airdate: 24 October 2022

- Quit: Alexia Kouvela & Nikol Tsoulos
- First call-out: Mikaela Novak-Marli
- Featured photographer: Marios Sagias

=== Episode 12: Fashion In The City ===
Original airdate: 25 October 2022

- First call-out: Yeva Bondarénko
- Bottom two: Despoina Sarri & Julia Iligenko
- Eliminated: Julia iligenko
- Featured photographer: George Angelis

=== Episode 13: The Makeover ===
Original airdate: 31 October 2022

The contestants received their makeovers. There was no panel held.

- Entered: Dorela Geka, Eirini Andoniou, Georgianna Ioakeimidou & Rafaela Charalambous
- Featured photographer: Panagiotis Katsos

=== Episode 14: Bikini Debate ===
Original airdate: 1 November 2022

- First call-out: Coty Gougousi-Camacho & Maria Costa
- Bottom two: Dorela Geka & Victoria Muroforidou
- Eliminated: Dorela Geka
- Featured photographer: Joey Leo

=== Episode 15: Back To The Future ===
Original airdate: 7 November 2022

- First call-out: Grigoriana Plyta
- Bottom two: Yeva Bondarénko & Zoe Ioannidou
- Eliminated: Yeva Bondarénko
- Featured Photographer: Olga Tzimou

=== Episode 16: Alive & Kicking ===
Original airdate: 8 November 2022

- First call-out: Victoria Muroforidou
- Bottom two: Despoina Sarri & Rafaela Charalambous
- Eliminated: Despoina Sarri
- Featured Photographer: Christos Theologou

=== Episode 17: Make Me Wet ===
Original airdate: 14 November 2022

- First call-out: Rafaela Charalambous
- Bottom two: Aléksia Trajko & Zoe Ioannidou
- Eliminated: Zoe Ioannidou
- Featured Photographer: Vaggelis Xafinis

=== Episode 18: Sail Away ===
Original airdate: 15 November 2022

- First call-out: Coty Gougousi-Camacho
- Bottom two: Katya Kizima & Maria Costa
- Eliminated: Katya Kizima
- Featured Photographer: Nikos Vardakastanis

=== Episode 19: Shine On ===
Original airdate: 21 November 2022

- First call-out: Mara Marli
- Bottom two: Eirini Andoniou & Rafaela Charalambous
- Eliminated: Rafaela Charalambous
- Featured Photographer: Panos Giannakopoulos

=== Episode 20: Dirty Ride ===
Original airdate: 22 November 2022

- First call-out: Myria Kyriakidou
- Bottom two: Maria Costa & Victoria Muroforidou
- Eliminated: Maria Costa
- Featured Photographer: Spyros Chamalis

=== Episode 21: Glam Wars ===
Original airdate: 28 November 2022

- First call-out: Marita Kathitzioti
- Bottom two: Eirini Andoniou & Victoria Muroforidou
- Eliminated: Eirini Andoniou
- Featured Photographer: Petros Toufexis

=== Episode 22: Recycle Queen ===
Original airdate: 29 November 2022

- First call-out: Myria Kyriakidou
- Bottom two: Grigoriana Plyta & Marita Kathitzioti
- Eliminated: Grigoriana Plyta
- Featured Photographer: Antonis Agridopoulos

=== Episode 23: Vamos Nammos ===
Original airdate: 5 December 2022

- First call-out: Mikaela Novak-Marli
- Bottom two: Georgianna Ioakeimidou & Mara Marli
- Eliminated: Georgianna Ioakeimidou
- Featured Photographers: Panagiotis Katsos, Apostolos Koukousas

=== Episode 24: The After Party Effect ===
Original airdate: 6 December 2022

- Returned: Katya Kizima & Rafaela Charalambous
- First call-out: Victoria Muroforidou
- Bottom two: Aléksia Trajko & Rafaela Charalambous
- Eliminated: Rafaela Charalambous
- Featured Photographer: Dimitris Kleanthous

=== Episode 25: Transparency ===
Original airdate: 12 December 2022

- First call-out: Coty Gougousi-Camacho
- Bottom two: Katya Kizima & Mara Marli
- Eliminated: Katya Kizima
- Featured Photographer: Panagiotis Simopoulos

=== Episode 26: Rich Girl & Her Strange Pet ===
Original airdate: 16 December 2022

- First call-out: Marita Kathitzioti
- Bottom two: Mikaela Novak-Marli & Victoria Muroforidou
- Eliminated: Mikaela Novak-Marli
- Featured Photographer: Aggelos Potamianos

=== Episode 27: Driver's Seat ===
Original airdate: 19 December 2022

- First call-out: Victoria Muroforidou
- Bottom two: Coty Gougousi-Camacho & Myria Kyriakidou
- Eliminated: Myria Kyriakidou
- Featured Photographer: Kosmas Koumianos

=== Episode 28: Trip To Rome ===
Original airdate: 20 December 2022

- First call-out: Marita Kathitzioti
- Bottom two: Mara Marli & Victoria Muroforidou
- Eliminated: Mara Marli
- Featured Photographers: Panagiotis Katsos, Stratis Kas

=== Episode 29: Catwalk, Cabaret - Final Part 1 ===
Original airdate: 21 December 2022

- Final four: Aleksia Traiko, Coty Gougousi-Camacho, Marita Kathitzioti & Victoria Muroforidou
- Injured: Coty Gougousi-Camacho
- Featured Photographer: Bill Georgousis

=== Episode 30: Video Clip - Final Part 2 ===
Original airdate: 23 December 2022

Scores
Nº	Model	Judges' scores					Public's score	Total Score
Nº	Model	#	Tasos	Vicky	Giorgos	Total	Public's score	Total Score
1	Marita	Catwalk	9	9	9	27	9	86
1	Marita	Photo	8	8	8	24	9	86
1	Marita	Video Clip	8	9	9	26	9	86
2	Victoria	Catwalk	9	8	8	25	4	82
2	Victoria	Photo	9	9	8	26	4	82
2	Victoria	Video Clip	9	9	9	27	4	82
3	Aléksia T.	Catwalk	8	8	7	23	17	94
3	Aléksia T.	Photo	9	8	10	27	17	94
3	Aléksia T.	Video Clip	9	8	10	27	17	94

- Final three: Aléksia Trajko, Marita Kathitzioti & Victoria Muroforidou
- Third place: Victoria Muroforidou
- Runner-up: Marita Kathitzioti
- Greece's Next Top Model: Aléksia Trajko

== Results ==
Order	Episodes																						
Order	7 (Note: In episode 7, Anna decided to withdraw from the competition and she was then replaced by Nagia.)	8 (Note: In episode 8, Katya was absent at the photoshoot for medical reasons but she was deemed safe.)	9 (Note: In episode 9, Evelina withdrew prior to the photoshoot. At panel, Efi decided to quit from the competition after landing in the bottom five leaving Alexia K., Katya, Maria, and Yeva automatically safe from elimination.)	10	11 (Note: In episode 11, Alexia K. withdrew prior to the photoshoot. At panel, Nikol decided to quit the competition before Vicky called her as 'first call-out'. The remainder of the cast was put through to the photoshoot collectively.)	12	14 (Note: In episode 13, Dorela, Eirini, Georgianna, and Rafaela were added into the competition by the judges due to many previous contestants withdrawing from the competition for personal reasons.)	15	16	17	18	19	20	21	22	23	24 (Note: In episode 24, Katya & Rafaela returned to the competition.)	25	26	27	28	29 (Note: In episode 29, Coty quit the competition because of a severe injury.)	30
1	Aléksia T.	Yeva	Nikol	Myria	Nikol	Yeva	Coty; Maria	Grigoriana	Victoria	Rafaela	Coty	Mara	Myria	Marita	Myria	Mikaela	Victoria	Coty	Marita	Victoria	Marita	Aléksia T. Marita; Victoria	Aléksia T.
2	Marita	Evelina	Despoina	Maria	Mikaela	Mikaela	Coty; Maria	Georgianna	Georgianna	Katya	Mara	Aléksia T.	Aléksia T.	Mikaela	Coty	Marita	Myria	Victoria	Coty	Mara	Coty	Aléksia T. Marita; Victoria	Marita
3	Mikaela	Mara	Aléksia T.	Grigoriana	Aléksia T. Coty; Despoina; Grigoriana; Katya; Mara; Maria; Marita; Myria; Tzoulia; Victoria; Yeva; Zoe	Coty	Despoina; Marita	Aléksia T.	Marita	Mara	Mikaela	Maria	Coty	Grigoriana	Victoria	Myria	Coty	Myria	Aléksia T.	Marita	Aléksia T.	Aléksia T. Marita; Victoria	Victoria
4	Victoria	Marita	Grigoriana	Aleksia K.	Aléksia T. Coty; Despoina; Grigoriana; Katya; Mara; Maria; Marita; Myria; Tzoulia; Victoria; Yeva; Zoe	Marita	Despoina; Marita	Mara	Grigoriana	Coty	Georgianna	Grigoriana	Grigoriana	Coty	Aléksia T.	Victoria	Mikaela	Marita	Myria	Aléksia T.	Victoria	Coty	
5	Nikol	Nikol	Marita	Nikol	Aléksia T. Coty; Despoina; Grigoriana; Katya; Mara; Maria; Marita; Myria; Tzoulia; Victoria; Yeva; Zoe	Myria	Georgianna; Mikaela	Katya	Aléksia T.	Eirini	Victoria	Myria	Georgianna	Aléksia T.	Mikaela	Aléksia T.	Katya	Aléksia T.	Mara	Coty	Mara		
6	Coty	Mikaela	Victoria	Aléksia T.	Aléksia T. Coty; Despoina; Grigoriana; Katya; Mara; Maria; Marita; Myria; Tzoulia; Victoria; Yeva; Zoe	Maria	Georgianna; Mikaela	Rafaela	Coty	Victoria	Myria	Coty	Eirini	Georgianna	Georgianna	Coty	Marita	Mikaela	Victoria	Myria			
7	Mara	Coty	Myria	Victoria	Aléksia T. Coty; Despoina; Grigoriana; Katya; Mara; Maria; Marita; Myria; Tzoulia; Victoria; Yeva; Zoe	Zoe	Grigoriana; Mara	Myria	Katya	Mikaela	Grigoriana	Mikaela	Mara	Myria	Mara	Mara	Mara	Mara	Mikaela				
8	Evelina	Efi	Mikaela	Mikaela	Aléksia T. Coty; Despoina; Grigoriana; Katya; Mara; Maria; Marita; Myria; Tzoulia; Victoria; Yeva; Zoe	Katya	Grigoriana; Mara	Marita	Maria	Georgianna	Rafaela	Victoria	Mikaela	Mara	Marita	Georgianna	Aléksia T.	Katya					
9	Yeva	Maria	Elena	Marita	Aléksia T. Coty; Despoina; Grigoriana; Katya; Mara; Maria; Marita; Myria; Tzoulia; Victoria; Yeva; Zoe	Victoria	Myria; Rafaela	Despoina	Mara	Marita	Eirini	Georgianna	Marita	Victoria	Grigoriana		Rafaela						
10	Grigoriana	Victoria	Zoe	Coty	Aléksia T. Coty; Despoina; Grigoriana; Katya; Mara; Maria; Marita; Myria; Tzoulia; Victoria; Yeva; Zoe	Mara	Myria; Rafaela	Victoria	Eirini	Grigoriana	Marita	Marita	Victoria	Eirini									
11	Zoe	Aléksia T.	Mara	Zoe	Aléksia T. Coty; Despoina; Grigoriana; Katya; Mara; Maria; Marita; Myria; Tzoulia; Victoria; Yeva; Zoe	Grigoriana	Eirini	Coty	Myria	Maria	Aléksia T.	Eirini	Maria										
12	Katya	Grigoriana	Tzoulia	Mara	Aléksia T. Coty; Despoina; Grigoriana; Katya; Mara; Maria; Marita; Myria; Tzoulia; Victoria; Yeva; Zoe	Aléksia T.	Aléksia T. Zoe	Mikaela	Mikaela	Myria	Maria	Rafaela											
13	Despoina	Aleksia K.	Coty	Katya	Aléksia T. Coty; Despoina; Grigoriana; Katya; Mara; Maria; Marita; Myria; Tzoulia; Victoria; Yeva; Zoe	Despoina	Aléksia T. Zoe	Maria	Zoe	Aléksia T.	Katya												
14	Maria	Myria	Efi	Despoina	Aléksia T. Coty; Despoina; Grigoriana; Katya; Mara; Maria; Marita; Myria; Tzoulia; Victoria; Yeva; Zoe	Tzoulia	Katya; Yeva	Eirini	Rafaela	Zoe													
15	Efi	Zoe	Aleksia K. Katya; Maria; Yeva	Tzoulia	Aléksia T. Coty; Despoina; Grigoriana; Katya; Mara; Maria; Marita; Myria; Tzoulia; Victoria; Yeva; Zoe		Katya; Yeva	Zoe	Despoina														
16	Elena	Elena	Aleksia K. Katya; Maria; Yeva	Yeva	Aleksia K.		Victoria	Yeva															
17	Tzoulia	Tzoulia	Aleksia K. Katya; Maria; Yeva	Elena			Dorela																
18	Nagia	Despoina	Aleksia K. Katya; Maria; Yeva																				
19	Aleksia K.	Nagia	Evelina																				
20	Myria	Katya																					
21	Katerina																						
22	Anna																						

The contestant quit the competition
The contestant was eliminated
The contestant was absent at panel but was deemed safe
The contestants were put through collectively to the next round
The contestant won the competition

=== Bottom two ===
Episode	Contestants	Eliminated
7	Katerina & Myria	Anna
7	Katerina & Myria	Katerina
8	Despoina & Nagia	Nagia
9	None	Evelina
9	None	Efi
10	Elena & Yeva	Elena
11	None	Aleksia K.
11	None	Nikol
12	Despoina & Tzoulia	Tzoulia
14	Dorela & Victoria	Dorela
15	Yeva & Zoe	Yeva
16	Despoina & Rafaela	Despoina
17	Aléksia T. & Zoe	Zoe
18	Katya & Maria	Katya
19	Eirini & Rafaela	Rafaela
20	Maria & Victoria	Maria
21	Eirini & Victoria	Eirini
22	Grigoriana & Marita	Grigoriana
23	Georgianna & Mara	Georgianna
24	Aléksia T. & Rafaela	Rafaela
25	Katya & Mara	Katya
26	Mikaela & Victoria	Mikaela
27	Coty & Myria	Myria
28	Mara & Victoria	Mara
29	None	Coty
30	Aléksia T., Marita & Victoria	
30	Aléksia T., Marita & Victoria	Victoria
30	Aléksia T., Marita & Victoria	Marita

The contestant quit the competition
The contestant was eliminated after their first time in the bottom two
The contestant was eliminated after their second time in the bottom two
The contestant was eliminated after their third time in the bottom two
The contestant Quit the competition due to an injury
The contestant was eliminated in the final judging and placed third
The contestant was eliminated in the final judging and placed as the runner-up

=== Average call-out order ===
Episode 11 (except top two), 13, 29 & 30 are not included.

Rank by average	Place	Model	Call-out total	Number of call-outs	Call-out average
1	19	Nikol	17	5	3.40
2	4	Coty	96	20	4.80
3	23	Evelina	10	2	5.00
4	2	Marita	102	20	5.10
5	10	Georgianna	55	10	5.50
6	7	Mikaela	108	19	5.68
7	1	Aléksia T.	118	20	5.90
8	3	Victoria	122	20	6.10
9	5	Mara	124	20	6.20
10	11	Grigoriana	89	14	6.36
11	6	Myria	124	19	6.53
12	9	Rafaela	58	7	8.29
13	13	Maria	105	12	8.75
14	8	Katya	102	11	9.27
15	12	Eirini	76	8	9.50
16	16	Yeva	72	7	10.29
17	15	Despoina	87	8	10.88
18	22	Efi	22	2	11.00
19	14	Zoe	108	9	12.00
20	20	Alexia K.	53	4	13.25
21	21	Elena	58	4	14.50
22	18	Julia	75	5	15.00
23	17	Dorela	17	1	17.00
24	24	Nagia	37	3	18.50
25	25	Katerina	21	1	21.00
26	26	Anna	-	-	-

== Photo shoots ==
- Episode 6 photo shoot: Posing with a treadmill in lingerie (semifinals)
- Episode 7 photo shoot: Wuthering Heights
- Episode 8 photo shoot: Drive-Thru Diner
- Episode 9 photo shoot: Tennis
- Episode 10 photo shoot: Four Seasons Catwalk
- Episode 11 photo shoot: Get The Job Done
- Episode 12 photo shoot: Fashion In The City
- Episode 13 photo shoot: The Makeover
- Episode 14 photo shoot: Bikini Debate
- Episode 15 photo shoot: Back To The Future
- Episode 16 photo shoot: Alive & Kicking
- Episode 17 photo shoot: Make Me wet
- Episode 18 photo shoot: Sail Away
- Episode 19 photo shoot: Shine On
- Episode 20 photo shoot: Dirty Ride
- Episode 21 photo shoot: Glam Wars
- Episode 22 photo shoot: Recycle Queen
- Episode 23 photo shoot: Vamos Nammos
- Episode 24 photo shoot: The After Party Effect
- Episode 25 photo shoot: Transparency
- Episode 26 photo shoot: Rich Girl & Her Strange Pet
- Episode 27 photo shoot: Driver's Seat
- Episode 28 photo shoot: Trip To Rome
- Episode 29 photo shoot: Cabaret
- Episode 30 commercial: Dust & Cream crimson lipstick

== Ratings ==
No. in series	No. in season	Episode	Air date	Timeslot (EET)	Ratings	Viewers (in millions)	Rank		Share		Source
No. in series	No. in season	Episode	Air date	Timeslot (EET)	Ratings	Viewers (in millions)	Daily	Weekly	Household	Adults 18-54	Source
157	1	"Auditions, Part 1"	September 19, 2022	Monday 9:00pm	4,9%	0,496	#4	—N/a^{1}	12,7%	17,6%	
158	2	"Auditions, Part 2"	September 20, 2022	Tuesday 9:00pm	6,0%	0,604	#4	—N/a^{1}	15,9%	20,7%	
159	3	"Auditions, Part 3"	September 26, 2022	Monday 9:00pm	5,7%	0,573	#4	—N/a^{1}	14,2%	20,3%	
160	4	"Auditions, Part 4"	September 27, 2022	Tuesday 9:00pm	5,7%	0,572	#5	—N/a^{1}	14,1%	20,2%	
161	5	"Auditions, Part 5 - Bootcamp: ID catwalk"	October 3, 2022	Monday 9:00pm	5,3%	0,532	#6	—N/a^{1}	13,1%	18,5%	
162	6	"Bootcamp: Photoshoot"	October 4, 2022	Tuesday 9:00pm	4,2%	0,428	#10	—N/a^{1}	10.9%	15.5%	
163	7	"Wuthering Heights"	October 10, 2022	Monday 9:00pm	—N/a^{2}			—N/a^{1}	9.9%	13.9%	
164	8	"Drive-through Diner"	October 11, 2022	Tuesday 9:00pm	—N/a^{2}			—N/a^{1}	10.7%	15.3%	
165	9	"Tennis"	October 17, 2022	Monday 9:00pm	—N/a^{2}			—N/a^{1}	8.9%	13,3%	
166	10	"4 Seasons Catwalk"	October 18, 2022	Tuesday 9:00pm	—N/a^{2}			—N/a^{1}	9.5%	13,4%	
167	11	"Get The Job Done"	October 24, 2022	Monday 9:00pm	—N/a^{2}			—N/a^{1}	8.7%	11,6%	
168	12	"Fashion In The City"	October 25, 2022	Tuesday 9:00pm	—N/a^{2}			—N/a^{1}	8.6%	12,7%	
169	13	"The Makeover"	October 31, 2022	Monday 9:00pm	—N/a^{2}			—N/a^{1}	9.5%	14,0%	
170	14	"Bikini Debate"	November 1, 2022	Tuesday 9:00pm	—N/a^{2}			—N/a^{1}	9.2%	12,9%	
171	15	"Back To The Future"	November 7, 2022	Monday 9:00pm	—N/a^{2}			—N/a^{1}	8.5%	12,3%	
172	16	"Alive & Kicking"	November 8, 2022	Tuesday 9:00pm	—N/a^{2}			—N/a^{1}	7.2%	9,8%	
173	17	"Make Me Wet"	November 14, 2022	Monday 9:00pm	—N/a^{2}			—N/a^{1}	9.2%	11,9%	
174	18	"Sail Away"	November 15, 2022	Tuesday 9:00pm	—N/a^{2}			—N/a^{1}	8.1%	10,7%	
175	19	"Shine On"	November 21, 2022	Monday 9:00pm	—N/a^{2}			—N/a^{1}	10.0%	13,5%	
176	20	"Dirty Ride"	November 22, 2022	Tuesday 9:00pm	—N/a^{2}			—N/a^{1}	9.0%	11,1%	
177	21	"Glam Wars"	November 28, 2022	Monday 9:00pm	—N/a^{2}			—N/a^{1}	8.5%	11,4%	
178	22	"Recycle Queen"	November 29, 2022	Tuesday 9:00pm	—N/a^{2}			—N/a^{1}	7.8%	10,9%	
179	23	"Vamos Nammos"	December 5, 2022	Monday 9:00pm	—N/a^{2}			—N/a^{1}	8.0%	10,6%	
180	24	"The After Party Effect"	December 6, 2022	Tuesday 9:00pm	—N/a^{2}			—N/a^{1}	6.7%	8,4%	
181	25	"Transparency"	December 12, 2022	Monday 9:00pm	—N/a^{2}			—N/a^{1}	8.4%	11,7%	
182	26	"Rich Girl & Her Strange Pet"	December 16, 2022	Friday 9:00pm	—N/a^{2}			—N/a^{1}	7.9%	9,0%	
183	27	"Driver's Seat"	December 19, 2022	Monday 9:00pm	—N/a^{2}			—N/a^{1}	6.0%	7,5%	
184	28	"Trip To Rome"	December 20, 2022	Tuesday 9:00pm	—N/a^{2}			—N/a^{1}	10.2%	12,7%	
185	29	"Catwalk, Cabaret"	December 21, 2022	Wednesday 9:00pm	—N/a^{2}			—N/a^{1}	7.0%	9,4%	
186	30	"Video Clip"	December 23, 2022	Friday 9:00pm	—N/a^{2}			—N/a^{1}	11.4%	15,0%	

Notes

1. Outside top 20.
2. Outside top 10.
