= Greece's Next Top Model season 6 =

Greece's Next Top Model
- Season 6
- Judges: Angelos Bratis; Eddie Gavrielides; Genevieve Majari; Iliana Papageorgiou; Laki Gavalas
- No. of contestants: 19
- Winner: Xenia Tsirkova
- No. of episodes: 18

Release
- Original network: Star Channel
- Original release: September 19 – December 19, 2025

Season chronology
- ← Previous; Season 5

The sixth season of Greece's Next Top Model (abbreviated as GNTMgr, also known as Greece's Next Top Model: Boys & Girls) premiered on September 19, 2025, on Star Channel. This season marks the return of also featuring male contestants.

The prizes for this season included a scholarship for studies in a specialty of their choice, from the ALFA Higher Education Schools, an OMODA 5 EV electric car in the rich Premium version and a cash prize of €50,000.

The winner of the competition was 25-year-old Xenia Tsirkova from Athens.

== Cast ==
=== Contestants ===
(Ages stated are at start of contest)

Contestant	Age	Height	Hometown	Finish	Place
Xristina Perouli	20	1.68 m (5 ft 6 in)	Corfu	Episode 5	19
Nikos Triantafyllou	22	1.86 m (6 ft 1 in)	Athens	Episode 6	18
Milena Adupa	22	1.74 m (5 ft 8 1/2 in)	Athens	Episode 7	17
Angelika Kyrou	20	1.65 m (5 ft 5 in)	Corfu	Episode 8	16
Michalis Migklis	20	1.83 m (6 ft 0 in)	Karystos	Episode 9	15
Savvas Tavoultsidis	22	1.87 m (6 ft 1 1/2 in)	Ludwigsburg, Germany	Episode 10	14-13
Yasmin Frey	21	1.72 m (5 ft 7 1/2 in)	Zakynthos	Episode 10	14-13
Anastasio Darlagiannis	20	1.85 m (6 ft 1 in)	Katerini	Episode 11	12
Narcissus Tzilopoulos	21	1.96 m (6 ft 5 in)	Alexandreia	Episode 12	11
Eleni Orkopoulou	23	1.80 m (5 ft 11 in)	Thessaloniki	Episode 13	10
Anna Michailidou	21	1.79 m (5 ft 10 1/2 in)	Thessaloniki	Episode 14	9
Michaela Kravarik	28	1.78 m (5 ft 10 in)	Thessaloniki	Episode 15	8
Edouardo Tedeski	20	1.84 m (6 ft 1/2 in)	Athens	Episode 16	7
Michalis Koutris	19	1.85 m (6 ft 1 in)	Nafplio	Episode 17	6-5
Rafailia Zigiridi	22	1.74 m (5 ft 8 1/2 in)	Thessaloniki	Episode 17	6-5
Eirini Vasiliadou	20	1.74 m (5 ft 8 1/2 in)	Makrochori	Episode 18	4
Giorgos Tokmetzidis	24	1.85 m (6 ft 1 in)	Athens	Episode 18	3
Anestis Tedeski	23	1.89 m (6 ft 2 1/2 in)	Athens	Episode 18	2
Ksenia 'Xenia' Tsirkova	25	1.78 m (5 ft 10 in)	Athens	Episode 18	1

=== Host ===
Iliana Papageorgiou

=== Judges ===
- Angelos Bratis
- Eddie Gavriilidis
- Laki Gavalas

=== Other cast members ===
- Laki Gavalas - Fashion Consultant
- Genevieve Majari – art director

== Episode summaries ==
=== Episode 5 ===
Original airdate: 17 October 2025

- Challenge winner: Xenia Tsirkova
- First call-out: Anestis Tedeski
- Bottom three: Angelika Kyrou, Rafailia Zigiridi & Xristina Perouli
- Eliminated: Xristina Perouli
- Featured photographer:

=== Episode 6 ===
Original airdate: 24 October 2025

- Challenge winner: Anestis Tedeski
- First call-out: Eirini Vasiliadou
- Bottom three: Angelika Kyrou, Anna Michailidou & Nikos Triantafyllou
- Eliminated: Nikos Triantafyllou
- Featured photographer: Kosmas Koumianos

=== Episode 7 ===
Original airdate: 31 October 2025

- First call-out: Edouardo Tedeski
- Bottom three: Eleni Orkopoulou, Michalis Migklis & Milena Adupa
- Eliminated: Milena Adupa

=== Episode 8 ===
Original airdate: 7 November 2025

- Challenge winner: Anastasio Darlagiannis
- First call-out: Michaela Kravarik
- Bottom three: Angelika Kyrou, Narcissus Tzilopoulos & Rafailia Zigiridi
- Eliminated: Angelika Kyrou

=== Episode 9 ===
Original airdate: 14 November 2025

- First call-out: Xenia Tsirkova
- Bottom three: Anna Michailidou, Yasmin Frey & Michalis Migklis
- Eliminated: Michalis Migklis

=== Episode 10 ===
Original airdate: 21 November 2025

- Challenge winner: Anestis Tedeski
- First call-outs: Eirini Vasiliadou & Giorgos Tokmetzidis
- Bottom four: Yasmin Frey, Michaela Kravarik, Narcissus Tzilopoulos & Savvas Tavoultsidis
- Eliminated: Yasmin Frey & Savvas Tavoultsidis
- Featured photographer: Pantelis Hadoulis

=== Episode 11 ===
Original airdate: 28 November 2025

- First call-out: Anna Michailidou
- Bottom three: Anastasio Darlagiannis, Edouardo Tedeski & Eleni Orkopoulou
- Eliminated: Anastasio Darlagiannis
- Featured photographer: Aggelos Dristelas

=== Episode 12 ===
Original airdate: 3 December 2025

- Challenge winner: Narcissus Tzilopoulos
- First call-outs: Giorgos Tokmetzidis
- Bottom three: Edouardo Tedeski, Narcissus Tzilopoulos & Rafailia Zigiridi
- Eliminated: Narcissus Tzilopoulos
- Featured photographer: Spiros Hamalis

=== Episode 13 ===
Original airdate: 5 December 2025

- Challenge winner/Immunity: Rafailia Zigiridi
- First call-out: Michalis Koutris
- Bottom three: Eleni Orkopoulou, Eirini Vasiliadou & Michaela Kravarik
- Eliminated: Eleni Orkopoulou
- Featured photographer: Ioanna Tzetzoumi

=== Episode 14 ===
Original airdate: 10 December 2025

- Challenge winner: Xenia Tsirkova
- First call-out: Anestis Tedeski
- Bottom three: Anna Michailidou, Michaela Kravarik & Michalis Koutris
- Eliminated: Anna Michailidou
- Featured photographer: Freddie F

=== Episode 15 ===
Original airdate: 12 December 2025

- First call-out: Eirini Vasiliadou
- Bottom three: Edouardo Tedeski, Michaela Kravarik & Michalis Koutris
- Eliminated: Michaela Kravarik
- Featured photographer: Panos Giannakopoulos

=== Episode 16 ===
Original airdate: 17 December 2025

- Challenge winner: Xenia Tsirkova
- First call-out: Anestis Tedeski
- Bottom three: Edouardo Tedeski, Michalis Koutris & Xenia Tsirkova
- Eliminated: Edouardo Tedeski
- Guest judge: Betty Maggira
- Featured photographer: Katerina Tsatsani

=== Episode 17 ===
Original airdate: 18 December 2025

- Bottom three: Giorgos Tokmetzidis, Michalis Koutris & Rafailia Zigiridi
- Eliminated: Michalis Koutris & Rafailia Zigiridi
- Featured photographer: Apostolis Koukousas

=== Episode 18 ===
Original airdate: 19 December 2025

- Final four: Anestis Tedeski, Eirini Vasiliadou, Giorgos Tokmetzidis & Xenia Tsirkova
- Eliminated: Eirini Vasiliadou
- Featured Photographer: Bill Georgoussis

Scores
Nº	Model	Judges' scores							Public's score	Total Score
Nº	Model	#	Iliana	Lakis	Eddie	Genevieve	Angelos	Total	Public's score	Total Score
1	Anestis	Glam Chandelier	8	10	9	9	8	44	25	114
1	Anestis	Jewelry in Bath tub	9	9	9	9	9	45	25	114
2	Giorgos	Glam Chandelier	8	9	8	9	9	43	13	103
2	Giorgos	Jewelry in Bath tub	10	9	10	8	10	47	13	103
3	Xenia	Glam Chandelier	9	8	9	9	9	44	23	116
3	Xenia	Jewelry in Bath tub	10	10	10	10	9	49	23	116

- Final three: Anestis Tedeski, Giorgos Tokmetzidis & Xenia Tsirkova
- Third place: Giorgos Tokmetzidis
- Runner-up: Anestis Tedeski
- Greece's Next Top Model: Xenia Tsirkova

== Results ==
Order	Episodes														
Order	5	6	7	8	9	10	11	12	13	14	15	16	17 (Note: In episode 17, the first three finalists were called forward in random order.)	18	
1	Anestis	Eirini	Edouardo	Michaela	Xenia	Eirini; Giorgos	Anna	Giorgos	Michalis K.	Anestis	Eirini	Anestis	Anestis; Eirini; Xenia	Anestis	Xenia
2	Michalis M.	Rafailia	Anna	Edouardo	Michaela	Eirini; Giorgos	Xenia	Anestis	Xenia	Giorgos	Rafailia	Eirini	Anestis; Eirini; Xenia	Xenia	Anestis
3	Yasmin	Edouardo	Savvas	Xenia	Edouardo	Michalis K. Rafailia	Michaela	Eirini	Anna	Xenia	Giorgos	Rafailia	Anestis; Eirini; Xenia	Giorgos	Giorgos
4	Giorgos	Michaela	Michaela	Anna	Giorgos	Michalis K. Rafailia	Rafailia	Michaela	Rafailia	Rafailia	Anestis	Giorgos	Giorgos	Eirini	
5	Anna	Xenia	Eirini	Michalis K.	Eleni	Anna; Anestis	Eirini	Eleni	Edouardo	Edouardo	Xenia	Michalis K.	Michalis K. Rafailia		
6	Anastasio	Yasmin	Michalis K.	Anestis	Eirini	Anna; Anestis	Giorgos	Anna	Anestis	Eirini	Michalis K.	Xenia	Michalis K. Rafailia		
7	Nikos	Anastasio	Rafailia	Giorgos	Rafailia	Edouardo; Eleni	Michalis K.	Xenia	Giorgos	Michalis K.	Edouardo	Edouardo			
8	Savvas	Giorgos	Xenia	Savvas	Anestis	Edouardo; Eleni	Narcissus	Michalis K.	Eirini	Michaela	Michaela				
9	Michaela	Anestis	Narcissus	Eirini	Anastasio	Anastasio; Xenia	Anestis	Edouardo	Michaela	Anna					
10	Michalis K.	Milena	Angelika	Michalis M.	Savvas	Anastasio; Xenia	Edouardo	Rafailia	Eleni						
11	Edouardo	Narcissus	Anestis	Anastasio	Narcissus	Michaela; Narcissus	Eleni	Narcissus							
12	Eleni	Michalis M.	Yasmin	Yasmin	Michalis K.	Michaela; Narcissus	Anastasio								
13	Xenia	Michalis K.	Giorgos	Eleni	Anna	Yasmin; Savvas									
14	Narcissus	Eleni	Anastasio	Narcissus	Yasmin	Yasmin; Savvas									
15	Milena	Savvas	Michalis M.	Rafailia	Michalis M.										
16	Eirini	Angelika	Eleni	Angelika											
17	Angelika	Anna	Milena												
18	Rafailia	Nikos													
19	Xristina														

The contestant was immune from elimination.
The contestant won the challenge.
The contestant was originally eliminated but was saved.
The contestant quit the competition
The contestant was eliminated outside of judging panel
The contestant was eliminated.

== Photo shoots ==
- Episode 5 photo shoot: Mission Impossible
- Episode 6 photo shoot: Flash Dance
- Episode 7 photo shoot: The Golden Executive
- Episode 8 photo shoot: Farm Life
- Episode 9 photo shoot: Red Lights
- Episode 10 photo shoot: One Breath
- Episode 11 photo shoot: The Twelve Olympians
- Episode 12 photo shoot: Ride the Wave, Ride the Car
- Episode 13 photo shoot: Duel of Style and Speed
- Episode 14 photo shoot: Summer Resort for Sensodyne
- Episode 15 photo shoots: Lord of the Carpet / Jewelries Beauty Shoot
- Episode 16 photo shoot: Fashion Victims for Pantene
- Episode 17 photo shoot: The Big Party
- Episode 18 photo shoots: Glam Chandelier / Jewelries in Bath Tub

== Ratings ==
No. in series	No. in season	Episode	Air date	Timeslot (EET)	Ratings	Viewers (in millions)	Rank		Share		Source
No. in series	No. in season	Episode	Air date	Timeslot (EET)	Ratings	Viewers (in millions)	Daily	Weekly	Household	Adults 18-54	Source
187	1	"Episode 1: Audition"	September 19, 2025	Friday 9:00pm	4,7%	0,474	#1	#8	12,9%	14,8%	
188	2	"Episode 2: Audition"	September 26, 2025	Friday 9:00pm	4,1%	0,414	#3	—N/a^{1}	11,2%	12,8%	
189	3	"Episode 3: Audition"	October 3, 2025	Friday 9:00pm	—N/a^{2}			—N/a^{1}	8,3%	10,6%	
190	4	"Episode 4: Bootcamp"	October 10, 2025	Friday 9:00pm	—N/a^{2}			—N/a^{1}	9,3%	12,7%	
191	5	"Episode 5"	October 17, 2025	Friday 9:00pm	—N/a^{2}			—N/a^{1}	11,0%	15,2%	
192	6	"Episode 6"	October 24, 2025	Friday 9:00pm	—N/a^{2}			—N/a^{1}		14.2%	
193	7	"Episode 7"	October 31, 2025	Friday 9:00pm	—N/a^{2}			—N/a^{1}	9,4%	12,7%	
194	8	"Episode 8"	November 7, 2025	Friday 9:00pm	—N/a^{2}			—N/a^{1}	9,2%	11,7%	
195	9	"Episode 9"	November 14, 2025	Friday 9:00pm	—N/a^{2}			—N/a^{1}	8,9%	12,0%	
196	10	"Episode 10"	November 21, 2025	Friday 9:00pm	—N/a^{2}			—N/a^{1}	8,1%	11,2%	
197	11	"Episode 11"	November 28, 2025	Friday 9:00pm	—N/a^{2}			—N/a^{1}	7,8%	9,7%	
198	12	"Episode 12"	December 3, 2025	Wednesday 9:00pm	—N/a^{2}			—N/a^{1}	7,7%	10,4%	
199	13	"Episode 13"	December 5, 2025	Friday 9:00pm	—N/a^{2}			—N/a^{1}	8,5%	10,7%	
200	14	"Episode 14"	December 10, 2025	Wednesday 9:00pm	—N/a^{2}			—N/a^{1}	8,4%	9,9%	
201	15	"Episode 15"	December 12, 2025	Friday 9:00pm	—N/a^{2}			—N/a^{1}	9,2%	10,6%	
202	16	"Episode 16"	December 17, 2025	Wednesday 9:00pm	—N/a^{2}			—N/a^{1}	8,2%	11,1%	
203	17	"Episode 17"	December 18, 2025	Thursday 9:00pm	—N/a^{2}			—N/a^{1}	7,7%	9,9%	
204	18	"Episode 18"	December 19, 2025	Friday 9:00pm	4,3%	0,429	#10	—N/a^{1}	11,7%	11,7%	

Notes

1. Outside top 20.
2. Outside top 10.
