= Greece's Next Top Model =

- Also known as: GNTMgr
- Genre: Reality television
- Created by: Tyra Banks
- Presented by: Iliana Papageorgiou (Season 7–)
- Judges: Vicky Kaya; Dimitris Skoulos; Angelos Bratis; Iliana Papageorgiou; Genevieve Majari; Ismini Papavlasopoulou; George Karavas; Tassos Sofroniou; Sophia Hadjipanteli; Lakis Gavalas; Eddie Gavriilidis; Betty Maggira
- Opening theme: Wanna Be On Top?
- Ending theme: Wanna Be On Top?
- Country of origin: Greece
- No. of seasons: 7
- No. of episodes: 186

Production
- Executive producer: Savvas Vellas
- Running time: 180 minutes (150 without commercials)

Original release
- Network: Star Channel
- Release: 10 September 2018 – present

Greece's Next Top Model is a Greek reality television series of the Next Top Model franchise. It is the second Greek iteration after Next Top Model. Four judges are the head of the search for the contestants. The basic premise of the series is a group of young contestants who live together in a house for several weeks while taking part in various challenges, photo shoots and meetings with members of the modeling industry. Normally, one poor-performing contestant is eliminated each week until the last contestant remaining is declared "Greece's Next Top Model" and receives a modeling contract along with other associated prizes.

In May 2018, it was announced that Star Channel was in talks with Vicky Kaya to revive the series for a new season. In June 2018, it was announced the new season is scheduled to premiere in October 2018 with Vicky Kaya returning not as a host but only as a judge alongside three new judges, Dimitris Skoulos, a fashion photographer, Angelos Bratis, a fashion designer, and Iliana Papageorgiou, a fashion/runway model. The first series premiered on September 10, 2018. Following its success, a two season with the same judges and the same format premiered on September 8, 2019. The show will return for a three season on the same channel in September 2020, with a change in the jury but also in the format. Genevieve Majari will replace Papageorgiou as the new judge. On April 15, 2021, Star Channel announced that after 3 seasons, Vicky Kaya will not be returning for the fourth season. On May 19, 2021, it was announced that model Ismini Papavlasopoulou, is the new judge in the fourth season, replacing Kaya. In December 2024, it was announced that the sixth season will begin airing in 2025 on Star Channel.

Seasons 1-2 and 5 each consisted of a cast of 20–26 female contestants. Seasons 3-4 and 6-7, the show featured both female and male contestants.

== Judges and other staff members ==
Cast	Seasons						
Cast	1 (2018)	2 (2019)	3 (2020)	4 (2021)	5 (2022)	6 (2025)	7 (2026)
Hosts
Iliana Papageorgiou							Main
Judging panelists
Vicky Kaya	Main	Main	Main		Main		
Angelos Bratis	Main	Main	Main	Main		Main	Main
Dimitris Skoulos	Main	Main	Main	Main			
Iliana Papageorgiou	Main	Main				Main	Main
Genevieve Majari			Main	Main		Guest	
Ismini Papavlasopoulou				Main			
George Karavas					Main		
Tassos Sofroniou					Main		
Sophia Hadjipanteli					Guest		
Lakis Gavalas						Main	Main
Eddie Gavriilidis						Main	
Betty Maggira							Main
Art director
Genevieve Majari	Main	Main	Main	Main		Main	Main
Panagiotis Katsos					Main		
Mentor
Elena Christopoulou	Main	Main					
George Karavas			Main	Main			
Christos Birbas					Main		
Model Instructor
Mary Vitinaros					Main		
Beauty Director
Manos Katrinis						Main	
Fashion Stylist
Vina Neofotistou						Main	

== Cycles ==
Cycle	Premiere date	Winner	Runner-up	Other contestants in order of elimination	Number of contestants	International Destinations
1	10 September 2018	Noune Kazaryan	Evelina Skichko	Sofia Zachariadou, Ioanna Desylla, Katerina Visseri, Marianna Mantesi, Garifallia Kalifoni (quit) & Elena Kalliontzi, Meggy Ndrio, Rozana Koutsoukou, Eirini Sterianou, Ioanna Sarri, Christianna Skoura, Xanthi Jeferou (quit), Agapi Olagbegi, Mikaela Fotiadis, Anna Tsakouridou, Elda Laska & Eirini Ermidou, Evi Ioannidou, Anna Amanatidou, Marianna Painesi	22	None
2	8 September 2019	Anna Maria Iliadou & Katya Tarabanko	Keisi Mizhiu	Katerina Peftitsi, Argyro Maglari, Silia Evangelou, Lydia Katsanikaki, Ioanna Kyritsi, Gloria Deniki, Nina Tzivanidou, Martina Khafichuk (quit), Olga Kalogirou, Suzanna Cuol, Spyroula Kaizer, Marina Grigoriou, Emmanuela Maina, Asimina Charitou, Eleftheria Karnava, Konstantina Florou & Popi Galetsa, Ilda Kroni, Anna Hadji, Hara Pappa, Maria Michalopoulou	24	Milan
3	7 September 2020	Hercules Tsuzinov	Paraskevi Kerasioti	Chrysa Kavraki, Alexandra Exarchopoulou, Panagiotis Petsas, Irida Papoutsi, Eirini Mitrakou, Konstantinos Tsentolini, Theodora Rachel, Panagiotis Antonopoulos, Sifis Faradakis, Marinela Zyla, Emmanuel Elozieoua, Dimosthenes Tzoumanis, Liia Chuzhdan, Xenia Motskalidou, Mariagapi Xypolia, Edward Stergiou, Emiliano Markou, Andreas Athanasopoulos	20	None
4	12 September 2021	Kyveli Hatziefstratiou	Olga Ntalla	Stella Papadopoulou, Ilias Aikaterinaris, Melina Rohrens (quit), Raphaela Rodinou, Thodoris Tsarouhas, Vasilis Parotidis (quit), Anna Valtatzi, Emilianos Klaudianos, Giannis Boutos, Ioanna Fragoulidou, Thanos Dimitriou, Dinos Kritsis, Maria Koumara, Stylianos Floridis, Napoleon Marios Mitsis, Agapi Brooks, Aggaios Pothitos, Eirini Lempesi, Konstantinos Tsagaris	21	None
5	19 September 2022	Aléksia Traiko	Marita Moggol Kathijotes	Anna Venetsaki (quit), Katerina Kara, Nagia Kontostergiou, Evelina Petrougaki (quit), Efi Bandi (quit), Elena Lysandrou, Aleksia Kouvela (quit), Nikol Tsoulos (quit), Tzoulia Iligenko, Dorela Geka, Yeva Bondarénko, Despoina Sarri, Zoe Ioannidou, Maria Costa, Eirini Andoniou, Grigoriana Plyta, Georgianna Ioakeimidou, Rafaela Charalambous, Katya Kizima, Mikaela Novak-Marli, Myria Kyriakidou, Mara Marli, Coty Gougousi-Camacho (quit), Victoria Muroforidou	26	Rome
6	19 September 2025	Xenia Tsirkova	Anestis Tedeski	Xristina Perouli, Nikos Triantafyllou, Milena Adypa, Angelika Kýrou, Michalis Migklis, Savvas Tavoultsidis & Giasmin Frey, Anastasio Darlagiannis, Narcissus Tzilopoulos, Eleni Orkopoulou, Anna Michailidou, Michaela Kravarik, Edouardo Tedeski, Rafailia Zigiridi & Michalis Koutris, Eirini Vasiliadou, Giorgos Tokmetzidis	19	None
7	21 September 2026	TBA	TBA	Stavros Martaras & Marietta Darzenta, Marinela Bici & Chris Papachristos, Nikodimos Novakovits, Anthi Manologlou, Panagiota Bougéli, Giorgos Polionis, Manos Tzampazakis, Nikolozi Gugunashvili, Stavroula Mavromati (quit), Chrusanthos Chrusanthopoulos, Fotini Karamitsiou, Christos Koutoulas; Still in the running: Akyllas Mourikis, Anastazja Krawczyńska, Anna Sacheri, Giannis Mavrodontis, Jean Maro, Karolina Kloss, Sofia Dimopoulou, Stavroula Halkia	22	TBA
