= Maria Psilou =

Greek model (born 1997)

- Born: Maria Psilou; 7 February 1997 (age 29); Aigio, Greece
- Height: 5 ft 10 in (178 cm)
- Beauty pageant titleholder
- Title: Star Hellas 2017
- Hair color: Blonde
- Eye color: Green
- Major competitions: Miss World 2017 (Unplaced); Miss Supranational 2018 (Unplaced)

Maria Psilou (Greek: Μαρία Ψηλού) (born 7 February 1997) is a Greek model and beauty pageant titleholder who was crowned Star Hellas 2017 and represented Greece at Miss World 2017 and Miss Supranational 2018 pageant.

== Personal life ==
Psilou hails from Aigio, Greece. She studied philosophy at the University of Patras. On 11 June 2020 Psilou married Greek entrepreneur Konstantinos Psilos. On 10 August 2020 she gave birth to their first child, a daughter.

== Pageantry ==
=== Star Hellas 2017 ===
Psilou was crowned Star Hellas 2017 and then competed at Miss World 2017.

=== Miss World 2017 ===
Psilou represented Greece at Miss World 2017 but Unplaced.

=== Miss Supranational 2018 ===
Psilou also represented Greece at Miss Supranational 2018 pageant in Poland.

Awards and achievements
Preceded by Mikaela Fotiadis	Star Hellas; 2017	Succeeded by Ioanna Bella
