= Mikaela Fotiadis =

Greek–Dutch model (born 1993)

Mikaela Fotiadi
- Born: Mikaela Eleni Fotiadi; 26 December 1993 (age 32); Haarlem, Netherlands
- Height: 1.78 m (5 ft 10 in)
- Children: 1
- Beauty pageant titleholder
- Title: Star Hellas 2015; Miss Europe 2016; Miss Tourism Planet 2013 (Winner); Star Hellas 2012 (Unplaced); Star Hellas 2015 (Winner); Miss Universe 2015 (Unplaced); Miss Worlds Next Top Model 2015 (1st runner up); Miss Europe World 2016 (Winner)
- Major competition: Miss Crete 2011 (Winner Miss Young)

Mica (Mikaela) Eleni Fotiadi (greek: Μικαέλα Ελένη Φωτιάδη, born 26 December 1993) is a Greek-Dutch model and beauty pageant titleholder. In 2015 she was crowned Star Hellas and represented her country at the Miss Universe 2015 in Las Vegas. In 2016 she was crowned Miss Europe World in Lebanon.

== Early life ==
Fotiadi was born on 26 December 1993, in Haarlem, Netherlands to Giorgos Fotiadis and Cathy Burger. Her father is Greek and her mother is Dutch. She has three siblings: Daniella (born 1991), Alexandra (born 1997) and Mercurios (born 2004). In 2002, She moved with her family to Crete, Greece.

== Career ==
At the age of 18, Fotiadi took part at "Star Hellas - Miss Hellas" beauty pageant but was unplaced. In 2013, she won the title of Miss Worldwide Tourism and began to work as a model.

In 2015, Fotiadi took part again at "Star Hellas - Miss Hellas" pageant and she won the first title. After that, represented Greece at the Miss Universe beauty pageant in Las Vegas. Also, she did a campaign for the Turkish clothing line "25th Hour" by Seda Oturan.

In 2016, Fotiadi was crowned Miss Europe in Lebanon and after that, she began a collaboration with Lebanese company "Savanah Cosmetics". Also, she took part for first time on Greek fashion show "MadWalk - The Fashion Music Project" with the designer Celia Kritharioti. In 2017, Fotiadi took part for second time on "MadWalk - The Fashion Music Project" in a collaboration with clothing line "MED Luxurious".

Fotiadi walked many times in catwalk of Athens Exclusive (Greek Fashion Week) for designers such as Nella Ioannou, Panos Apergis, Chris Stratikopoulos, Kathy Heyndels, Makis Tselios etc.

In 2018, Fotiadi was a contestant on Greece's Next Top Model, where she was eliminated in the twenty-third episode. She was placed 9th overall. On 12 January 2019 Fotiadi walked in catwalk for "Atelier Zolotas". In 2020, Fotiadi was a contestant on My Style Rocks.

== Personal life ==
From 2013 to 2019, Fotiadi had been in a relationship with model Yiannis Borbokis, and on 21 June 2017 she gave birth to their first child, a son, Christos-Michael Borbokis.

Awards and achievements
Preceded by Ismini Dafopoulou	Star Hellas; 2015	Succeeded by Maria Psilou
Preceded by Ismini Dafopoulou	Miss Universe Greece; 2018	Succeeded by Ioanna Bella
