= Vicky Kaya =

Greek model and television presenter

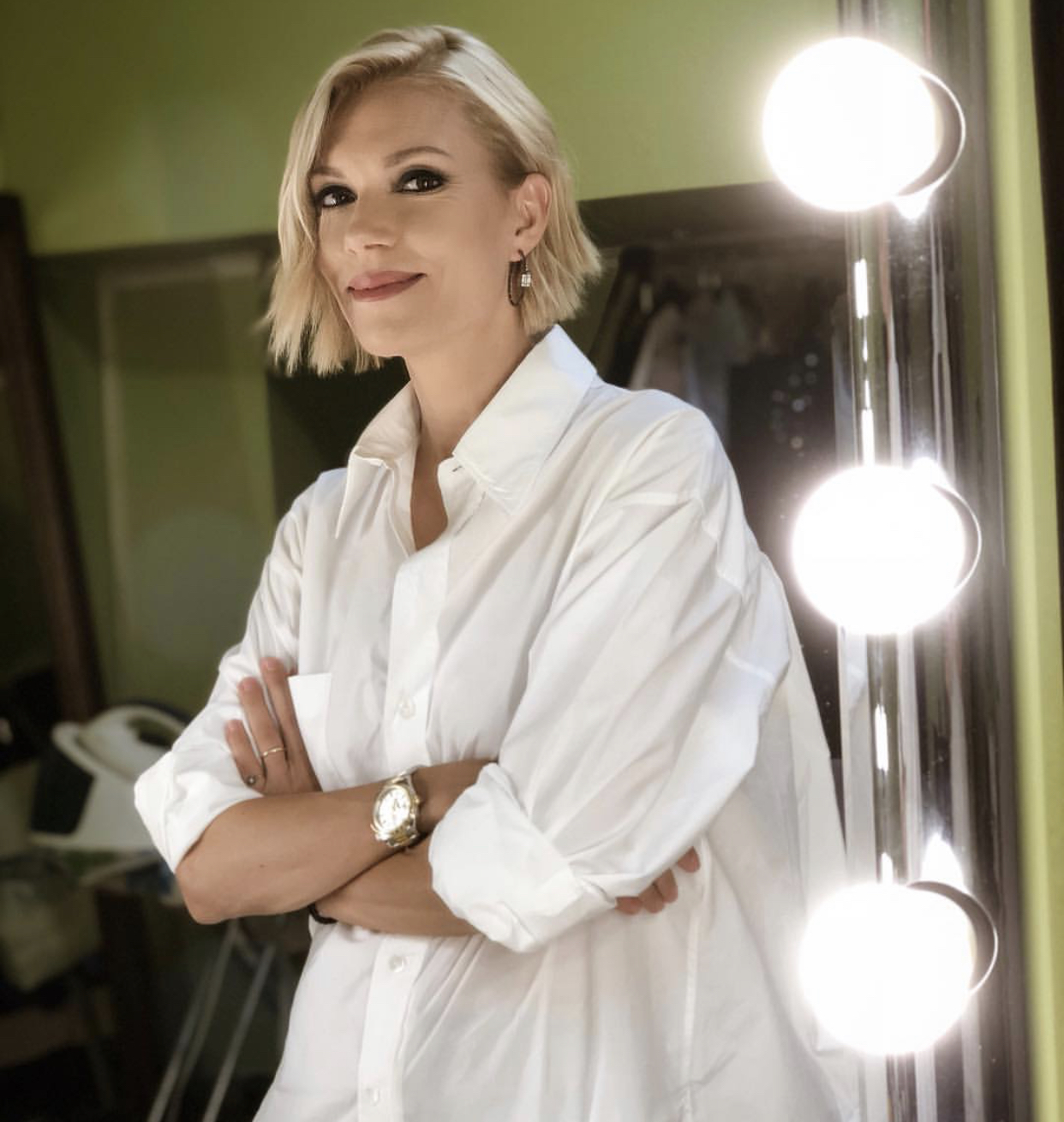
- Kaya in 2018
- Born: Vasiliki Kaya; 4 July 1978 (age 48); Athens, Greece
- Height: 1.77 m (5 ft 10 in)
- Spouses: Nikos Krithariotis (m. 2010; div. 2013) Elias Krassas (m. 2014)
- Children: 2
- Website: fashionworkshop.gr

Vasiliki "Vicky" Kaya (Greek: Βασιλική "Βίκυ" Καγιά; 4 July 1978) is a Greek fashion model and television presenter. She has appeared on the covers of numerous international fashion magazines such as Vogue, Esquire, Madame Figaro, Marie Claire, and Elle.

== Career ==
=== Modelling career beginnings and international success ===
Kaya has been modelling since the age of 14. She was spotted in the street, and from there embarked on one of the most successful careers in the fashion world, appearing in many catalogue bookings, campaigns, magazines and television commercials worldwide. At age 18 she moved to Paris where her career took off. She also worked in Milan, Germany and London. Her appearances have been diverse, from the catwalk to television acting. For many years she had been based in New York City and was represented by Wilhelmina Models in New York. She walked the catwalk for such designers as Chanel, Valentino, Christian Dior, Vivienne Westwood and Jean Paul Gaultier.

Over the years she has worked and walked for many leading designers; has shot many of magazine covers, and has been interviewed by magazines such as (Vogue, Elle, Cosmopolitan, Marie Claire, Wallpaper, InStyle, Dutch, Nylon, Tatler, Harpers and Queen, Red, Madame Figaro, L'Officiel, Esquire, etc.). She has represented a number of companies in TV campaigns in the USA, Europe and Greece. In the USA and Europe she has done campaigns for Johnson and Johnson (USA, National Campaign), L'Oreal Paris (France and Eastern Europe), Dove (Europe), Virginia Slims (USA, National Campaign), Garnier Paris, Nivea Body – Nivea Make-up – Nivea Hair (Europe), Schwarzkopf and C&A (Europe).

=== Television ===
Since 2006, Kaya has hosted a number of TV shows. From 2009 to 2011, and again from 2018 onwards, she has hosted Greece's Next Top Model and in 2018, the show came back with Kaya as a judge. She also hosts a Greek fashion reality show called "Shopping Star".

=== Other ventures ===
In 2011, she founded The Fashion Workshop, which is the official offshoot of the educational colossus Mod'Art International, where the most eminent and qualified professionals, from all the relevant fields, offer their experience and know-how in fashion to the younger generations, through a unique studies program. Fashion Workshop is based in the centre of Athens and is also certified by the minister of education of Greece.

In 2020, she founded Great for Women, a brand that focuses on women's well-being. Great for Women first product is a multivitamin for women.

== Personal life ==
From 2010 to 2013 Kaya was married to entrepreneur Nikos Krithariotis. In 2013, she began dating entrepreneur Elias Krassas with whom married on 18 July 2014 in Paris, France. Kaya and Krassas have two children: a daughter Bianca-Alexandra (born 25 May 2015) and a son Karolos-Elias (born 20 January 2018).

== Filmography ==
=== Film ===
Year	Title	Role	Notes	Ref.
2005	Loafing and Camouflage: Sirens in the Aegean	Marialena Georgiadou	Film debut	
2006	Cars	Sally Carrera	Greek voice role	
2011	Cars 2	Sally Carrera	Greek voice role	
2011	Loafing and Camouflage: Sirens at Land	Marialena Georgiadou		
2017	Cars 3	Sally Carrera	Greek voice role	
2023	Polydroso	Sophia		
2026	The suitcase		post-production	

=== Television ===
Year	Title	Role(s)	Notes
1998	National Annual Beauty Pageant of Greece	Herself (co-host)	TV special
1998	Playmate of the Year	Herself (judge)	TV special
2006-2008	So You Think You Can Dance	Herself (host)	Talent show; season 1-2
2007	Mermaids	dream girl	1 episode
2008-2009	Eisai Mesa?	Herself (host)	Sunday game show
2009	Morning Coffee with Vicky Kaya	Herself (host)	Daytime talk show on ANT1; season 20
2009-2010	National Annual Beauty Pageant of Greece	Herself (host)	TV special
2009-2011	Greece's Next Top Model	Herself (host & judge)	Reality show based on ANTM; season 1-2
2011	America's Next Top Model	Herself (guest)	Episode: "Nikos Papadopoulos"
2011	2011 MadWalk - The Fashion Music Project	Herself (host)	TV special
2012	2012 MadWalk - The Fashion Music Project	Herself (host)	TV special
2013	2013 MadWalk - The Fashion Music Project	Herself (host)	TV special
2014	Modern Family	Vasso	1 episode
2015-2016	Joy - Fashion Workshop	Herself (host)	Weekend talk show
2016	Flashback	Herself (host)	3 episodes
2016–2023	Shopping Star	Herself (host)	Daytime fashion show on Star Channel; season 1-7
2018–2020; 2022	Greece's Next Top Model	Herself (host & judge)	Reality show based on ANTM; season 3-5 & 7
2021	2021 MadWalk - The Fashion Music Project	Herself (host)	TV special
2021–2022	Dancing with the Stars	Herself (host)	Talent show; season 7
2023	2023 MadWalk - The Fashion Music Project	Herself (host)	TV special
2024	2024 MadWalk - The Fashion Music Project	Herself (host)	TV special
2025	2025 MadWalk - The Fashion Music Project	Herself (host)	TV special
2025	The Voice of Greece	Herself (guest)	Episode: "Celebrity Christmas Special"

=== Music videos ===
Year	Music video	Artist
1994	"To Oraiotero Plasma tou Kosmou"	Lefteris Pantazis
2000	"Darling"	Bob Sinclar
2005	"Pano stin trela mou"	Vanessa Adamopoulou & Herself
2012	"Entasi"	Kostas Martakis

== Stage ==
Production	Year	Theater	Role
The Producers	2007-2009	Theater Aliki	Ulla Inga Hansen Benson Yansen Tallen Hallen Svaden Swanson
Annie	2014	Ellinikos Kosmos Theater	Lily
