= Star Channel (Greece) =

- Country: Greece
- Broadcast area: National
- Headquarters: Viltanioti 36, Kifissia, Greece

Programming
- Language: Greek
- Picture format: 1080i HDTV (downscaled to 16:9 576i for the SDTV feed)

Ownership
- Owner: New Television S.A. (Giannis Vardinogiannis)
- Sister channels: Omega TV Cyprus

History
- Launched: 4 December 1993
- Former names: Channel 29 (1990–1993)

Links
- Website: STAR CHANNEL

Availability

Terrestrial
- Digea: All over Greece at local frequencies

Star Channel is a Greek free-to-air television channel that broadcasts a mix of foreign and Greek shows. It was launched in December 1993 and is owned by New Television S.A. (a company owned by Giannis Vardinogiannis).

Star Channel is known in Greece mostly for its programming style, both in terms of live shows and news content, with an increased focus on lifestyle, showbiz, gossip, and fashion news, and on "comedic" presentation.

In 2013, Star started combining information with entertainment, resulting in the channel's shift to a more serious tone. Star Channel generated €64 million in net profit in 2014 which represents a 32.2% increase from the previous year.

== History ==
Star Channel was launched on 4 December 1993 to compete with Mega, ANT1, Alpha TV and ERT Channels. It began broadcasting children's programs as well as foreign series. In 1994 – Star Channel began to exchange family/children's programs from Alpha, then known as Skai (Greek spelling of Sky) with Star's children's programming. Star Channel made its international debut in 2005, joining the UBI World TV platform, which made Star available to viewers in Australia as well as in Asia and Africa. UBI World TV launched in New Zealand in 2008 making Star International available there.

In March 2011, Star Channel began showing some of its programs in 16:9 – mostly television series and films – and as of April, it switched to 16:9 for all its programming, including its own shows and news broadcasts.

In March 2016, Star Channel started its pilot broadcast of STAR HD (1080i) through Digea in Attica and Central Macedonia on 27 February 2016.

== Star International ==
Star International was launched in November 2005 and airs the "best of" Star Channel programming to Greeks in the Asia Pacific region, Africa and North America.

Star International is currently available to viewers in Australia, New Zealand, South Africa and Asia through TV Plus; it operates on a 24-hour schedule.

In October 2009, Star International officially launched in North America, available exclusively on RCN Cable in the United States but in June 2010, RCN Cable dropped the channel due to the low number of subscriptions.

In May 2011, Star International re-launched in the US and was made available via satellite on the Home2US platform. In late 2012, Home2US ceased operations. The channel is currently available in North America through IPTV provider Ellas TV.

On 23 September 2014, Star International launched in Canada via Bell Fibe TV.

On 10 December 2020, Star International launched on Bell Satellite TV, making the channel available across Canada.
