= Disco (disambiguation) =

Disco is a genre of music originating in the 1970s.

Disco, DISCO or Discos may also refer to:

- Discothèque, a nightclub that primarily plays disco music
- (British) A dance party, a social gathering in which the main activity is dancing

== Places in the United States ==
- Disco, Illinois, an unincorporated community in Hancock County
- Disco, Michigan, a ghost town in Oceana County
- Disco, Tennessee, an unincorporated community in Blount County
- Disco, Wisconsin, an unincorporated community in Jackson County

== People ==
- Disco Sally, stage name of Studio 54 dancer Sally Lippman (1900–1982)
- Disco Shanti (born 1965), Indian actress
- Disco Inferno (wrestler) (born 1967), American professional wrestler
- Disco Fury, Canadian professional wrestler, trainer of Bambi Hall

== Arts and entertainment ==
=== Films ===
- Disco (2008 film), a French film starring Franck Dubosc
- Disco (2012 film), a Telugu comedy film
- Disco (2026 film), Indian Malayalam action thriller film
- Disco, a 2010 British short film written and directed by Luke Snellin
- "Disco", 2003 episode of British television series Balamory
- Disco: Soundtrack of a Revolution, a 2020 BBC disco-themed documentary miniseries
- The Secret Disco Revolution, a 2012 Canadian documentary about disco music

=== Music ===
==== Albums ====
- Disco (Grace Jones album), 2015
- Disco (Kylie Minogue album), 2020
- Disco (Pet Shop Boys album), 1986
- Disco, a 2008 album by Uhm Jung-hwa

==== Songs ====
- "D.I.S.C.O.", by Ottawan, 1979
- "Disco", by Crossfade from Crossfade, 2004
- "Disco", by Metro Station from Metro Station, 2007
- "Disco", by The Music from The Music, 2003
- "Disco", by Slum Village from Trinity (Past, Present and Future), 2002
- "Disco" (Surf Curse song), from Heaven Surrounds You, 2019
- "Disco", by Turnstile from Time & Space, 2018
- "Disco", by Widespread Panic from Light Fuse, Get Away, 1997
- "My Disco", by Big Black from Headache, 1987

==== Other music ====
- Disco Ensemble, Finnish post-hardcore/punk band originally called DisCo
- Disco mix, a remix style

=== Other ===
- Disco (TV series), German music show, 1971–1982
- Disco: A Decade of Saturday Nights, 2003–2005 touring exhibition on disco culture

== Brands and enterprises ==
- Disco (software), optical-disk burning software for Mac OS X
- Disco Corporation, Japanese precision-tool manufacturer
- Dominion Iron and Steel Company, or DISCO, Canadian mining company, 1901–1921
- Disco (supermarket chain), an Argentine supermarket chain founded in 1961
- Supermercados Disco del Uruguay, an Uruguayan supermarket chain
- DISCO (diagnostic interview), the Diagnostic Interview for Social and Communication Disorders
- Discos (snack), a wheat and potato-based snack food

== Other uses ==
- Disco fashion, a clothing style in the 1970s

== See also ==
- Disc (disambiguation) (also covers disk)
- Disco Inferno (disambiguation)
- Discount (disambiguation), sometimes shortened to disco
- Discovery (disambiguation), some products named Discovery are nicknamed disco
- Disko (disambiguation)
