= Holiday lighting technology =

Decorative lighting for festivities

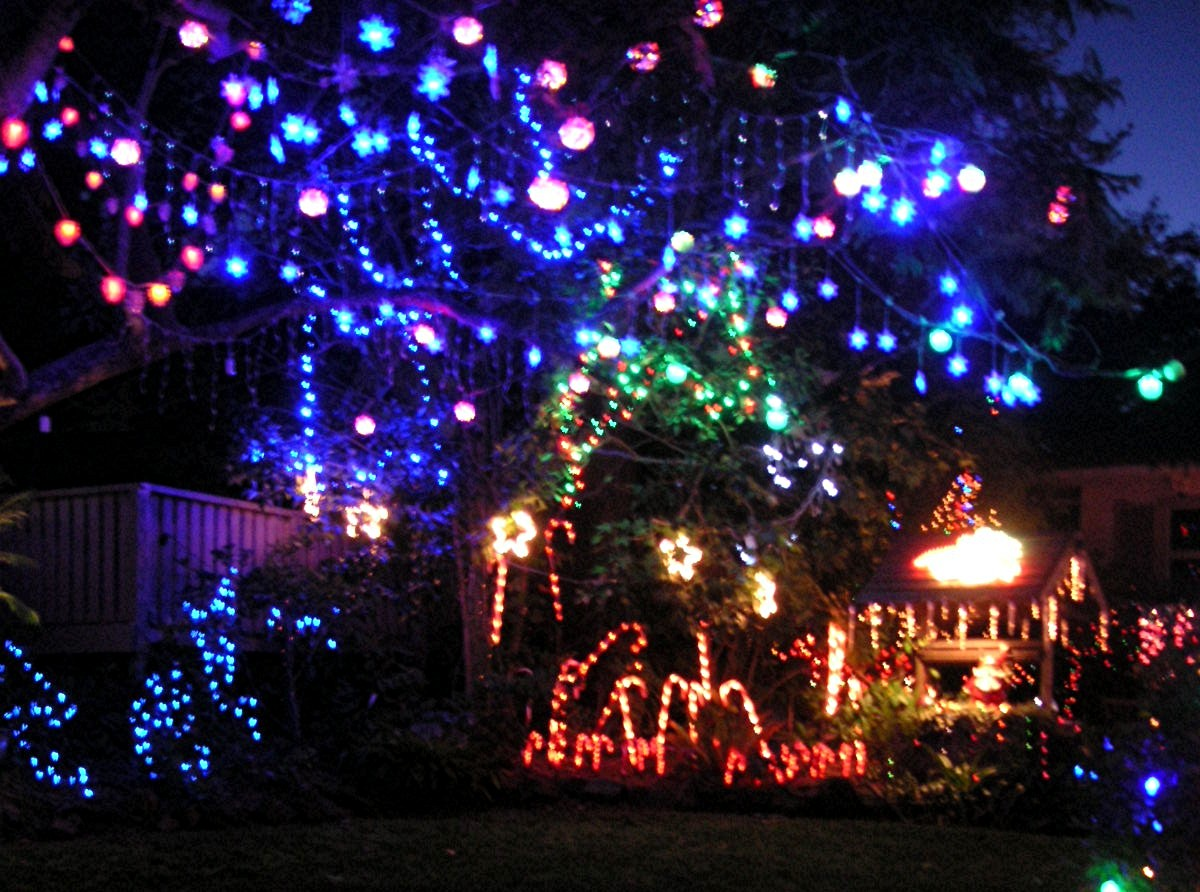
A variety of sizes, shapes and colours can be seen among these lights.

Holiday lighting technology has been subject to considerable development and variation since the replacement of candles by electric lights. While originally used during the Christmas holidays as Christmas lights, modern electric light arrays have become popular around the world in many cultures and are used both during religious festivals and for other purposes unconnected to any festivities.

== Incandescent lights ==
Incandescent light bulbs have been commonly used in holiday lights until recently. These lights produce a broad-spectrum white light, and are colored by coating the glass envelope with a translucent paint which acts as a color filter. Some early Japanese-made lamps used colored glass.

== Glow discharge lights ==
Glow discharge light bulbs also can be used as holiday lights. The most common are neon, argon and mercury fluorescent lamps. They can glow in different colors, depending on the gas filling or the chemical composition of the phosphor. Neon lamps have a characteristic orange color, argon glow purple. Mercury lamps have most of the spectrum in the UV range, so their inner part of the bulb is covered with a phosphor, which converts invisible UV radiation into blue, green, yellow or other-colored light.

== LEDs ==
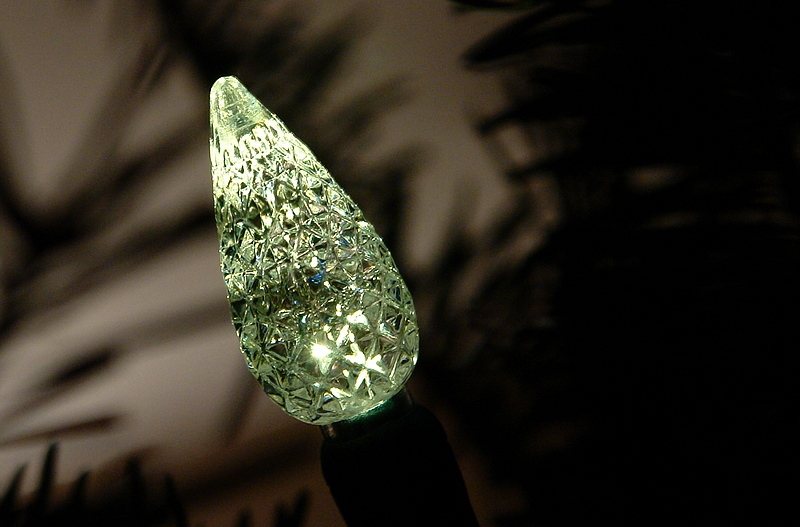
An LED holiday light.

Light-emitting diode (LED) holiday lights are quickly gaining popularity in many places due to their low energy usage, long lifetime, and associated low maintenance. Colored LEDs are far more efficient at producing light than their colored incandescent counterparts.

There are two types of LEDs: colored LEDs and white LEDs. Colored LEDs emit a specific color light (monochromatic light), regardless of the color of the transparent plastic lens that encases the LED's chip. The plastic may be colored for cosmetic reasons, but does not substantially affect the color of the light emitted. Holiday lights of this type do not suffer from color fading because the light is determined by the LED's chip rather than the plastic lens.

White LEDs are similar in most respects such as power and durability, but utilize a two-stage process to create the white (polychromatic, or broad spectrum) light. In the first stage, the LED produces one color of light, similar to any other LED. In the second stage, some of the blue or violet-blue is absorbed by a phosphor, which fluoresces yellow, imitating the broad spectrum of colors which the eye perceives as "white". This is essentially the same process used in fluorescent lamps, except for the use of an LED to create blue light rather than excited gas plasma to create ultraviolet.

White LEDs can be used as white holiday lights or to create any other color through the use of colored refractors and lenses similar to those used with incandescent bulbs. Color fading may occur due to the exposure of colored plastics to sunlight or heat, as with ordinary holiday lights. Yellowing may also occur in the epoxy body in which the LED is encased if left in the sun consistently.

LEDs use much less electricity (only 4 watts for a 70-light string) and have a much greater lifespan than incandescent lamps. Since they are constructed from solid state materials and have no metallic filaments to burn out or break, LEDs are much less susceptible to breakage from impact or rough handling.

Although LEDs are long-life devices, older or lower-quality strands of LED-based holiday lights can suffer from early failure. This is particularly so with blue ones, which are the newest and most expensive, and therefore prone to cost-cutting. Most LED-based holiday lights use copper wire which connects to the plated, copper-alloy leads of the LEDs. Having dissimilar metals in contact can result in galvanic corrosion inside of the lamps' sockets, causing them to stop working. Some older sets of LED holiday lights have each LED permanently mounted in a non-removable weathertight base to keep out moisture, helping to prevent such corrosion. However, this prevents the user from replacing defective lamps.

Many mini sets use standard 3 mm dome-shaped LEDs, and have a plastic cover over them to provide refraction, which is an important step in diffusing the unidirectional light they cast. These covers come in C5, C6, and C7 sizes (5/8, 3/4, and 7/8-inch, or 16, 19, and 22 mm diameters, respectively) pointed "strawberries", G12 (12mm or almost 1/2-inch) globe "raspberries", and "M5" (5mm or 7/32-inch) pointed cylinders, equivalent to the T1 3/4 mini lights so common since the 1980s. For blue and green, these covers may have some fluorescence, leading to a lighter color. Other sets have 5 mm domes with no covers because these project light in one direction. Instead they have a cone-shaped indentation on the top to refract light out to the sides. Still other sets have covers like snowflakes (or for Halloween, pumpkins). There are also multi-LED screw-in bulbs which replace real C7 1/2 and C9 1/4 bulbs and are much closer in brightness than the mini imitations.

In the modern age, LEDs have emerged with RGB technology to allow Christmas lights to display a possible range of around 4.6 billion colors. One alternative is the use of RGBW technology which also adds the ability for lights to allow display a range of whites from warmer to cooler. RGB technology allows for far more animation than standard electronic light controls including the ability to smoothly fade through different colors.

One drawback to this technology for outdoor lighting, at least in North America, has been that squirrels have been found damaging them. The species must wear down their continually-growing incisors by gnawing on hard objects. They apparently find the diode's durable plastic construction useful for this, while its low power consumption means a minimal chance of electrical shocks to discourage them. Animal experts have suggested leaving edible hard nuts on the ground around lighting fixtures to distract the rodents with food that can serve the same dental needs.

== Fiber optic lights ==
Fiber optic technology is also used in holiday lighting, especially by incorporating it into artificial Christmas trees. Incandescent lamps or LEDs are located in the tree base and many optic fibers extend from the lamps to the ends of the tree branches.

== Bubble lights ==
Bubble lights are a type of incandescent novelty light that acquired some popularity during the 1950s. Their main feature is a sealed glass tube with a colored bubbling liquid inside, created by the heat from the incandescent light. The fluid within the vial was originally a lightweight oil, but now is methylene chloride for a more consistent bubble effect. While the idea was first demonstrated by Benjamin Franklin, the idea was adapted for use in Christmas lights. They were invented by Carl Otis in 1935, who sold the patents to the NOMA Electric Corporation. There is a long story involving patent fights. Bubble lights can still be purchased online and in stores to this day.

== Laser projectors ==
Laser projector systems became a prominent phenomenon in 2015; the devices are typically installed on a stake in front of a house, projecting colored dots resembling stars. The devices are marketed as being safer and easier to install than traditional string lights. The concept was popularized by Telebrands, which launched a brand of low-cost laser projectors known as Star Shower Laser Light in July 2015. Star Shower saw a considerably high demand, with stores quickly running out of stock, and reports of the devices being stolen right out of front yards; The New York Times compared the phenomenon to those of Teletubbies and Cabbage Patch Kids toys. In 2016, Star Shower introduced an updated version of their product with motion effects.

While the popularity of Star Shower and its imitators have been credited to their ease of use, laser projectors have received mixed reception from professional holiday lighting designers; one called them the "lazy way" to decorate a house, and another argued that "there's nothing more aesthetically pleasing and magical than a fully decorated house and landscape." Curbed also acknowledged that the devices can "throw a smattering of errant green measles upon your neighbor's garage. Or your parked car.", and that Star Shower had put out warnings stating that they were not to be used within 10 miles of an airport lest they interfere with pilots' vision.

== Light sculptures ==
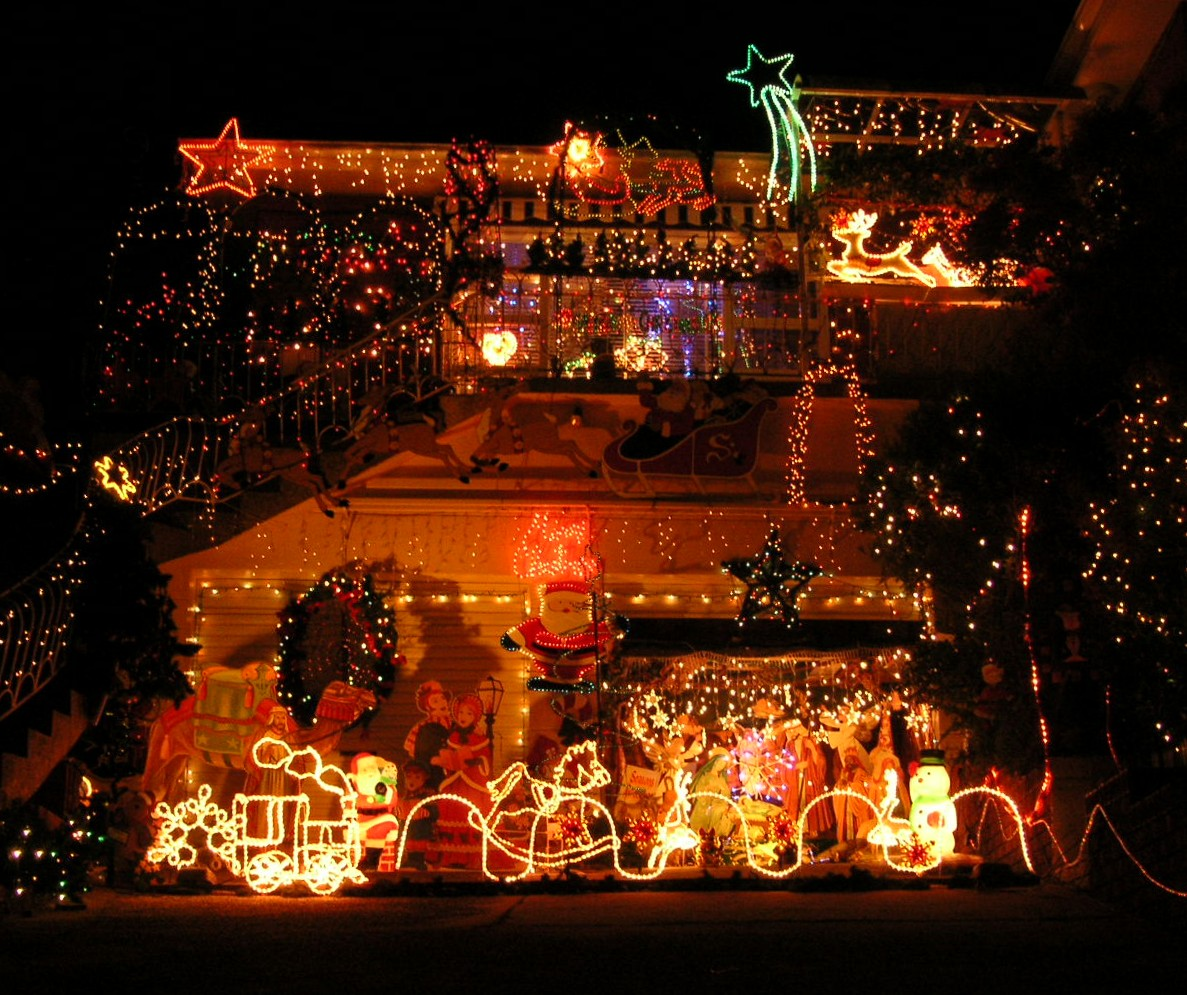
A number of light sculptures feature in this elaborate display which surrounds a Nativity scene set in a basement garage.

Lights are sometimes mounted on frames—typically metal for large lights and plastic for miniature ones. These were first used for public displays on lampposts, street lights, and telephone poles in cities and towns. For public displays large C7 bulbs are generally used, but by the 1990s light sculptures were being made in smaller form with miniature lights for home use. Consumer types now tend to come with a plastic sheet backing printed in the proper design, and in the 2000s now with nearly photographic quality graphics and usually on a holographic "laser" backing. Public displays often have outdoor-rated garland on the frame as well, making them very decorative even in the daytime. Places where notable displays of light sculptures may be seen include Gatlinburg and Pigeon Forge, Tennessee.

On a smaller scale, one of the most popular light sculptures is the sparkleball. Sparkleballs are handmade globes made from threading holiday lights into a sphere built of plastic cups. The cups are joined by soldering, cable ties, or with a hand stapler. Usually spotted individually on front porches at Christmas, the residents of North Yale Avenue in Fullerton, California have made a holiday tradition of hanging 450 sparkleballs from the trees lining their street.

== Sizes ==
Note that the following may be particular to North America, and may vary in countries with mains other than 120 volts.

Christmas lighting began with small C6 bulbs — where the C means "cone" for the candle flame shape and the 6 indicates the diameter measured in eighths of an inch, 3/4 inches (19 mm). These were on a miniature candelabra screw-base, now designated E10 (Edison screw, 10 mm). Replicas of these bulbs are now produced as miniature strings, usually with the entire bulb replaced, but sometimes with a decorative cover with regular bulbs inside. These bulbs tend to be transparent white or colors, and are often ornately designed with crystal-like patterns.

Later bulbs called C7 1/2, have diameters of seven and a half 1/8th inches (15/16 in, or 24 mm) using an E12 candelabra base; however, these have a blunt shape (and should therefore be called B7 1/2, or B24). Mixing metric and English units, there are also now G30 globes which are 30 mm (1 3/16 in, or G9 1/2) in diameter using these sockets. These are still used for the classic look or even retro style, and use about five watts each. Older bulbs drew 7 1/2 watts of power, and were reduced to save power. Early bulbs, as well as some new antique reproductions, are made in various shapes and then painted like Christmas ornaments. Bubble lights and twinkle bulbs also come in this size.

Outdoor-only bulbs are designated C9 1/4 (1 5/32 in, or 29 mm), and have a similar blunt shape as the C7 1/2, but use an E17 "intermediate" base. Some modern versions of these strings are now listed for indoor and outdoor use. These bulbs are rated at about seven watts each, and are available in a globe shape, designated G40 (40 mm, or 1 9/16 in). Some of the blunt-shape bulbs now come painted with designs, or swirled in more than one color. It is now very difficult to find twinkle bulbs in this size.

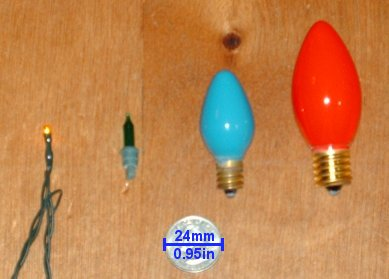
The four most common bulb sizes used in the United States. From left to right: "rice" style LED (0.057w), T1 3/4 "midget" (0.5w), C7 1/2 (5w) and C9 1/4 (7.5w). Quarter shown for size comparison.

Standard mini lights are T1 3/4, indicating that they are a tube shape 7/32 inches (5.5 mm) in diameter. Larger mini bulbs, which began appearing around 2004, are about twice this size, but are still very uncommon. Both types, along with most of the candle-shaped ones, are pinched-off at the tip rather than the base during manufacturing. Most contemporary miniature light bulbs have an internal shunt that is intended to activate when the bulb's filament burns out. The shunt closes the circuit across the bad filament, restoring continuity, which allows the rest of the string to remain lit. However, if one shunt fails to close properly, the whole string will fail to light.

Other miniature types include globe-shaped "pearl" and smaller "button" lights, which are often painted in translucent or pearlescent colors. "Rice" lights are tiny, like a grain of rice, and can even have a subminiature base, if they are not already fixed permanently to the wires (on low-voltage sets). Rice lights are typically transparent, although colored variations do exist. They are intended to create tiny points of light, and are suitable for decorating miniature models, small wreaths, and other similar situations in which even "midget" T1 3/4 lights may be too large.

LED lights, which are encased in solid plastic rather than a hollow glass bulb, may be molded into any shape. Because the LED casts light in only one direction, the most common way LED lights are designed, even "plain" sets having some sort of crystal pattern to create refraction.

Many bargain brands have dome-shaped LEDs which focus the light so that it's sharply visible when viewed head-on, but almost invisible from a perpendicular direction. This has both advantages and disadvantages, depending on one's decorating needs.

If a small LED bulb size with wider viewing angle is desired, wide-angle LEDs are available. The body is cylindrical with a concave conical depression, instead of a dome-shaped lens at the tip, to cause wider distribution of light.

All miniature bulbs, including some LED sets, have a wedge base, though their designs are inconsistent with one another, making it somewhat difficult for the average consumer to change bulbs. To replace a bulb, the plastic base of the bulb must usually be changed by straightening the two wires and pulling the glass part out. Most replacement bulbs do not even include the bases anymore, despite getting only ten in a package and being charged nearly half the price of a new string of 100. For this reason, many Americans treat miniature holiday lights as disposable. In addition, colored lights tend to fade with even brief exposure to weather. Many LED sets are permanently wired, with bases that look like conventional pull-out bulbs.

== Light sets ==
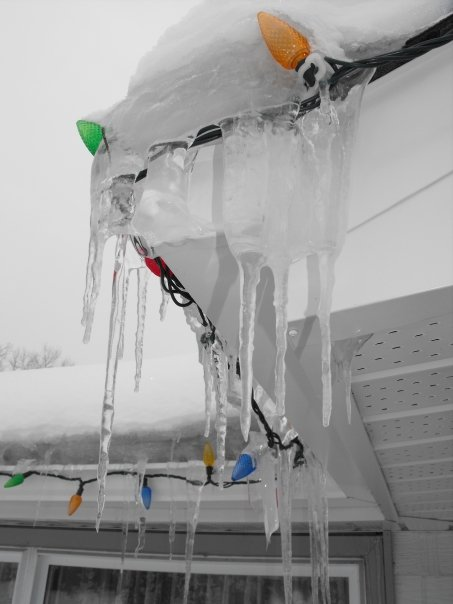
A string of electric Christmas lights, unlit, decorating the edge of a roof on a house in Keswick, Ontario, Canada; Christmas 2008

Traditional C6 bulbs were typically 15 volts, and used in series strings of eight bulbs, or multiples of 8. The use of eight bulbs (120 volts for 8 lamps equals 15 volts per lamp) gives each lamp the rated voltage for proper brightness. Later sets used nine bulbs on a string to increase the life of the bulbs by reducing the voltage each lamp received (120 volts divided by 9 lamps = 13 volts per bulb) but not significantly reducing the light output of the bulbs.

Large C7 1/2 and C9 1/4 bulbs typically come in sets of 25, though bubble lights come in sets of seven, and some non-holiday sets come in ten or twelve. Sockets are usually spaced about one foot (30 cm) apart, and are clamped to the wire with an integrated insulation-piercing connector. Some older parallel sets had 15 bulbs, as do some of the newer globe sets manufactured today. Both of these bulbs are designed to run on 120 volts AC and the light sets that use them are wired in parallel.

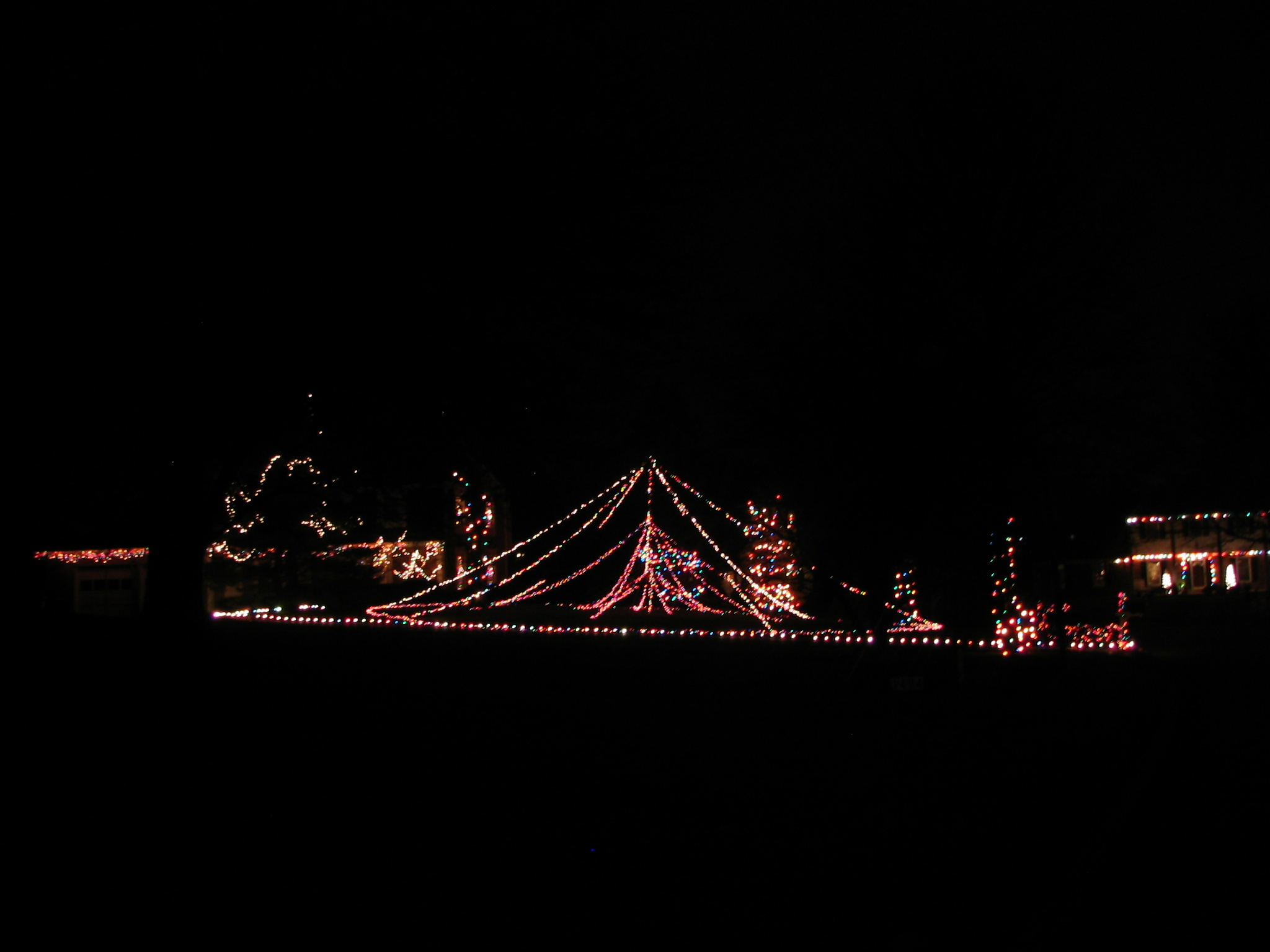
This house in Cincinnati, Ohio is well known in the area for its traditional light display. The only types of lights used are mini, C7, and C9. Special wiring was to be installed to light the 125-foot-tall (38 m) pine tree with C9 bulbs for the 2007 display.

Miniature lights debuted in the early 1950s and first came in sets of 35 (3.5 volts per bulb), and sometimes smaller sets of 20 (6 volts per bulb). They were known as "Italian lights" because they were first made by Italian companies such as Silvestri. For a short time, sets of miniature lights were manufactured with the bulbs permanently wired into the sets, preventing users from replacing the bulbs. A shunt device inside each bulb kept the rest of a set lit when one or more of its bulbs burned out. Within a few years, sets were being manufactured using sockets that accepted miniature bulbs with E5 screw bases, rather than the current wedge base. The wedge base replaced the screw base in manufacturing by 1966. Early wedge bases often incorporated flower-shaped bulb holders to make it easier for users to pull out and push in the bulbs when replacing them; they also added a decorative touch to the sets. Sets of ten (12 volts per bulb) were made for very small trees, but are quite hot, and are now usually used for tree toppers only. This number is convenient for stars, which have a total of ten points (five outward and five inward), and often have another light in the middle, occasionally on both sides.

Incandescent miniatures now usually come in sets of 50 or 100 (which contains two circuits of 50) 2.5 V 170 mA bulbs, though decorative sets with larger bulbs (C6 or pearl style) typically come in sets of 35 or 70. Several "extra-bright" sets also use 70 or 105 bulbs, keeping the per-bulb voltage at 3.5 instead of 2.5.

LED sets can vary greatly. Common is a set of 60 (2 volts per bulb), but white LED sets use two circuits of 30 (4 volts per bulb). Multicolor sets may have special wiring, because red and yellow require less voltage than the newer blue-based ones (blue, emerald green and fluorescent white), but typically come in sets with a multiple of 35.

Battery-powered sets typically come in 10 or 12, and can use standard 2.5 to 3.5-volt bulbs because they run two batteries, totaling three volts or less. LEDs are becoming increasingly common as they greatly prolong battery life, but because they also last longer they are often soldered directly to the wires, making up for some of the increased cost of the newer LEDs. "Rice lights" are often made this way as well, and likewise may also have more bulbs per set, as they draw somewhat less power per bulb than other incandescent lamps.

== Control technology ==
Holiday lights can be animated using special "flasher" or twinkle bulbs (usually a red-tipped replacement bulb included with the set) or by electronic controller. Flasher bulbs use a bi-metallic strip which interrupts the circuit when the lamp becomes hot. An electronic holiday light controller usually has a diode bridge followed by a resistor-based voltage divider, a filter capacitor and a fixed-program microcontroller. The micro-controller has three or four outputs which are connected to transistors or thyristor which control interleaved circuits, each with lamps of a single color.

Controllers can be set up to change flashing or animation styles by pressing a button or turning a dial on the unit; others have only one pattern, but the speed of this pattern can usually be adjusted by turning a similar dial.

Most multi-function sets feature eight to sixteen moving light functions. Some very common functions are fading and chasing. More extravagant and less common functions are stepping on and two-channel flashing. These lights usually come in sets of 140 or 150. This is because to give the chasing effect, bulbs must be arranged in four circuits of 35 (sets of 140) or three circuits of 50 (sets of 150). These light sets use even less power than a regular set of 150, because the lights are not always on, and therefore the bulbs also do not get as hot.

Usually, computerized sets cannot be connected end-to-end. However, some newer sets contain special miniature plugs – a female jack is located at the end of the set, and a male plug is located between the control box and the beginning of the actual lights. By disconnecting the control box from one set, it can now be plugged into the end of an identical chasing set to produce a longer strand of chasing lights. These plugs generally have a twist-on locking feature similar to that found on garden hoses.

Computer-controlled holiday displays are becoming more and more common today. For instance, a display in Texas uses a PIC microcontroller-based dimmer scheme, and also refers to dimming controllers that people have built based on this scheme. The designs all use mid-range PIC microcontrollers, are generally modular in units of eight channels (dimmable circuits), and use medium-speed, daisy-chainable, one-direction serial communications for input. Most controllers do not have stand-alone show sequencing capabilities, and rely on a separate computer (usually a PC) to send it real-time sequences of dimmer commands. There are now several companies making equipment and software to do this, some are Light-O-Rama, Pixelcontroller.com, Kulp Lights, Experience Lights, Mattos Designs, and Quin LED, and xLights, Vixen Lights. With Light-O-Rama software, users typically create sequences containing dimming instructions for the controllers. Physically on the controllers, multiple AC outlets can be precisely turned on, off, or dimmed. As this technology is used less for displays, other software such as xLights is used to control individually addressed LEDs, commonly referred to as "pixels". With pixels, designers can create whole house color effects, controlling the color and brightness of each individual bulb. This expands the possibilities for what designers can do given a constrained amount of lights. In addition to the lights, many displays incorporate a personal FM transmitter, allowing the synchronized music to be sent directly into families' vehicles.

Many animated displays now use RGB lighting.

A control technology being developed in Ottawa, Canada that enables multiple homes to link up over the Internet in-real time. A central Web site initiates the timing using Network Time Protocol to keep the local computers synchronized, and each location has a small Java program that controls a device which interfaces with the USB port to which one's holiday lights are connected. In this way, anyone online can "plug in" to this network and at their discretion, working independently or synchronized, engage their holiday light display on a global level.

In the modern age, digital control of Christmas lights via Wifi or Bluetooth technology has emerged. The use of Wifi or Bluetooth allows the use of a smartphone app to change the color of the lights or produce different effects as well as to program animations to music or other sounds. In addition to the same technologies found with Bluetooth, the use of Christmas lights connected to Wifi can allow the lights to be controlled even from a remote location or to be tied into a smart home to turn on and off at preset times and to interact with other appliances in the home.

== Power considerations ==
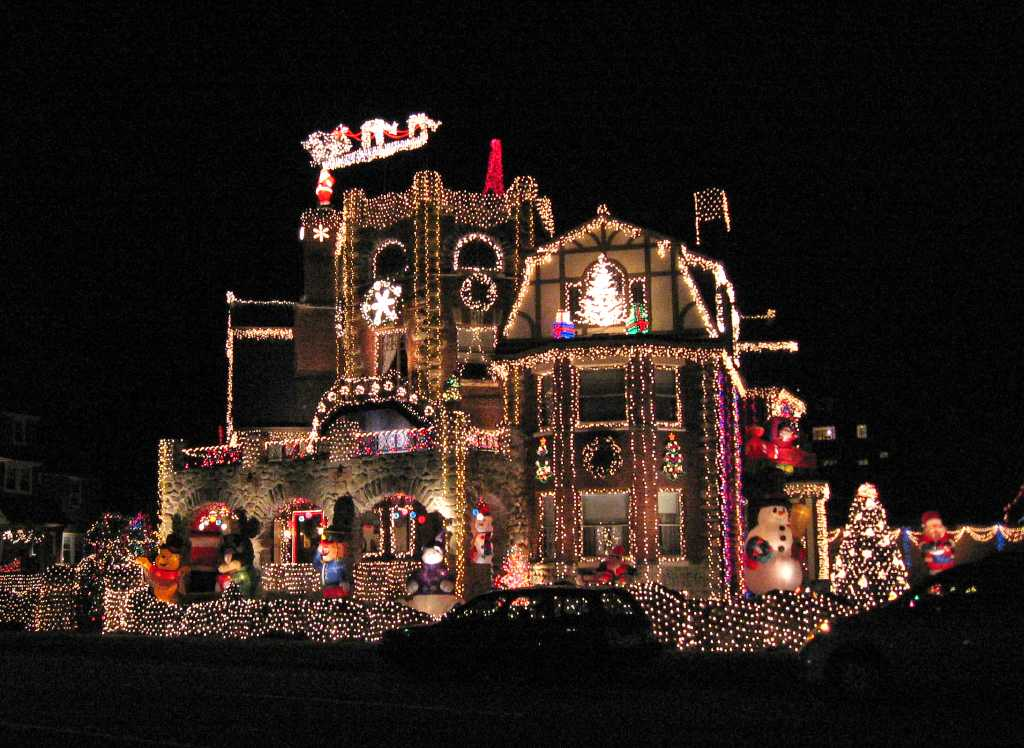
This private residence in Jamaica Plain, Boston displayed 250,000 lights in 2006. The electric utility company installed special wiring; the electric bill was $2,000 per month.

Incandescent (midget) or LED-based sets usually have each lamp connected in series to be powered without a transformer in the set. Screw-base C7 and C9 light sets use line voltage (120 volt) bulbs and are wired in parallel. LED-based sets use a current-limiting resistor to reduce the current supplied to each LED. Neon-lamp-based sets have lamps connected in parallel, each with its own current-limiting resistor. Battery-powered sets are also wired in parallel.

Some incandescent or LED-based strings use a power supply transformer with lamps connected in parallel. These sets are much safer, but there is a voltage drop at the end of the string causing reduced brightness of the lamps at the end of the set. The reduced brightness is, however, less noticeable with LED-based sets than incandescent sets. Power supplies with integrated plugs may make the set difficult to connect in certain places.

A line-operated AC string with a male plug on one end and a female socket on the other end can be conveniently connected end-to-end with other similar strings. The gauge of wire used, current rating of the fuse (if present) and the power consumption of each string will determine how many strings can be safely daisy-chained this way, or whether the end string will have diminished voltage and brightness.

== Safety ==
The number of strands of continuous light sets that may be safely daisy-chained in sequence varies based on whether the lights are LEDs, ordinary miniature light bulbs, or the larger C7/C9 type light bulbs. Other factors include the voltage of the set and the size of the wiring in the set.

Most light sets come with built in fuses to help protect against overheating and to prevent household fuses or circuit breakers from being tripped. If a fuse blows, the strand must be unplugged and the number of strands must be reduced. If the strand has nothing attached, or has blown repeatedly, it may contain a short circuit.

An episode of the Discovery Channel television show MythBusters covered the possible fire danger from holiday lights.
