= Disco ball (disambiguation) =

A disco ball is a rotating spherical object covered by many mirrored facets, usually illuminated by spotlights to create a complex display.

Disco ball or Disco Ball may also refer to:

- Ball (dance event)
  - A ball with disco music
  - A ball with dance music

== Music ==
=== Songs ===
- "Disco Ball", a 2016 by Raphael Gualazzi off the album Love Life Peace
- "Disco Ball", a 2013 song by Sharon Needles off the album PG-13
- "Disco Ball", a 2012 song by Jessica Sutta off the album Sutta Pop
- "Disco Ball" (ミラーボール, Mirābōru; Mirror-ball), a 2007 song by Tokyo Jihen off the album Variety
- "Disco Ball", a 2005 song by Ana da Silva off the album The Lighthouse
- "Disco Ball", a 2004 song by Big & Rich from the video album Big & Rich's Super Galactic Fan Pak later released on the 2007 album Between Raising Hell and Amazing Grace
- "Discoball", a 2013 single by Craig David; see Craig David discography
- "Discoball", a single by Big Kenny
- "Disco Balls", a song by Flying Lotus; see 5: Five Years of Hyperdub

== People and characters ==
- Disco Ball, a performer contestant on the first season of The Masked Dancer (American TV series)
- Disco Ball, a performer contestant on the fifth season of The Masked Singer (Dutch TV series)
- Disco Ball, a performer contestant on, the winner of ¿Quién es la máscara? (Mexican TV series) season 2 (The Masked Singer)
- Disco Ball, a performer contestant on The Masked Singer (German TV series) season 6

== Other uses ==
- "Discoballs", 2021 season 4 episode 28 of Greece's Next Top Model

== See also ==
- Disco Bill, a 1977 studio album by Bill Cosby
- Disco (disambiguation)
- Ball (disambiguation)
- Mirror ball (disambiguation)
