= Telsen Electric Company Ltd =

British electronics company

The Telsen Factory in Aston, Birmingham in 2001

Telsen Electric Company was a British electronics company formed in Birmingham, England, in 1924 by Mr. A. Macnamara at 207 Aston Road.

== History ==
In 1930 they moved to 56 Miller Street and shortly after moved to their new factory at the corner of Philips Street and Thomas Street.

Incorporated in 1933, the Telsen Electric Company Ltd were manufacturers of wireless broadcast receivers, components and construction kits. They had a cabinet making department turning out polished furniture into which wireless receivers were built, mainly from their own components. They were also buying Bakelite cases from Edwin Elliot in Birmingham.

They produced every component one might require for the building of a wireless receiver at home, including the blueprint layouts to encourage tidy construction of receivers to the Telsen designs. The components were listed in a catalogue, which later became incorporated into the Telsen Radiomag, published in Birmingham by James Cond Publishers.

This magazine was produced around 1933 or 1934, and ran for the six issues of volume one. The size of the magazine increased to A4 size after issue two, as did the price, which was 3d for issue two and 6d for issue three, but fell back to 3d for issues five and six. Blueprints were supplied with the larger format magazine as loose sheets.

There are no dates on the magazine covers, and it appears that publication was irregular.

By December 1934 they had insufficient assets to pay their creditors and the company was liquidated.

In 1935 Telsen was bought out of receivership by David Rosenfield Ltd and the business was moved to Manchester where they produced a range of electrical appliances including Clothes Irons, Toasters and Christmas Bubble lights and Fairy Lights. These items can still often be found for sale at auction. Here they were trading as The Telsen Electric Co.(1935) Ltd and were at Fitzgeorge Street, Rochdale Road, Manchester 9.

Today, the factory in Aston, now The Telsen Centre, has been converted to offices and workshops.
