= Light show =

Light show may refer to:

- Light art, a visual art form in which light is the primary medium
- Drone display
- Laser lighting display
- Liquid light show, light projected through colored oil
- Projection mapping, projecting a light display onto a building or other surface
- Christmas lights
- Holiday lighting technology
- Meteor shower
