= Glitterball (disambiguation) =

Glitterball is a live interactive television quiz show in the United Kingdom, which launched in 2007.

Glitterball or Glitter Ball may also refer to:

- Glitterball (song), 2015 song by Sigma and Ella Henderson
- The Glitterball, a 1977 children's science fiction film
- "Glitter Ball", a 2014 episode of RuPaul's Drag Race
- Glitterball, a 1998 song by Simple Minds from the album Néapolis

== See also ==
- Glitter ball
