= Mirror ball =

Mirror ball or Mirrorball may refer to:

- Disco ball or mirror ball

== Music ==
- Mirrorball, a UK band, successor-band to Tzant
- Mirrorball Entertainment, a U.S. record label

=== Albums ===
- Mirror Ball (Neil Young album), 1995, featuring Pearl Jam
- Mirrorball (Sarah McLachlan album), 1999
- Mirrorball (Def Leppard album), 2011

=== Songs ===
- "Mirror Ball" (song), a 2008 song by Alice Nine
- "Mirrorball" (song), a song by Taylor Swift from her 2020 album Folklore
- "Mirrorball", a song by Paul Weller from his 2020 album On Sunset
- "Mirrorball", a song by Blur from their 2015 album The Magic Whip
- "Mirrorball", a song by Elbow from their 2008 album The Seldom Seen Kid
- "Mirrorball", a song by Everything But the Girl from their 1996 album Walking Wounded
- "Disco Ball" (ミラーボール, Mirābōru; Mirror-ball), a 2007 song by Tokyo Jihen off the album Variety
- "There'd Better Be a Mirrorball", a song by Arctic Monkeys from their 2022 album The Car (album)

== Other uses ==
- Mirrorball (TV pilot), 2000 UK sitcom one-off
- AN/ALQ-144, US infra-red guided missile countermeasure device, nicknamed "mirror-ball"

== See also ==
- Yard globe
- Mirror (disambiguation)
- Ball (disambiguation)
- Disco ball (disambiguation)
