= Disco ball =

Sphere with mirrored facets that rotates

3D animation illustrating the rotation of a disco ball and the movement of reflected light spots across surrounding surfaces.

A disco ball (also known as a mirror ball or glitter ball) is a roughly spherical object that reflects light directed at it in many directions, producing a complex display. Its surface consists of hundreds or thousands of facets, nearly all of approximately the same shape and size, and each has a mirrored surface. Usually it is mounted well above the heads of the people present, suspended from a device that causes it to rotate steadily on a vertical axis, and illuminated by spotlights, so that stationary viewers experience beams of light flashing over them and see myriad spots of light spinning around the walls of the room.

Miniature glitter balls are sold as novelties and used for several decorative purposes, including dangling from the rear-view mirror of an automobile or as Christmas tree ornaments. Glitter balls may have inspired a homemade version of the sparkleball, the American outsider craft of building decorative light balls out of Christmas lights and plastic cups.

== History ==
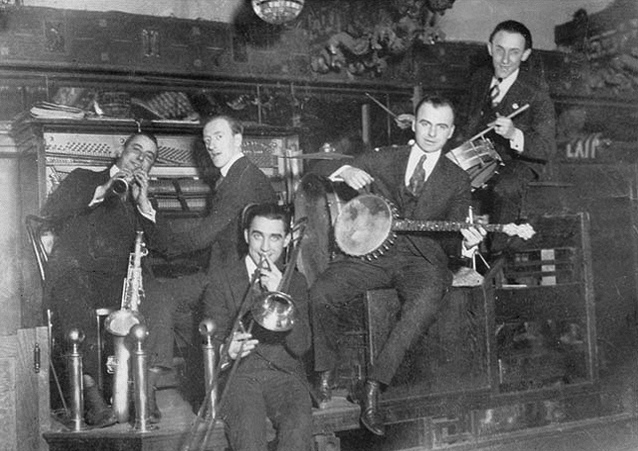
A mirrored ball can be seen above the bandstand in this 1919 photo of the Louisiana Five jazz band.

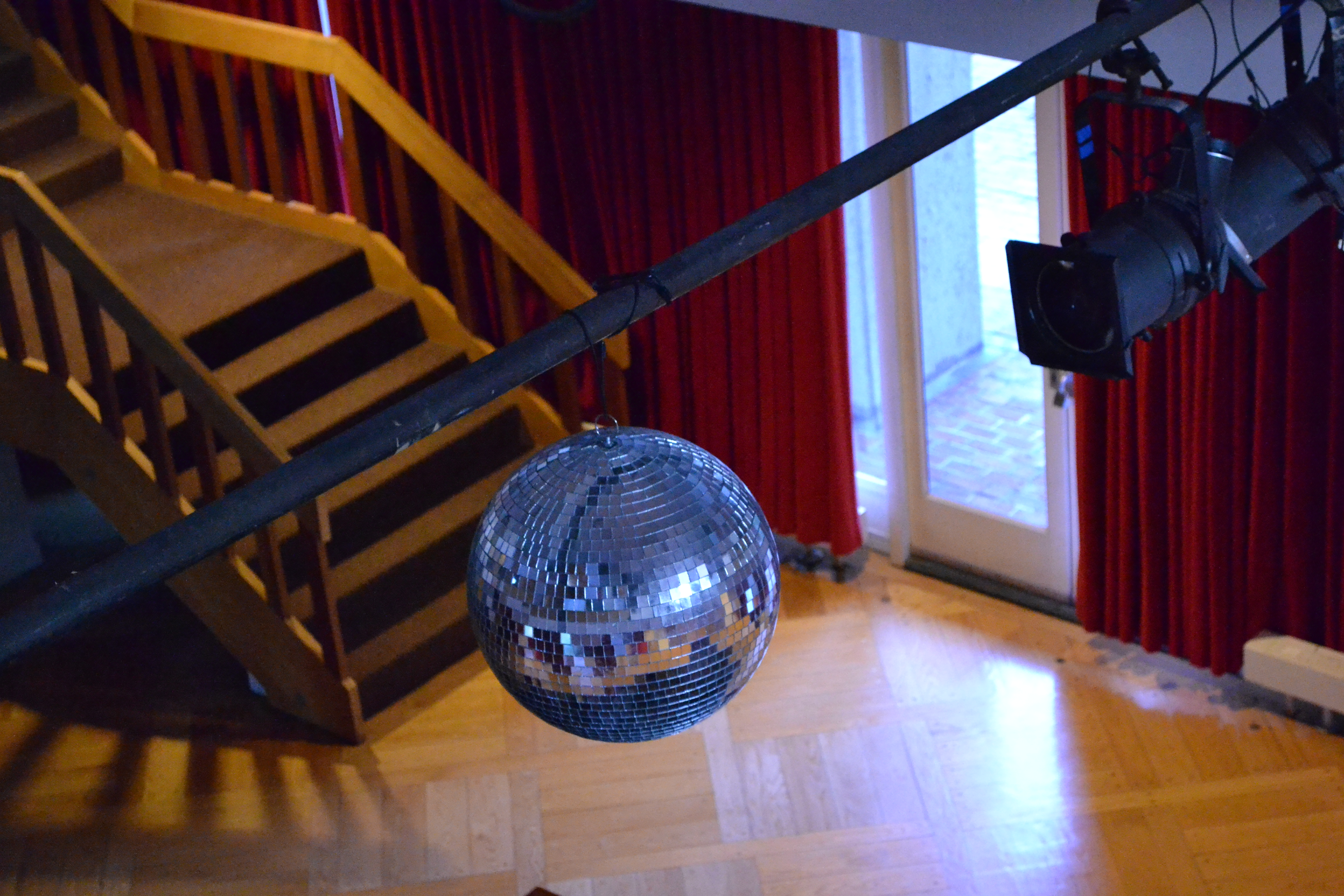
A disco ball and spotlight in the Fishbowl of Currier House

"Disco balls" were first patented by U.S. inventor Louis Bernard Woeste as "myriad reflectors". The product was produced by his company, Stephens & Woeste. The concept predated the patent with records of a "mirrored ball" dating back to 1897.

Disco balls began to be widely used in nightclubs in the 1920s. An early example can be seen in the nightclub sequence of Berlin: Die Sinfonie der Großstadt, a 1927 German silent film. From the 1960s to the 1980s these devices were standard pieces of equipment in discothèques, and the term "disco ball" became the product's most popular name.

A Louisville, Kentucky company known as Omega Mirror Products claims to have made 90% of the disco balls used in the United States during the disco craze and remains a supplier.

Disco balls had a resurgence in the 2020s, particularly as home decor. In 2023 disco balls were suggested as a safe method of viewing partial solar eclipses.

== Popular culture ==
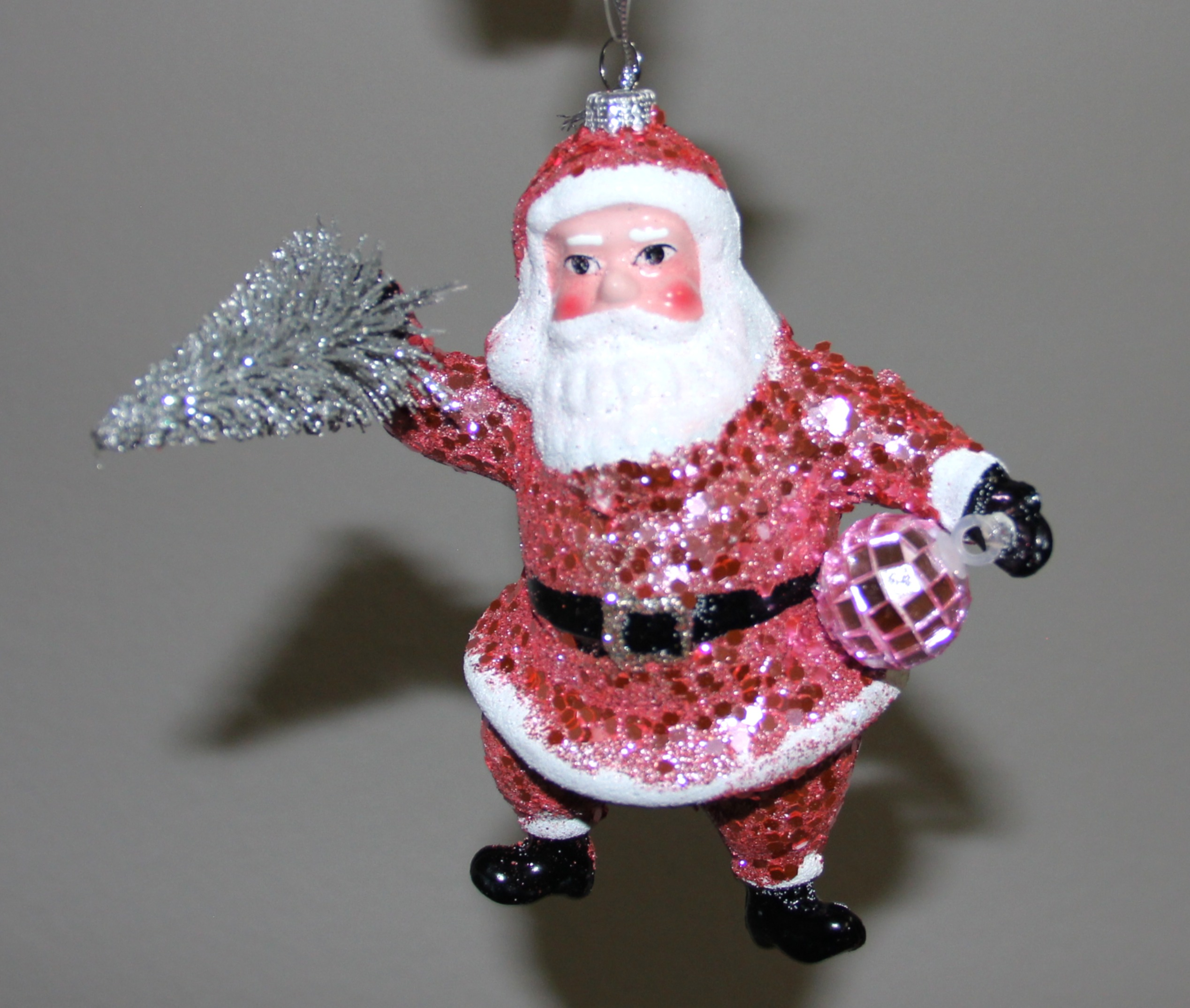
Disco Santa ornament typical of 2020s disco kitsch

Early appearances of the disco ball in popular culture include the films Berlin: Die Sinfonie der Großstadt (1927), Casablanca (1942), Love Me or Leave Me (1955), and Some Like It Hot (1959). Mirrorballs later became iconic during the disco era in films such as Saturday Night Fever. The disco ball has been utilised in contemporary films such as in a rave scene in Groove (2000), and a disco skull was used in Scooby-Doo (2002).

In music the disco ball has been featured on tours by artists such as U2, Yes, Paramore, and Madonna. On her first American tour Kylie Minogue opened her show standing atop a large disco skull as it descended from the ceiling to the stage. Disco balls have been featured on the album covers of Harry Styles' Kiss All the Time. Disco, Occasionally and Justin Timberlake's FutureSex/LoveSounds.

The Marvel Comics hero Dazzler has worn clothing inspired by disco balls.

The UK television series Strictly Come Dancing and its U.S. counterpart Dancing with the Stars award competition winners a "Glitter Ball Trophy" (UK) or "Mirror Ball Trophy" (U.S.).

The terms disco ball, mirror ball, and glitterball have been used to name songs, albums, and television episodes.

== Design and operation ==
A mirror ball typically consists of a lightweight spherical core, commonly made of plastic, foam, or metal, which is uniformly covered with hundreds or thousands of small mirrored facets. These mirrored tiles are usually made of glass or reflective acrylic and are arranged in a tight mosaic to maximise light reflection. When a focused light source, such as a pinspot or stage spotlight, is directed at the ball, each mirror facet reflects a beam of light, producing a pattern of moving dots that spread across surrounding surfaces.

Most mirror balls are mounted on a rotating motor that slowly turns the sphere, enhancing the dynamic light effect. Standard rotation speeds range from 0.5 to 3 revolutions per minute, though variable-speed and remote-controlled motors are also available. The resulting visual effect depends on several factors: the intensity and angle of the light source, the distance between the light and the ball, and the size of the mirrored facets.

Mirror balls have also been adapted into unique shapes (including sharks and skulls) and clothing designs.

== Records ==
English rock band Pink Floyd used a glitter ball on their A Momentary Lapse of Reason Tour of 1987 and The Division Bell Tour of 1994. The glitter ball on the former was somewhat larger than normal but nowhere near as large as the glitter ball on the 1994 tour. This particular glitter ball is one of the largest in the world: 4.90 metres in diameter, rising to a height of 21.3 metres before opening to a width of 7.3 metres, revealing a 12-kilowatt Phoebus HMI lamp. Both can be seen on the video of each tour, Delicate Sound of Thunder and Pulse, during the song "Comfortably Numb".

American singer-songwriter Madonna has used glitter balls in several of her tours. During The Girlie Show in 1993 she descended while sitting on one before performing "Express Yourself", and later in 2006 she used a 2-ton glitter ball that was embellished by $2 million worth of Swarovski crystals, which used a hydraulic system to open like flower petals for her entrance during her Confessions Tour.

Despite claims that the world's largest disco ball can be found on the promenade in Blackpool, England, it is smaller than the Guinness World Record-holder which was made for the 2014 Bestival event in England and is 10.33 metres (33 ft 11 in) in diameter.
