= Sparkleball =

Light ball made of plastic cups

A sparkleball is an ornament handmade out of Christmas lights and cups, most usually plastic cups. (Sparkleballs have also been built from bottles and other vessels.) Instructions for making these illuminated spheres have been passed by word of mouth for fifty or more years, but their inventor and origin are a mystery. Today instructions can be found on numerous DIY sites online and on social media. Different methods can be used to attach the cups including soldering, cable ties, hot glue gun, and stapling with a plier stapler. One or more bulbs from a strand of lights is inserted through a hole in the cup bottoms, so each cup becomes a reflective chamber. The size and shape of the cup determine the size of the sparkleball. Distant relative of the disco ball and an American outsider craft, sparkleballs can be spotted all over the United States, particularly in campgrounds and during the holidays. The largest number of sparkleballs in one display is on the "Sparkleball Streets" of Fullerton, California during the holidays (1535 sparkleballs were counted in 2024 according to a local holiday sparkleball scavenger hunt). Residents of North Yale, Princeton, Union and Nutwood Avenues hang hundreds of sparkleballs from their trees after Thanksgiving, a tradition started by Bill and Don Bales.

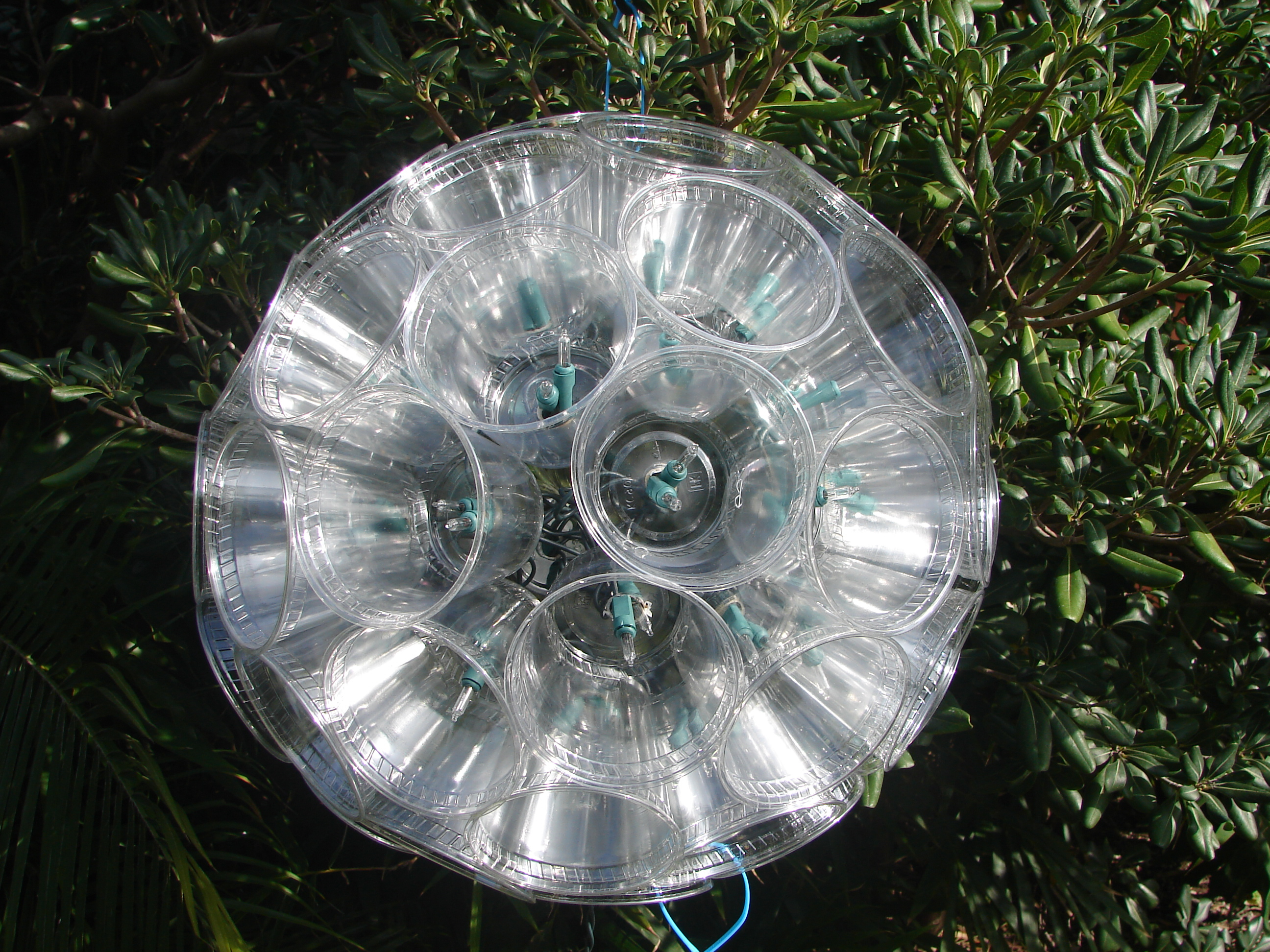

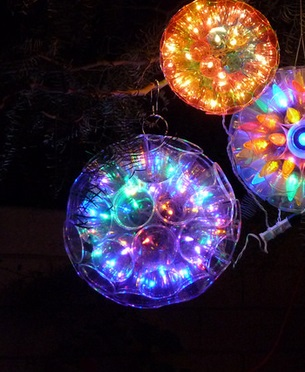

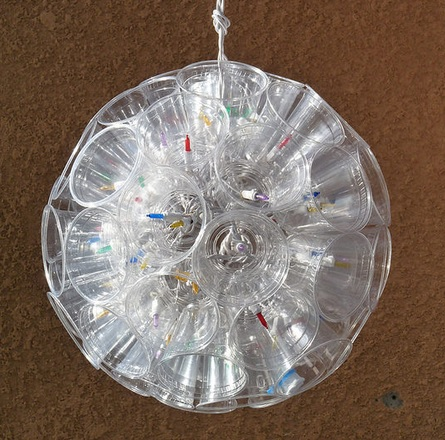

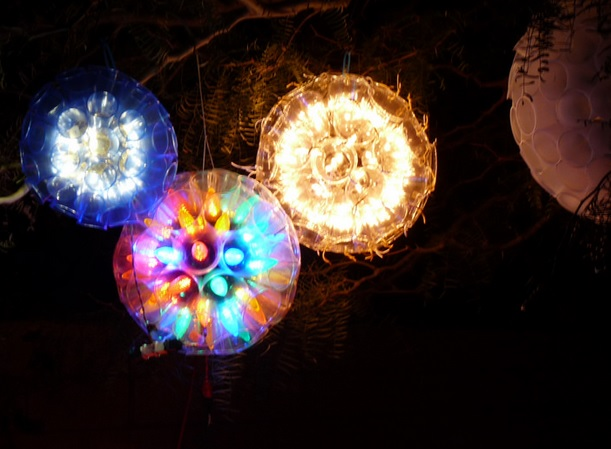

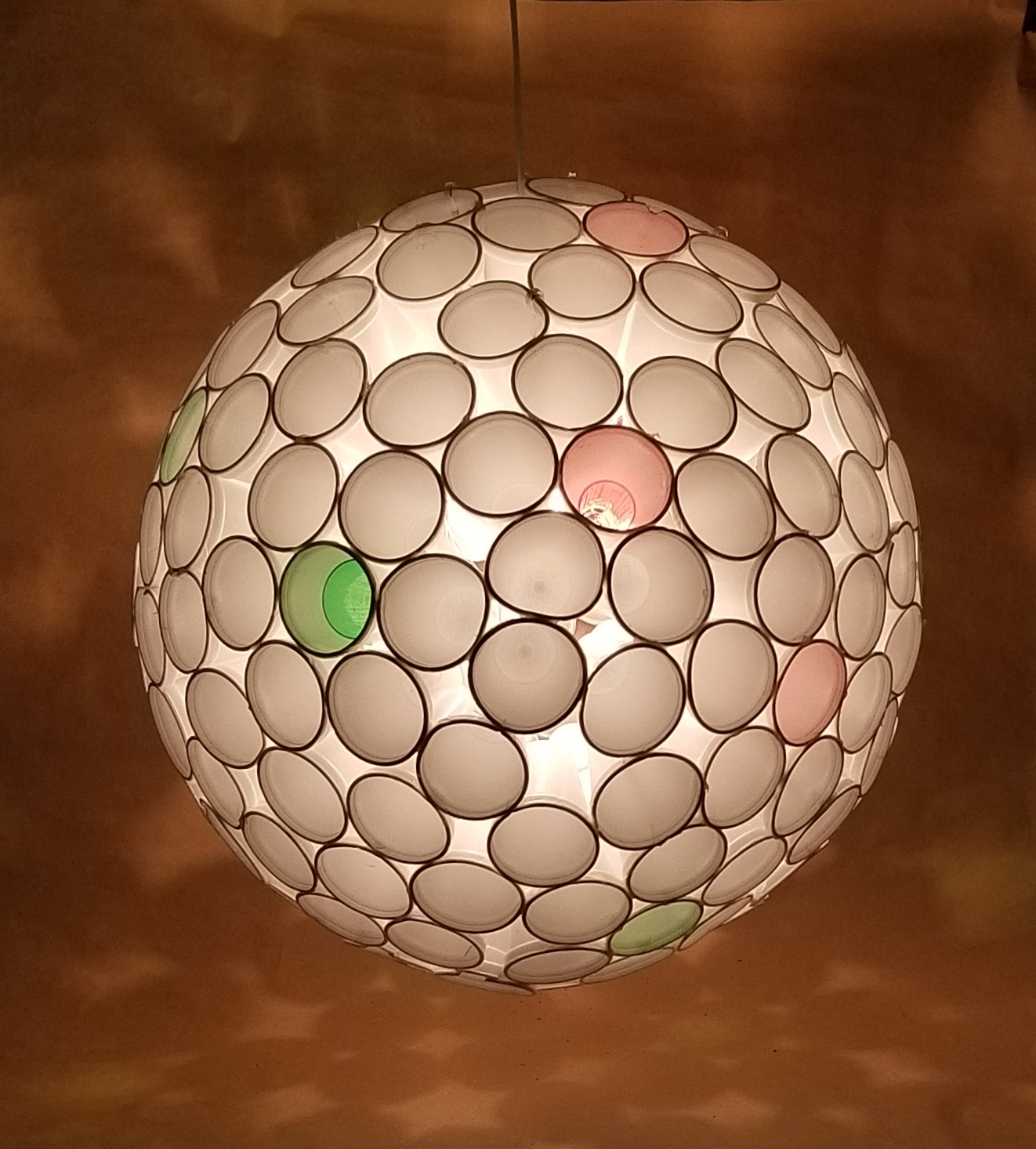
