= Twinkle bulb =

Light bulb which blinks on and off for decorative effect

A twinkle bulb is a special type of light bulb which blinks on and off for decorative effect. They are most commonly used on Christmas lights and other string lights, but can also be used for other ornamental purposes like electric jack-o-lanterns for Halloween and replica traffic lights.

== Incandescent ==
The original twinkle bulbs were C7½ and some C9¼ incandescent light bulbs with a bimetallic strip. Once the bulb warms up, the strip pulls slightly away from the contact, opening and interrupting the parallel circuit through the bulb and turning it off. The bulb then cools, allowing the strip to bend back and make contact again. This repeats at semi-random intervals ranging from several to less than half a second, and they may appear to speed up and slow down in a "cycle". Different bulbs may behave differently, even if purchased in the same package, due to minor manufacturing differences between each one. Since the trigger is thermal, blinking will be reduced or stop altogether if the lights are turned down with a dimmer.

When used across a large area such as a Christmas tree, the lights create a sparkling effect. Visitors to some department stores have likely seen these on displays, Macy's still uses them in its stores. Although now difficult to find for sale at local retailers, they are still available though online shopping.

=== Flasher bulbs ===
The advent of miniature lights found the adaptation of twinkle bulbs as flasher bulbs, which interrupt the entire series circuit of anywhere from 10 to 50 bulbs when powered from 120-volt mains electricity (in North America). These are easily recognizable by their red tips on an otherwise unpainted clear white bulb, and are available in the different voltages required for 10, 20, 35/70, and 50/100/150/200-light sets. Some older mini-light sets interlaced two circuits, putting all of the odd-numbered bulbs on one and the even-numbered ones on the other, allowing some lights to remain on while others between them blinked off. Some sets of 100 did this, others had the more common sequential (non-interlaced) setup but were advertised as "5-way flashing", having five circuits of 20 bulbs. These sometimes had a socket of a different color to indicate where each circuit began.

When placed in a battery-operated set, these bulbs will flash individually since these sets are wired in parallel. This also prolongs battery life since the bulbs are off part of the time. AC sets with shunts in their sockets such as NOMA "Stay Lit" will also blink individually as the shunt routes power around them.

=== Sparkling bulbs ===
During the late 20th century, flasher bulbs were modified such that the bimetallic strip is a "normally open" switch instead of a "normally closed" one. When first turned on, the strip does not make contact, causing power to flow through the filament until it warms up within a few seconds. It then makes and breaks contact quickly, momentarily allowing a low-resistance path around the filament, causing the bulb (and to a lesser extent the steady bulbs in reaction) to flicker rapidly, much faster than most flasher or twinkle bulbs.

These 6-volt bulbs were originally half of the bulbs in a 35-light set, alternated in every other socket with 6-volt steady bulbs (instead of the 3½-volt ones in a normal set of 35), and were sold under the General Electric brand and at Macy's under its own house brand, among others.

Ones sold in the 2010s were much more cheaply made, having the number twinkling bulbs reduced by 60% to just one in five, now being outnumbered by four times as many steady bulbs instead of being equal. These steady bulbs are the voltage that would be expected for the size of set or circuit, but still with 6-volt twinkle bulbs, and are available in larger sets like 70 and 100 (though not necessarily any longer than the older sets of 35 due to far shorter bulb spacing of today's cheap sets). Unlike the original sets, which frequently had different wedge bases on the two different bulb types to prevent too many sparkling bulbs from being used, modern sets generally do not enforce this with different sockets as there are so few twinkle bulbs to begin with.

== LEDs ==
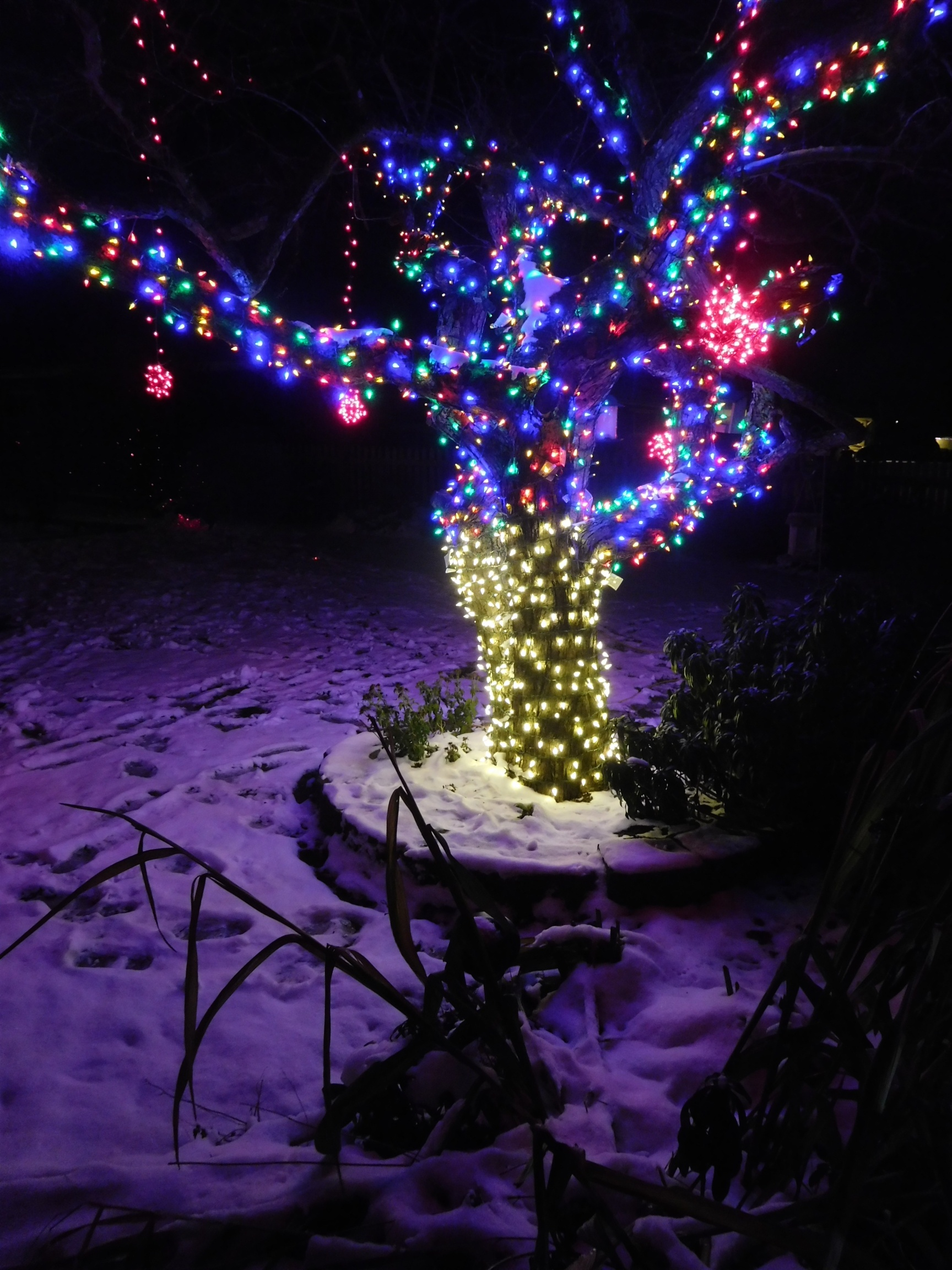
LED christmas lights

LEDs also have twinkling versions, though they contain an oscillator that alternates on and off at a very regular intervals rather than the irregular blinking of the thermal bimetallic strips. Dimmers or low batteries generally do not affect the twinkling interval, but as with incandescent bulbs, having them off part of the time extends battery life.

LEDs start blinking immediately upon being turned on, but slight manufacturing differences mean the frequency is slightly off between them, and the LEDs soon appear semi-random when there are several together. Small groups may sometimes converge and then diverge again in the way that a group of cars may have turn signals briefly appear synchronized while waiting to turn.

Variations include ones which alternate back and forth between two colors, often red and green, or blue and white. These actually have two LEDs with the single transparent chip package. Others have a more advanced control within the LED that can vary the brightness like a candle flame, or fade between two or three colors, but these are not twinkle bulbs strictly speaking, and are often used individually instead of in strings.

Synchronized flashing or color changes with a control box are not due to twinkle bulbs, but LED ones may have two colors wired in inverse parallel within each bulb to respond to changes in electrical polarity (and voltage for brightness) from the control box.

The use of blinking LEDs requires a supply of direct current (DC) such as an electrical battery, as the unaltered alternating current (AC) causes the oscillator to constantly reset. To prevent this issue, mains-powered lights usually have a small rectifier or capacitor (or both) in the plugs to smooth the electricity, which also prevents the light set from flickering with the frequency of the electricity. Some twinkling LED bulbs are able to operate without this, instead doing the conversion internally.
