= Greece's Next Top Model season 4 =

Greece's Next Top Model
- Season 4
- Judges: Ismini Papavlasopoulou; Angelos Bratis; Dimitris Skoulos; Genevieve Majari
- No. of contestants: 21
- Winner: Kyveli Hatziefstratiou
- No. of episodes: 30

Release
- Original network: Star Channel
- Original release: September 12 – December 20, 2021

Season chronology
- ← Previous; Season 3 Next → Season 5

The fourth season of Greece's Next Top Model (abbreviated as GNTMgr, also known as Greece's Next Top Model: Boys & Girls) premiered on September 12, 2021 on Star Channel. Like last season, boys can also participate.

Genevieve Majari, Angelos Bratis & Dimitris Skoulos return as judges, while Ismini Papavlasopoulou replaces Vicky Kaya as a judge.

The prizes for this season included a two-year modelling contract with Elite Model Management in London, a jewelry set from House of Jewels, an Opel Mokka and a cash prize of €50,000.

Like last year, there isn't any international destination due to COVID-19 pandemic.

The winner of the competition was 19-year-old Kyveli Hatziefstratiou.

== Cast ==
=== Contestants ===
(Ages stated are at start of contest)

Contestant	Age	Height	Hometown	Finish	Place
Stella Papadopoulou	19	1.73 m (5 ft 8 in)	Giannitsa	Episode 8	21
Ilias Aikaterinaris	26	1.84 m (6 ft 1/2 in)	Polygyros	Episode 10	20
Melina Rohrens	20	1.79 m (5 ft 10 1/2 in)	London, England	Episode 11	19 (quit)
Raphaela Rodinou	24	1.85 m (6 ft 1 in)	Rethymno	Episode 12	18
Thodoris Tsarouchas	32	1.77 m (5 ft 9 1/2 in)	Athens	Episode 13	17
Vasilis Parotidis	19	1.79 m (5 ft 10 1/2 in)	Athens	Episode 15	16 (quit)
Anna Valtatzi	19	1.65 m (5 ft 5 in)	Kavala	Episode 15	15
Emilianos Klaudianos	20	1.83 m (6 ft 0 in)	Kefalonia	Episode 18	14
Giannis Boutos	21	1.78 m (5 ft 10 in)	Athens	Episode 19	13
Ioanna Fragoulidou	22	1.69 m (5 ft 6 1/2 in)	Larissa	Episode 20	12
Thanos Dimitriou	25	1.85 m (6 ft 1 in)	Athens	Episode 21	11
Dinos Kritsis	21	1.80 m (5 ft 11 in)	Thessaloniki	Episode 22	10
Maria Koumara	19	1.72 m (5 ft 7 1/2 in)	Mytilini	Episode 23	9
Stylianos Floridis	29	1.89 m (6 ft 2 1/2 in)	Limassol, Cyprus	Episode 24	8
Napoleon Marios Mitsis	21	1.90 m (6 ft 3 in)	Ioannina	Episode 25	7
Agapi Brooks	18	1.79 m (5 ft 10 1/2 in)	Thessaloniki	Episode 26	6
Aggaios Pothitos	20	1.84 m (6 ft 1/2 in)	Athens	Episode 27	5
Eirini Lebesi	19	1.80 m (5 ft 11 in)	Athens	Episode 28	4
Konstantinos Tsagaris	21	1.79 m (5 ft 10 1/2 in)	Athens	Episode 30	3
Olga Ntalla	22	1.75 m (5 ft 9 in)	Piraeus	Episode 30	2
Kyveli Hatziefstratiou	19	1.73 m (5 ft 8 in)	Corfu	Episode 30	1

=== Judges ===
- Ismini Papavlasopoulou
- Angelos Bratis
- Dimitris Skoulos
- Genevieve Majari

=== Other cast members ===
- George Karavas – mentor
- Genevieve Majari – art director

== Episode summaries ==
=== Episodes 1–5: Auditions ===
The show kicked off with the audition phase. Auditions took place in two different cities: Athens and Thessaloniki with all safety measures due to COVID-19 pandemic. The auditions aired for the first episodes of the show. During the auditions, the boys & girls had a brief interview with the judges while they also walked in swimwear, if asked. In order to advance, they needed a "yes" from at least 3 of the judges.

Wild Card
Judge	Contestant
Ismini Papavlasopoulou	Giannis Psipsilis
Angelos Bratis	Dominiki Mistridou
Genevieve Majari	Emmanouela Mpairektari
Dimitris Skoulos	Stamatina Mitilinaiou

=== Episodes 5–6: Bootcamp ===
First Part: ID catwalk

Second Part: Photoshoot

- Golden Pass Winner: Eirini Lempesi
- Featured photographer: Panagiotis Simopoulos

=== Episode 7: Hug ===
Original airdate: 28 September 2021

The 20 contestant arrive with their suitcases on the roof of a summer cinema and become spectators, along with the judges and their coach George Karavas to watch a magic clip: George and Ismini represent in a cinematic reference the longing for human contact, which was so deprived of the era of COVID-19. In one of the most interactive exit trials, contestants are called upon to suddenly come very close, overcome taboos and contractions, and express the romance of youthful love as they are set in pairs and try to prove, with their model poses and their acting ability that they are not accidental in the top 20, while they are photographed in the lens of Kosmas Koumianos.

The next day begins with anxiety for the first departure. They arrive to the model house and their first elimination located in a garden. Anna and Thanos got first call-out with Anna won the best photo, and Giannis, Ioanna, Stella & Thodoris landed in the bottom. Only this year, things are different as the safe contestants will get to save somebody who is in the bottom, resulting in Giannis & Stella being saced. In the end, Ioanna was the first to be eliminated. After the elimination, the remaining contestants moved into their model house.

- First call-out: Anna Valtatzi & Thanos Dimitriou
- Bottom four: Giannis Boutos, Ioanna Fragoulidou, Stella Papadopoulou & Thodoris Tsarouhas
- Saved: Giannis Boutos & Stella Papadopoulou
- Bottom two: Ioanna Fragoulidou & Thodoris Tsarouhas
- Eliminated: Ioanna Fragoulidou
- Featured photographer: Kosmas Koumianos

=== Episode 8: Rock 'n Roll ===
Original airdate: 4 October 2021

- First call-out: Napoleon Marios Mitsis
- Bottom three: Anna Valtatzi, Stella Papadopoulou & Thanos Dimitriou
- Saved: Thanos Dimitriou
- Bottom two: Anna Valtatzi & Stella Papadopoulou
- Eliminated: Stella Papadopoulou
- Featured photographer: Dimitrios Kleanthous

=== Episode 9: The Makeover ===
Original airdate: 5 October 2021

The contestants received their makeovers. There was no panel held.

- Challenge Winner: Olga Ntalla

=== Episode 10: Beach Party ===
Original airdate: 11 October 2021

- First call-out: Eirini Lempesi
- Bottom three: Ilias Aikaterinaris, Thodoris Tsarouhas & Vasilis Parotidis
- Saved: Thodoris Tsarouhas
- Bottom two: Ilias Aikaterinaris & Vasilis Parotidis
- Eliminated: Ilias Aikaterinaris
- Featured photographer: Panos Giannakopoulos

=== Episode 11: The Wave ===
Original airdate: 12 October 2021

- Quit: Melina Rohrens
- First call-out: Stylianos Floridis
- Featured photographer: Apostolis Koukousas

=== Episode 12: The Fluid Catwalk ===
Original airdate: 18 October 2021

- First call-out: Konstantinos Tsagaris
- Bottom three: Giannis Boutos, Maria Koumara & Raphaela Rodinou
- Saved: Maria Koumara
- Bottom two: Giannis Boutos & Raphaela Rodinou
- Eliminated: Raphaela Rodinou
- Featured photographer: Spyros Hamalis

=== Episode 13: Dynasty ===
Original airdate: 19 October 2021

- Challenge Winner: Kyveli Hatziefstratiou
- First call-out: Dinos Kritsis
- Bottom three: Anna Valtatzi, Thanos Dimitriou & Thodoris Tsarouhas
- Eliminated: Thodoris Tsarouhas
- Featured photographer: Joey Leo, Panagiotis Simopoulos

=== Episode 14: Mary Goes Around ===
Original airdate: 25 October 2021

- First call-out: Napoleon Marios Mitsis
- Bottom three: Kyveli Hatziefstratiou, Maria Koumara & Thanos Dimitriou
- Saved: Maria Koumara
- Bottom two: Kyveli Hatziefstratiou & Thanos Dimitriou
- Eliminated: Thanos Dimitriou
- Featured photographer: Panos Georgiou

=== Episode 15: Nightmares & Dreams ===
Original airdate: 26 October 2021

- Quit: Vasilis Parotidis
- First call-out: Dinos Kritsis
- Bottom three: Anna Valtatzi, Maria Koumara & Napoleon Marios Mitsis
- Saved: Maria Koumara
- Bottom two: Anna Valtatzi & Napoleon Marios Mitsis
- Eliminated: Anna Valtatzi

=== Episode 16: Farmers/Amish ===
Original airdate: 1 November 2021

- Entered: Emilianos Klaudianos
- Challenge Winner: Agapi Brooks
- First call-out: Kyveli Hatziefstratiou
- Bottom two: Dinos Kritsis & Giannis Boutos
- Eliminated: Dinos Kritsis
- Featured Photographer: Xander Romanov, Dimitrios Kleanthous

=== Episode 17: Fly Me To The Moon ===
Original airdate: 2 November 2021

- Challenge Winner: Maria Koumara
- First call-out: Kyveli Hatziefstratiou
- Bottom two: Aggaios Pothitos & Stylianos Floridis
- Eliminated: Aggaios Pothitos
- Featured Photographer: Nikos Maliakos

=== Episode 18: Rodeo ===
Original airdate: 8 November 2021

- Challenge Winner: Olga Ntalla
- First call-out: Olga Ntalla
- Bottom two: Emilianos Klaudianos & Giannis Boutos
- Eliminated: Emilianos Klaudianos
- Featured Photographer: Giorgos Kalfamanolis

=== Episode 19: Foureira Show ===
Original airdate: 9 November 2021

- Returned: Aggaios Pothitos, Dinos Kritsis, Ioanna Fragoulidou & Thanos Dimitriou
- First call-out: Konstantinos Tsagaris
- Bottom two: Giannis Boutos & Napoleon Marios Mitsis
- Eliminated: Giannis Boutos
- Featured Photographer: Mike Tsitas

=== Episode 20: The Cube ===
Original airdate: 15 November 2021

• Challenge winner: Ioanna Fragoulidou

- First call-out: Napoleon Marios Mitsis
- Bottom two: Dinos Kritsis & Ioanna Fragoulidou
- Eliminated: Ioanna Fragoulidou
- Featured Photographer: Xander Romanov

=== Episode 21: Horse Lovers ===
Original airdate: 16 November 2021

- Challenge Winner: Konstantinos Tsagaris
- First call-out: Eirini Lempesi
- Bottom two: Dinos Kritsis & Thanos Dimitriou
- Eliminated: Thanos Dimitriou
- Featured Photographer: Apostolis Koukousas

=== Episode 22: After Party Hunger ===
Original airdate: 22 November 2021

- First call-out: Olga Ntalla
- Bottom two: Dinos Kritsis & Stylianos Floridis
- Eliminated: Dinos Kritsis
- Featured Photographer: Nassia Stouraiti

=== Episode 23: The Message ===
Original airdate: 23 November 2021

- First call-out: Aggaios Pothitos
- Bottom two: Maria Koumara & Stylianos Floridis
- Eliminated: Maria Koumara
- Featured Photographer: Bill Georgoussis

=== Episode 24: Don't Let Go ===
Original airdate: 29 November 2021

- Challenge Winner: Olga Ntalla
- First call-out: Kyveli Hatziefstratiou
- Bottom two: Agapi Brooks & Stylianos Floridis
- Eliminated: Stylianos Floridis
- Featured Photographer: Panagiotis Simopoulos

=== Episode 25: Seven Sins ===
Original airdate: 30 November 2021

- Challenge Winner: Agapi Brooks
- First call-out: Olga Ntalla
- Bottom two: Eirini Lempesi & Napoleon Marios Mitsis
- Eliminated: Napoleon Marios Mitsis
- Featured Photographer: Giorgos Kasapidis

=== Episode 26: Bratlock ===
Original airdate: 6 December 2021

- First call-out: Konstantinos Tsagaris
- Bottom two: Agapi Brooks & Aggaios Pothitos
- Eliminated: Agapi Brooks
- Featured Photographer: Antonis Giamouris

=== Episode 27: Fashion Pilgrimage ===
Original airdate: 7 December 2021

- First call-out: Kyveli Hatziefstratiou
- Bottom two: Aggaios Pothitos & Eirini Lempesi
- Eliminated: Aggaios Pothitos
- Featured Photographer: Konstantinos & Petros Sofikitis

=== Episode 28: Discoballs ===
Original airdate: 13 December 2021

- First call-out: Kyveli Hatziefstratiou
- Bottom two: Eirini Lempesi & Konstantinos Tsagaris
- Eliminated: Eirini Lempesi
- Featured Photographer: Kosmas Koumianos

=== Episode 29: Breakfast At Tiffany's, Ballroom - Final Part 1 ===
Original airdate: 14 December 2021

Scores
Nº	Model	Judges' scores						Total Score
Nº	Model	Photo	Ismini	Angelos	Genevieve	Dimitris	Total	Total Score
1	Kyveli	1st	9	9	9	10	37	74
1	Kyveli	2nd	9	9	10	9	37	74
2	Konstantinos	1st	10	9	9	10	38	70
2	Konstantinos	2nd	7	8	9	8	32	70
3	Olga	1st	9	8	9	9	35	69
3	Olga	2nd	8	8	9	9	34	69

- Featured Photographer: Dimitris Skoulos

=== Episode 30: The Final Catwalk, Raise Your Glass - Final Part 2 ===
Original airdate: 20 December 2021

Scores
Nº	Model	Judges' scores						Previous Total	Public vote	Total Score
Nº	Model	#	Ismini	Angelos	Genevieve	Dimitris	Total	Previous Total	Public vote	Total Score
1	Kyveli	Catwalk	10	10	10	9	39	74	18	169
1	Kyveli	Ad Video	9	9	10	10	38	74	18	169
2	Olga	Catwalk	9	9	9	9	36	69	18	162
2	Olga	Ad Video	10	9	10	10	39	69	18	162
3	Konstantinos	Catwalk	9	9	10	9	37	70	4	150
3	Konstantinos	Ad Video	10	10	9	10	39	70	4	150

- Final three: Konstantinos Tsagaris, Kyveli Hatziefstratiou & Olga Ntalla
- Third place: Konstantinos Tsagaris
- Runner-up: Olga Ntalla
- Greece's Next Top Model: Kyveli Hatziefstratiou
- Featured Photographer: Panagiotis Simopoulos

== Results ==
Order	Episodes																						
Order	6	7	8	10	11	12	13	14	15	16 (Note: Due to Vasilis quitting previous episode, Emilianos who was eliminated as a semi-finalist was allowed to enter the competition in episode 16.)	17	18	19 (Note: In episode 19, Aggaios, Dinos, Ioanna & Thanos returned to the competition, they were selected by the head manager of Elite Model Management London.)	20	21	22	23	24	25	26	27	28	30
1	Eirini	Anna; Thanos	Napoleon	Eirini	Stylianos	Konstantinos	Dinos	Napoleon	Dinos	Kyveli	Kyveli	Olga	Konstantinos	Napoleon	Eirini	Olga	Aggaios	Kyveli	Olga	Konstantinos	Kyveli	Kyveli	Kyveli
2	Kyveli	Anna; Thanos	Olga	Giannis	Giannis	Thanos	Agapi	Agapi	Olga	Maria	Eirini	Maria	Kyveli	Olga	Aggaios	Agapi	Agapi	Olga	Agapi	Kyveli	Olga	Olga	Olga
3	Maria	Aggaios; Olga	Thodoris	Agapi	Agapi; Aggaios; Anna; Dinos; Eirini; Konstantinos; Kyveli; Maria; Napoleon; Olga; Raphaela; Thanos; Thodoris; Vasilis	Dinos	Olga	Konstantinos	Eirini	Eirini	Giannis	Napoleon	Olga	Agapi	Stylianos	Aggaios	Konstantinos	Konstantinos	Konstantinos	Olga	Konstantinos	Konstantinos	Konstantinos
4	Melina	Aggaios; Olga	Eirini	Thanos	Agapi; Aggaios; Anna; Dinos; Eirini; Konstantinos; Kyveli; Maria; Napoleon; Olga; Raphaela; Thanos; Thodoris; Vasilis	Aggaios	Kyveli	Aggaios	Agapi	Aggaios	Agapi	Eirini	Dinos	Aggaios	Napoleon	Eirini	Napoleon	Aggaios	Kyveli	Eirini	Eirini	Eirini	
5	Stylianos	Maria; Vasilis	Vasilis	Anna	Agapi; Aggaios; Anna; Dinos; Eirini; Konstantinos; Kyveli; Maria; Napoleon; Olga; Raphaela; Thanos; Thodoris; Vasilis	Thodoris	Stylianos	Giannis	Giannis	Stylianos	Napoleon	Kyveli	Aggaios	Eirini	Kyveli	Maria	Olga	Napoleon	Aggaios	Aggaios	Aggaios		
6	Giannis	Maria; Vasilis	Dinos	Konstantinos	Agapi; Aggaios; Anna; Dinos; Eirini; Konstantinos; Kyveli; Maria; Napoleon; Olga; Raphaela; Thanos; Thodoris; Vasilis	Stylianos	Napoleon	Vasilis	Aggaios	Agapi	Emilianos	Konstantinos	Agapi	Konstantinos	Konstantinos	Konstantinos	Kyveli	Eirini	Eirini	Agapi			
7	Napoleon	Dinos; Konstantinos	Raphaela	Dinos	Agapi; Aggaios; Anna; Dinos; Eirini; Konstantinos; Kyveli; Maria; Napoleon; Olga; Raphaela; Thanos; Thodoris; Vasilis	Napoleon	Konstantinos	Dinos	Kyveli	Emilianos	Konstantinos	Stylianos	Eirini	Stylianos	Maria	Napoleon	Eirini	Agapi	Napoleon				
8	Vasilis	Dinos; Konstantinos	Giannis	Raphaela	Agapi; Aggaios; Anna; Dinos; Eirini; Konstantinos; Kyveli; Maria; Napoleon; Olga; Raphaela; Thanos; Thodoris; Vasilis	Vasilis	Giannis	Olga	Stylianos	Olga	Maria	Agapi	Thanos	Kyveli	Olga	Kyveli	Stylianos	Stylianos					
9	Stella	Agapi; Stylianos	Agapi	Melina	Agapi; Aggaios; Anna; Dinos; Eirini; Konstantinos; Kyveli; Maria; Napoleon; Olga; Raphaela; Thanos; Thodoris; Vasilis	Eirini	Vasilis	Anna	Konstantinos	Napoleon	Olga	Giannis	Maria	Thanos	Agapi	Stylianos	Maria						
10	Konstantinos	Agapi; Stylianos	Melina	Napoleon	Agapi; Aggaios; Anna; Dinos; Eirini; Konstantinos; Kyveli; Maria; Napoleon; Olga; Raphaela; Thanos; Thodoris; Vasilis	Kyveli	Eirini	Stylianos	Maria	Konstantinos	Stylianos	Emilianos	Ioanna	Maria	Dinos	Dinos							
11	Thanos	Eirini; Napoleon	Kyveli	Olga	Agapi; Aggaios; Anna; Dinos; Eirini; Konstantinos; Kyveli; Maria; Napoleon; Olga; Raphaela; Thanos; Thodoris; Vasilis	Agapi	Maria	Eirini	Napoleon	Giannis	Aggaios		Stylianos	Dinos	Thanos								
12	Anna	Eirini; Napoleon	Aggaios	Kyveli	Agapi; Aggaios; Anna; Dinos; Eirini; Konstantinos; Kyveli; Maria; Napoleon; Olga; Raphaela; Thanos; Thodoris; Vasilis	Anna	Aggaios	Maria	Anna	Dinos			Napoleon	Ioanna									
13	Raphaela	Melina; Raphaela	Stylianos	Aggaios	Agapi; Aggaios; Anna; Dinos; Eirini; Konstantinos; Kyveli; Maria; Napoleon; Olga; Raphaela; Thanos; Thodoris; Vasilis	Olga	Anna; Thanos	Kyveli	Vasilis				Giannis										
14	Agapi	Melina; Raphaela	Konstantinos	Maria	Agapi; Aggaios; Anna; Dinos; Eirini; Konstantinos; Kyveli; Maria; Napoleon; Olga; Raphaela; Thanos; Thodoris; Vasilis	Maria	Anna; Thanos	Thanos															
15	Olga	Ilias; Kyveli	Maria	Stylianos	Agapi; Aggaios; Anna; Dinos; Eirini; Konstantinos; Kyveli; Maria; Napoleon; Olga; Raphaela; Thanos; Thodoris; Vasilis	Giannis	Thodoris																
16	Ioanna	Ilias; Kyveli	Ilias	Thodoris	Agapi; Aggaios; Anna; Dinos; Eirini; Konstantinos; Kyveli; Maria; Napoleon; Olga; Raphaela; Thanos; Thodoris; Vasilis	Raphaela																	
17	Aggaios	Giannis; Stella	Thanos	Vasilis	Melina																		
18	Thodoris	Giannis; Stella	Anna	Ilias																			
19	Dinos	Thodoris	Stella																				
20	Ilias	Ioanna																					

The contestant quit the competition
The contestant was eliminated
The contestant won the competition

=== Bottom two ===
Episode	Contestants	Eliminated
7	Ioanna & Thodoris	Ioanna
8	Anna & Stella	Stella
10	Ilias & Vasilis	Ilias
11	None	Melina
12	Giannis & Raphaela	Raphaela
13	Anna, Thanos & Thodoris	Thodoris
14	Kyveli & Thanos	Thanos
15	Anna & Napoleon	Vasilis
15	Anna & Napoleon	Anna
16	Dinos & Giannis	Dinos
17	Aggaios & Stylianos	Aggaios
18	Emilianos & Giannis	Emilianos
19	Giannis & Napoleon	Giannis
20	Dinos & Ioanna	Ioanna
21	Dinos & Thanos	Thanos
22	Dinos & Stylianos	Dinos
23	Maria & Stylianos	Maria
24	Agapi & Stylianos	Stylianos
25	Eirini & Napoleon	Napoleon
26	Agapi & Aggaios	Agapi
27	Aggaios & Eirini	Aggaios
28	Eirini & Konstantinos	Eirini
30	Konstantinos, Kyveli & Olga	
30	Konstantinos, Kyveli & Olga	Konstantinos
30	Konstantinos, Kyveli & Olga	Olga

The contestant quit the competition
The contestant was eliminated after their first time in the bottom two
The contestant was eliminated after their second time in the bottom two
The contestant was put through collectively to the next round
The contestant was eliminated after their third time in the bottom two
The contestant was eliminated after their fourth time in the bottom two
The contestant was eliminated in the final judging and placed third
The contestant was eliminated in the final judging and placed as the runner-up

=== Average call-out order ===
Episode 11 (except top two), 29 & 30 are not included.

Rank by average	Place	Model	Call-out total	Number of call-outs	Call-out average
1	2	Olga	89	20	4.45
2	3	Konstantinos	105	20	5.25
3	6	Agapi	95	18	5.28
4	4	Eirini	106	20	5.30
5	5	Aggaios	103	18	5.72
6	1	Kyveli	117	20	5.85
7	7	Napoleon	104	17	6.12
8	10	Dinos	79	12	6.58
9	14	Emilianos	23	3	7.67
10	8	Stylianos	135	17	7.94
11	13	Giannis	98	12	8.17
12	16	Vasilis	50	6	8.33
13	11	Thanos	79	9	8.78
14	9	Maria	133	15	8.87
15	15	Anna	70	7	10.00
16	19	Melina	32	3	10.67
17	18	Raphaela	44	4	11.00
18	17	Thodoris	58	5	11.60
19	12	Ioanna	42	3	14.00
20	20	Ilias	49	3	16.33
21	21	Stella	36	2	18.00

== Photo shoots ==
- Episode 6 photo shoot: Sexy Car Washers (semifinals)
- Episode 7 photo shoot: Romance in Pairs
- Episode 8 photo shoot: Rock n' Roll in the Sky
- Episode 10 photo shoot: Beach Party in pairs
- Episode 11 photo shoot: The Human Wave
- Episode 12 photo shoot: The Fluid Catwalk in pairs
- Episode 13 photo shoot: Dynasty
- Episode 14 photo shoot: Mary Goes Around
- Episode 15 Runway shoot: Nightmares & Dreams
- Episode 16 photo shoot: Posing as Farmers/Amish in pairs
- Episode 17 photo shoot: Fly Me To The Moon
- Episode 18 photo shoot: Posing on a Rodeo Bull for COOLVIT
- Episode 19 photo shoot: Foureira Runway Show
- Episode 20 photo shoot: Posing in a spinning Cube
- Episode 21 photo shoot: Riding a horse in the lake Doxa
- Episode 22 photo shoot: Luxury with Ismini by the food truck
- Episode 23 photo shoot: The message
- Episode 24 photo shoot: Underwater posing with statue
- Episode 25 photo shoot: Seven sins
- Episode 26 photo shoot: Bratlock
- Episode 27 photo shoot: Fashion Pilgrimage
- Episode 28 photo shoot: Posing in a Club with Discoballs
- Episode 29 photo shoots: Breakfast at Tiffany´s and Ballroom

== Ratings ==
No. in series	No. in season	Episode	Air date	Timeslot (EET)	Ratings	Viewers (in millions)	Rank		Share		Source
No. in series	No. in season	Episode	Air date	Timeslot (EET)	Ratings	Viewers (in millions)	Daily	Weekly	Household	Adults 18-54	Source
127	1	"Auditions, Part 1"	September 12, 2021	Sunday 9:00pm	6,8%	0,706	#2	#12	16,0%	22,8%	
128	2	"Auditions, Part 2"	September 13, 2021	Monday 9:00pm	6,2%	0,643	#3	#12	14,1%	20,5%	
129	3	"Auditions, Part 3"	September 14, 2021	Tuesday 9:00pm	5,8%	0,603	#3	#14	13,7%	20,7%	
130	4	"Auditions, Part 4"	September 20, 2021	Monday 9:00pm	7,0%	0,727	#3	#14	16,1%	23,7%	
131	5	"Auditions, Part 5 - Bootcamp: ID catwalk"	September 21, 2021	Tuesday 9:00pm	6,6%	0,685	#3	#16	15,9%	21,5%	
132	6	"Bootcamp: Photoshoot"	September 27, 2021	Monday 9:00pm	5,7%	0,586	#4	—N/a^{1}	12,4%	18,5%	
133	7	"Hug"	September 28, 2021	Tuesday 9:00pm	6,0%	0,619	#5	—N/a^{1}	13,5%	20,4%	
134	8	"Rock n' Roll"	October 4, 2021	Monday 9:00pm	—N/a^{2}			—N/a^{1}	11,5%	16,2%	
135	9	"The Makeover"	October 5, 2021	Tuesday 9:00pm	6,0%	0,623	#5	—N/a^{1}	12,6%	19,3%	
136	10	"Beach Party"	October 11, 2021	Monday 9:00pm	5,8%	0,596	#7	—N/a^{1}	13,4%	18,8%	
137	11	"The Wave"	October 12, 2021	Tuesday 9:00pm	—N/a^{2}			—N/a^{1}	10,4%	16,9%	
138	12	"The Fluid Catwalk"	October 18, 2021	Monday 9:00pm	4,6%	0,481	#10	—N/a^{1}	11,7%	15,6%	
139	13	"Dynasty"	October 19, 2021	Tuesday 9:00pm	4,9%	0,505	#10	—N/a^{1}	11,7%	17,5%	
140	14	"Mary Goes Around"	October 25, 2021	Monday 9:00pm	—N/a^{2}			—N/a^{1}	11,1%	16,0%	
141	15	"Nightmares & Dreams"	October 26, 2021	Tuesday 9:00pm	—N/a^{2}			—N/a^{1}	11,1%	16,5%	
142	16	"Farmers/Amish"	November 1, 2021	Monday 9:00pm	—N/a^{2}			—N/a^{1}	10,9%	15,1%	
143	17	"Fly Me To The Moon"	November 2, 2021	Tuesday 9:00pm	—N/a^{2}			—N/a^{1}	11,7%	16,5%	
144	18	"Rodeo"	November 8, 2021	Monday 9:00pm	—N/a^{2}			—N/a^{1}	10,1%	14,7%	
145	19	"Foureira Show"	November 9, 2021	Tuesday 9:00pm	—N/a^{2}			—N/a^{1}	10,6%	15,3%	
146	20	"The Cube"	November 15, 2021	Monday 9:00pm	—N/a^{2}			—N/a^{1}	10,5%	15,1%	
147	21	"Horse Lovers"	November 16, 2021	Tuesday 9:00pm	—N/a^{2}			—N/a^{1}	10,1%	13,9%	
148	22	"After Party Hunger"	November 22, 2021	Monday 9:00pm	—N/a^{2}			—N/a^{1}	10,1%	13,4%	
149	23	"The Message"	November 23, 2021	Tuesday 9:00pm	—N/a^{2}			—N/a^{1}	10,4%	13,9%	
150	24	"Don't Let Go"	November 29, 2021	Monday 9:00pm	—N/a^{2}			—N/a^{1}	10,8%	14,6%	
151	25	"Seven Sins"	November 30, 2021	Tuesday 9:00pm	—N/a^{2}			—N/a^{1}	10,1%	14,1%	
152	26	"Bratlock"	December 6, 2021	Monday 9:00pm	—N/a^{2}			—N/a^{1}	9,0%	12,5%	
153	27	"Fashion Pilgrimage"	December 7, 2021	Tuesday 9:00pm	—N/a^{2}			—N/a^{1}	10,1%	14,7%	
154	28	"Discoballs"	December 13, 2021	Monday 9:00pm	—N/a^{2}			—N/a^{1}	10,1%	14,2%	
155	29	"Final - Part 1"	December 14, 2021	Tuesday 9:00pm	—N/a^{2}			—N/a^{1}	10,4%	13,8%	
156	30	"Final - Part 2"	December 20, 2021	Monday 9:00pm	5,8%	0,599	#10	—N/a^{1}	13,3%	18,4%	

Note

1. Outside top 20.
2. Outside top 10.
