= Disko =

Disko may refer to:

- Disko Island or Qeqertarsuaq, in Baffin Bay, Greenland
- Disko, Indiana, a small town in the United States
- The character Disko Troop in the book Captains Courageous
- Disk'O, a type of amusement ride manufactured by Zamperla
- Disko (song), a song by Last Pizza Slice that was the Slovenian entry in the Eurovision Song Contest 2022

== See also ==
- Disco
