= Disco: A Decade of Saturday Nights =

- Date: 2004
- Location: United States
- Theme: Disco
- Organised by: Experience Music Project

Disco: A Decade of Saturday Nights, organized by Experience Music Project in Seattle, Washington, was the first major museum exhibition to explore the rich, complex world of disco. Pulsating with light and sound, the exhibit followed disco from its beginnings in New York club culture to the fad created by Saturday Night Fever, the ensuing backlash, and disco's influential afterlife.

The show included the drum kit used by Earl Young, the inventor of the disco beat; the Plexiglas guitar played by Nile Rodgers of Chic; one of Saturday Night Fever's famous white suits; a selection of photographs taken by Andy Warhol at Studio 54; video clips of Disco Step-by-Step Television Show, and rare artifacts from legendary nightspots ranging from The Loft to the Paradise Garage. Artists represented Donna Summer, Grace Jones, the Bee Gees, Sylvester James, A Taste of Honey, and many more. With help from a group of expert consultants (Marty Angelo, Nicky Siano, etc.) led by Vince Aletti, the first journalist to write nationally about disco in 1973, the exhibit helped to change people's thinking about a musical genre that has been hugely important and hugely misunderstood.

The exhibit made stops at the Henry Ford Museum in Dearborn, Michigan in 2004 and the New York Public Library for the Performing Arts in New York City in 2005. The exhibit is currently retired.
