= Bubble light =

Bubbling decorative light

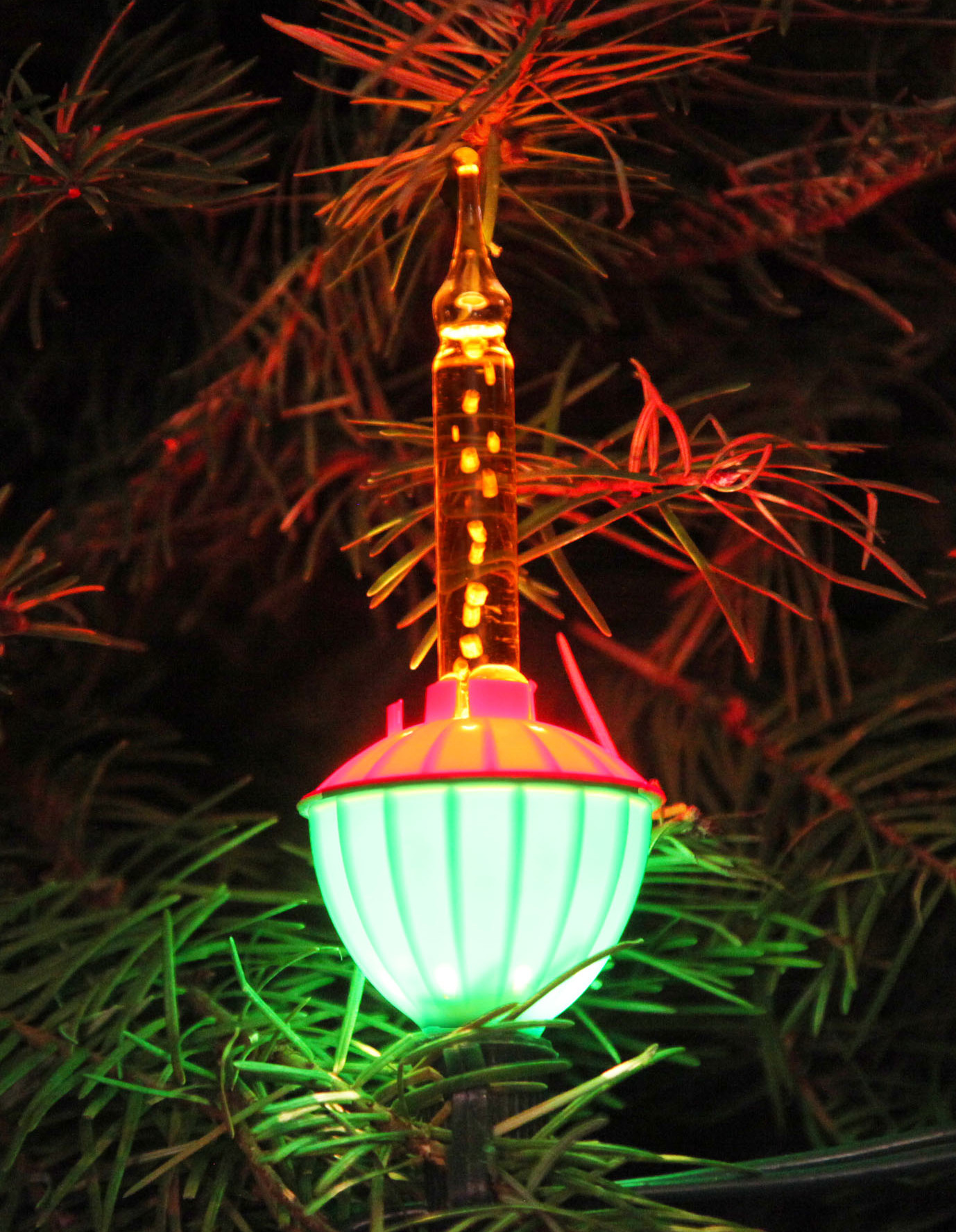
Common screw-in bubble light

A bubble light is a decorative device consisting of a liquid-filled vial that is heated and illuminated by an incandescent light bulb. Because of the liquid's low boiling point, 39.6°C (103.3°F), the modest heat generated by the lamp causes the liquid to boil and bubble up from the vial's base thus creating a decorative effect.

== Process ==
A candelabra base 120-volt bubble light candle in operation

The liquid is almost always methylene chloride, a toxic solvent. It is generally sealed in a glass vial or capsule to prevent its release; if it is broken, the area should be evacuated until the fumes have dissipated. Some early bubble lights instead used a lightweight oil or camphor (a white substance used in some mothballs) to create the low boiling point. In these older lamps, one can often see a white piece floating at the top of the vial, until the heat of the lamp dissolves it and it starts to bubble.

The light from the lamp illuminates the bubbles from underneath, causing them to shine. Bubble lights of all kinds operate best when the top of the tube is significantly cooler than the bottom, thus increasing the temperature gradient. The tubes must be kept upright, and occasionally may need to be tapped or even shaken to begin bubbling after warming up.

== Designs ==
Bubble lights have been made in two different lamp base sizes—E10 (C6) 15 volt, and E12 (C7). The original design used a miniature screw base (E10), such as those used on C6 cone-shaped Christmas lamps. For 120 V power, these early designs were nominally designed to operate with eight on one string, in series, at 15 volts each. However, they were often packaged with a nine-socket string to extend the life of the bulbs. Bubble lights could also be purchased individually for use in existing light strings. Modern incarnations either use candelabra base (E12) 120-volt bulbs, or push-in wedge base "midget" size miniature bulbs (most commonly ten 12-volt bulbs wired in series).

The clear light bulb is enclosed in a plastic base made up of a "bowl" and a "cap", usually of different colors. Bubble lights are manufactured in just about any color, including the liquid in the tube. The plastics used are most commonly semi-opaque red, yellow, blue, and green. Liquids are generally amber, red, blue, green, and rarely, purple or pink. Uncolored liquid is also available, being lit with colored bulbs instead.

In recent years, bubble lights have become more elaborate in appearance. Glitter is sometimes added to the vials for extra sparkle, most commonly on specialty types such as those used in decorative nightlights. Bases are now often made to look like figures such as Santa Clauses or snowmen, or decorative objects and symbols, rather than the plain ribbed plastic. Like many other Christmas decorations, they have been converted for Halloween use, usually with orange-colored liquid and a base that looks like a jack-o'-lantern, or the head of a black cat or witch, among other Halloween symbols.

Less-toxic modern imitations of bubble lights are made from acrylic or other clear plastic rods, with permanent bubbles deliberately manufactured into them, lit with fixed-color or color-changing LEDs. Other bubbling lights are much larger and sit on a table or floor, occasionally with fake fish which "swim" up and down as they change buoyancy. These tubes are usually filled with distilled water, and have one or more airstones at the bottom, and normally a light, along with an air pump.

== History ==
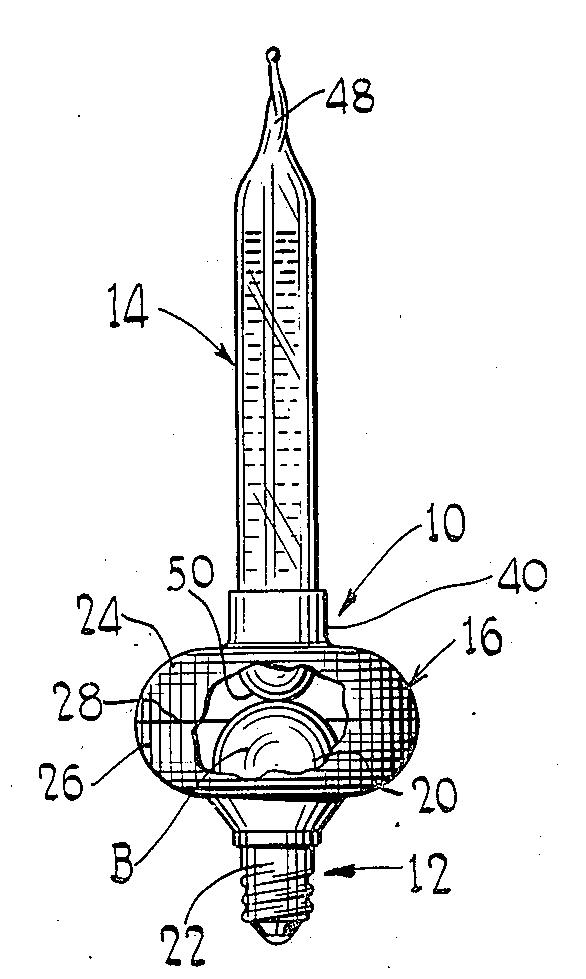
A Christmas bubble light, as depicted in a drawing in U.S. patent 2,353,063

Bubble lights for Christmas decoration were first patented in the United States by Carl W. Otis in 1944 and introduced there in 1946 by NOMA, one of the largest American manufacturers of Christmas lights. While NOMA was the largest company to make these lights, other manufacturers included Raylite (Paramount/Sterling), Royal Electric Company, and Good Lite/Peerless. Bubble lights were very popular as Christmas lights from the 1940s through the 1970s, before miniature "fairy" lights became popular.

== See also ==
- Drinking bird – Novelty toy heat engine
- Hand boiler
- Lava lamp – Decorative lamp
- Percolator – Coffee brewing device
- Plasma globe – Decorative electrical device

== Patents ==
- US Pat. No. 2,353,063: July 4, 1944
- US Pat. No. 2,031,409: February 18, 1936
- US Pat. No. 2,031,416: February 18, 1936
- US Pat. No. 2,162,897: June 20, 1939
- US Pat. No. 2,174,446: September 26, 1939
