= Disco Inferno (disambiguation) =

"Disco Inferno" is a song by The Trammps.

Disco Inferno may also refer to:

- Disco Inferno (album), a 1976 disco album recorded by The Trammps which includes the song
- Disco Inferno (band), a band formed in the late 1980s
- Disco Inferno (musical), a 2006 musical set in the 1970s
- Disco Inferno (wrestler) (born 1967), American professional wrestler born Glenn Gilbertti
- "Disco Inferno" (50 Cent song), a 2004 song by 50 Cent
- "Disco Inferno" (Cold Case), a 2004 television episode
- "Disco Inferno" (Quantum Leap), a 1989 television episode
- "Disco Inferno", a 2016 track by Perturbator
- ”Disco Inferno”, a Latin phrase meaning "I learn in/from hell" depending of the interpretation of the dative/ablative case of "infernum" which can be freely translated as "I learn through suffering" as originated on Tumblr.
