= Discount =

Discount may refer to:

== Arts and entertainment ==
- Discount (band), punk rock band that formed in Vero Beach, Florida in 1995 and disbanded in 2000
- Discount (film), French comedy-drama film
- "Discounts" (song), 2020 single by American rapper Cupcakke

== Economics and business ==
- Discounts and allowances, reductions in the basic prices of goods or services
- Discounting, a financial mechanism in which a debtor obtains the right to delay payments to a creditor
- Delay discounting, the decrease in perceived value of receiving a good at a later date compared with receiving it at an earlier date
- Discount store
