= Christmas ornament =

Decoration typically placed on a Christmas tree

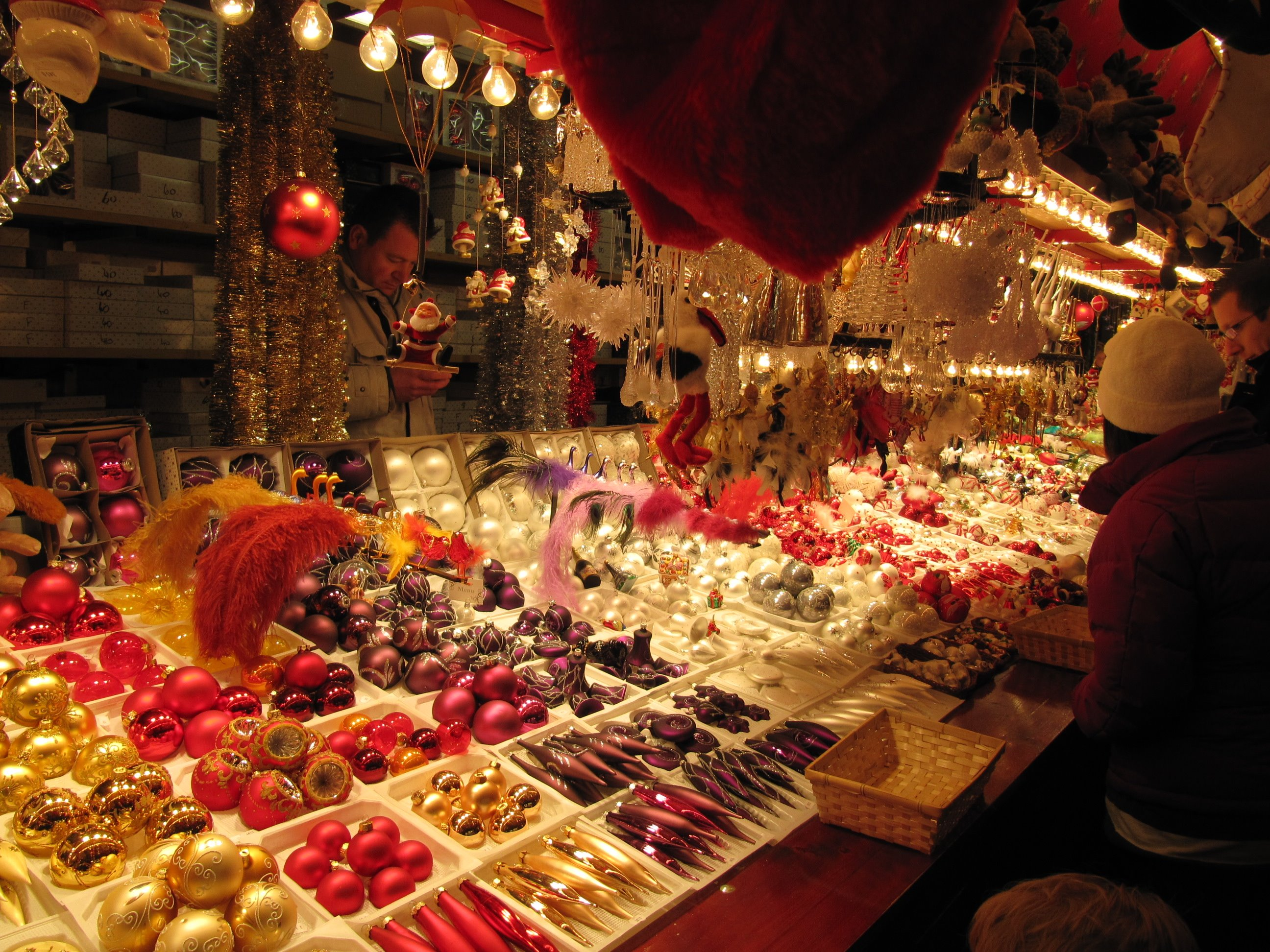
Glass ornaments

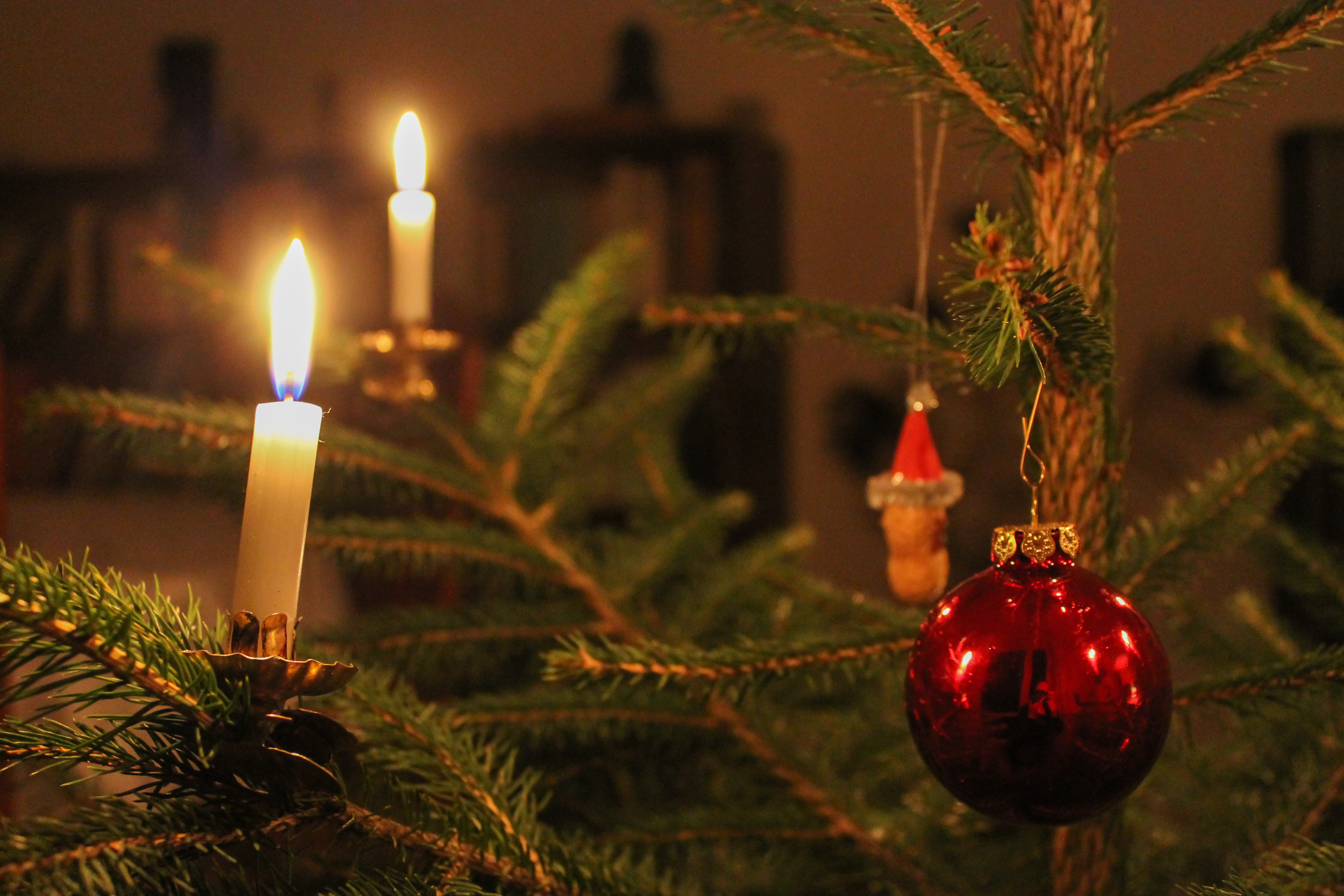
Christmas tree lights and Christmas bulb

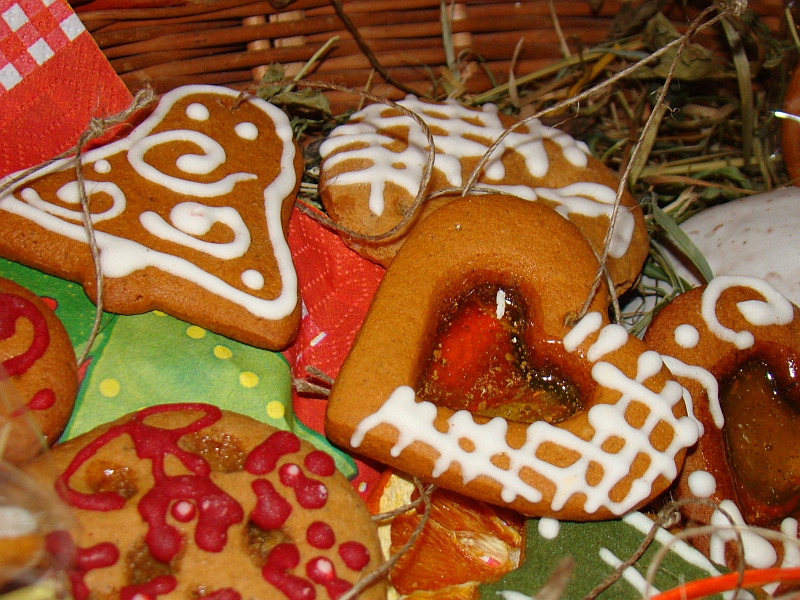
Piernik ornaments in Poland

Christmas ornaments, baubles, or globes are decoration items, usually to decorate Christmas trees. These decorations may be woven, blown (glass or plastic), molded (ceramic or metal), carved from wood or expanded polystyrene, or made by other techniques. They may come in a variety of spherical shapes such as balls or tiny figurines.

Ornaments are almost always reused year after year rather than purchased annually, and family collections often contain a combination of commercially produced ornaments and decorations created by family members. Such collections are often passed on and augmented from generation to generation. Festive figures and images are commonly preferred.

Lucretia P. Hale's story "The Peterkins' Christmas-Tree" offers a short catalog of the sorts of ornaments used in the 1870s:

There was every kind of gilt hanging-thing, from gilt pea-pods to butterflies on springs. There were shining flags and lanterns, and bird-cages, and nests with birds sitting on them, baskets of fruit, gilt apples, and bunches of grapes.

The modern-day mold-blown colored glass Christmas ornament was invented in the small German town of Lauscha in the mid-16th century.

== History ==
=== Invention ===
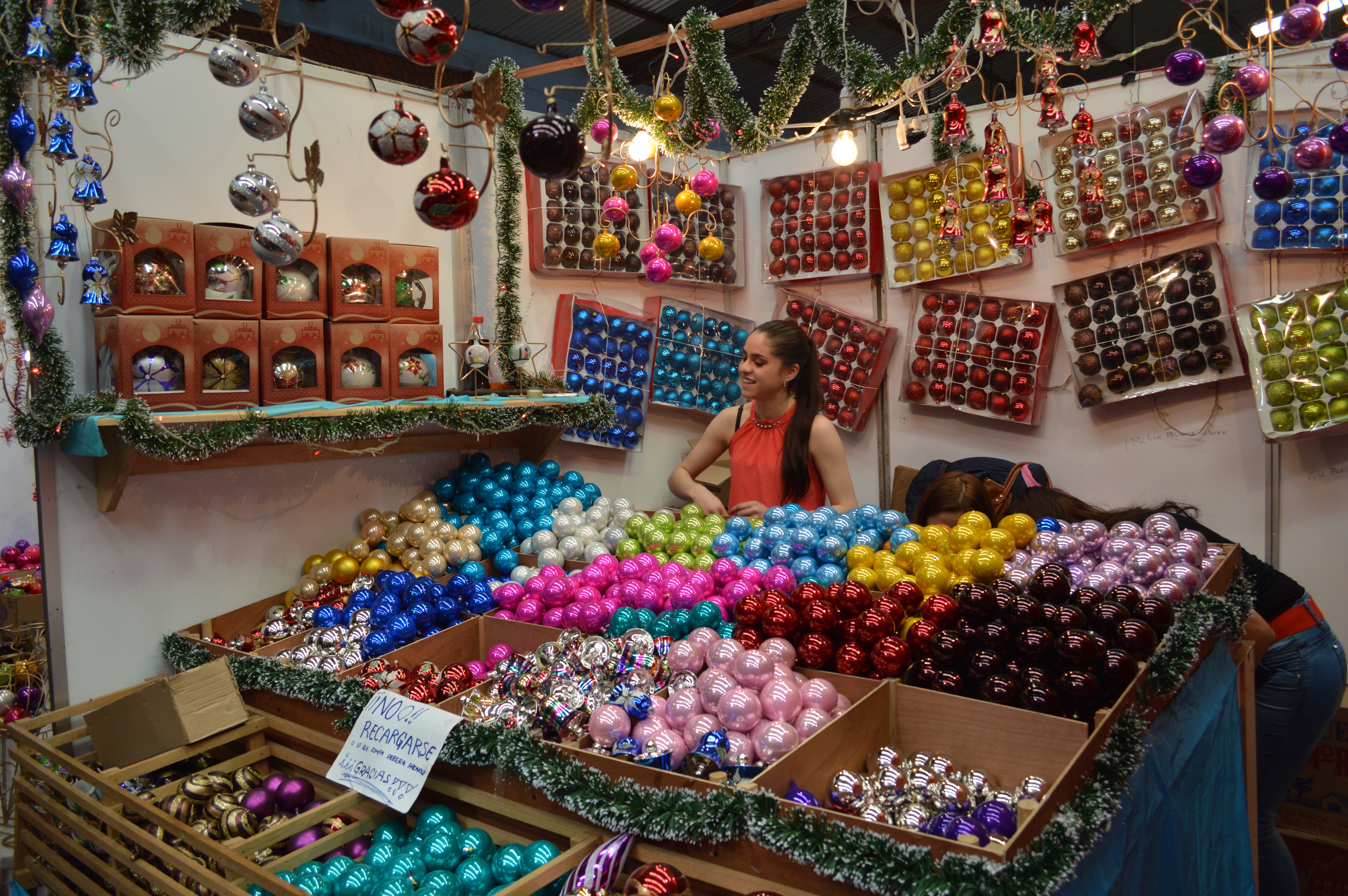
Blown glass baubles for sale in Tlalpujahua, Michoacán, Mexico. The town is known for its production of Christmas ornaments.

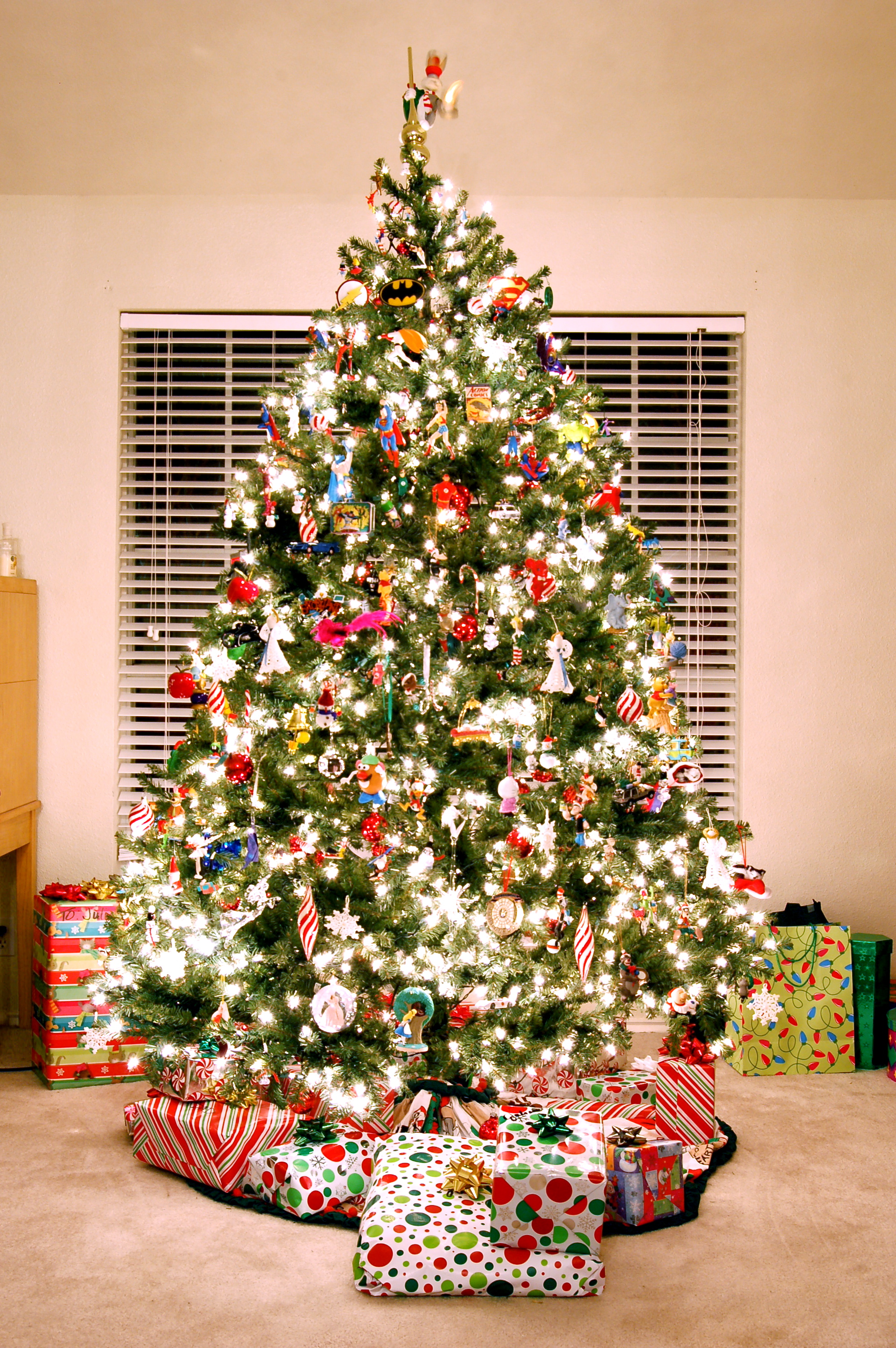
A fully decorated Christmas tree

The first decorated trees were adorned with apples, white candy canes, and pastries in the shapes of stars, hearts and flowers. Glass baubles were first made in Lauscha, Germany, by Hans Greiner, who produced garlands of glass beads and tin figures that could be hung on trees. The popularity of these decorations grew into the production of glass figures made by highly skilled artisans with clay molds.

The artisans heated a glass tube over a flame, then inserted the tube into a clay mold, blowing the heated glass to expand into the shape of the mold. The original ornaments were only in the shape of fruits and nuts.

After the glass cooled, a silver nitrate solution was swirled into it, a silvering technique developed in the 1850s by Justus von Liebig. After the nitrate solution dried, the ornament was hand-painted and topped with a cap and hook.

=== Export ===
Other glassblowers in Lauscha recognised the growing popularity of Christmas baubles and began producing them in various designs. Soon, the whole of Germany started to buy Christmas glassware from Lauscha. On Christmas Eve 1832, a young Victoria wrote about her delight at having a tree, hung with lights, ornaments, and presents placed round it. In the 1840s, after a picture of Victoria's Christmas tree was shown in a London newspaper decorated with glass ornaments and baubles from her husband Prince Albert's native Germany, Lauscha began exporting its products throughout Europe.

In the 1880s, American F. W. Woolworth discovered Lauscha's baubles during a visit to Germany. He made a fortune by importing the German glass ornaments to the United States.

=== Mass production ===
William DeMuth created the first American-made glass ornaments in New York in 1870. In 1880, Woolworth's began selling Lauscha glass ornaments. Other stores began selling Christmas ornaments by the late 19th century and by 1910, Woolworth's had gone national with over 1000 stores bringing Christmas ornaments across America. New suppliers popped up everywhere including Dresden die-cut fiberboard ornaments which were popular among families with small children.

By the 20th century, Woolworth's had imported 200,000 ornaments and topped $25 million in sales from Christmas decorations alone. As of 2009, the Christmas decoration industry ranks second to gifts in seasonal sales.

Many silver companies, such as Gorham, Wallace, Towle, Lunt and Reed & Barton, began manufacturing silver Christmas ornaments in 1970 and 1971.

In 1973, Hallmark Cards started manufacturing Christmas ornaments. The first collection included 18 ornaments, including six glass ball ornaments. The Hallmark Keepsake Ornament collection is dated and available for just one year. By 1998, 11 million American households collected Hallmark ornaments, and 250,000 people were member of the Keepsake Ornament Collector's Club. There were as many as 400 local Keepsake Ornament Collector's Club chapters in the US. One noted Christmas ornament authority is Clara Johnson Scroggins who has written extensively on the topic and has one of the largest private collections of Christmas ornaments.

In 1996, the ornament industry generated $2.4 billion in total annual sales, an increase of 25% over the previous year. Industry experts estimated more than 22 million US households collected Christmas ornaments, and that 75% of those households collected Hallmark Keepsake Ornaments.

=== Post–World War II ===
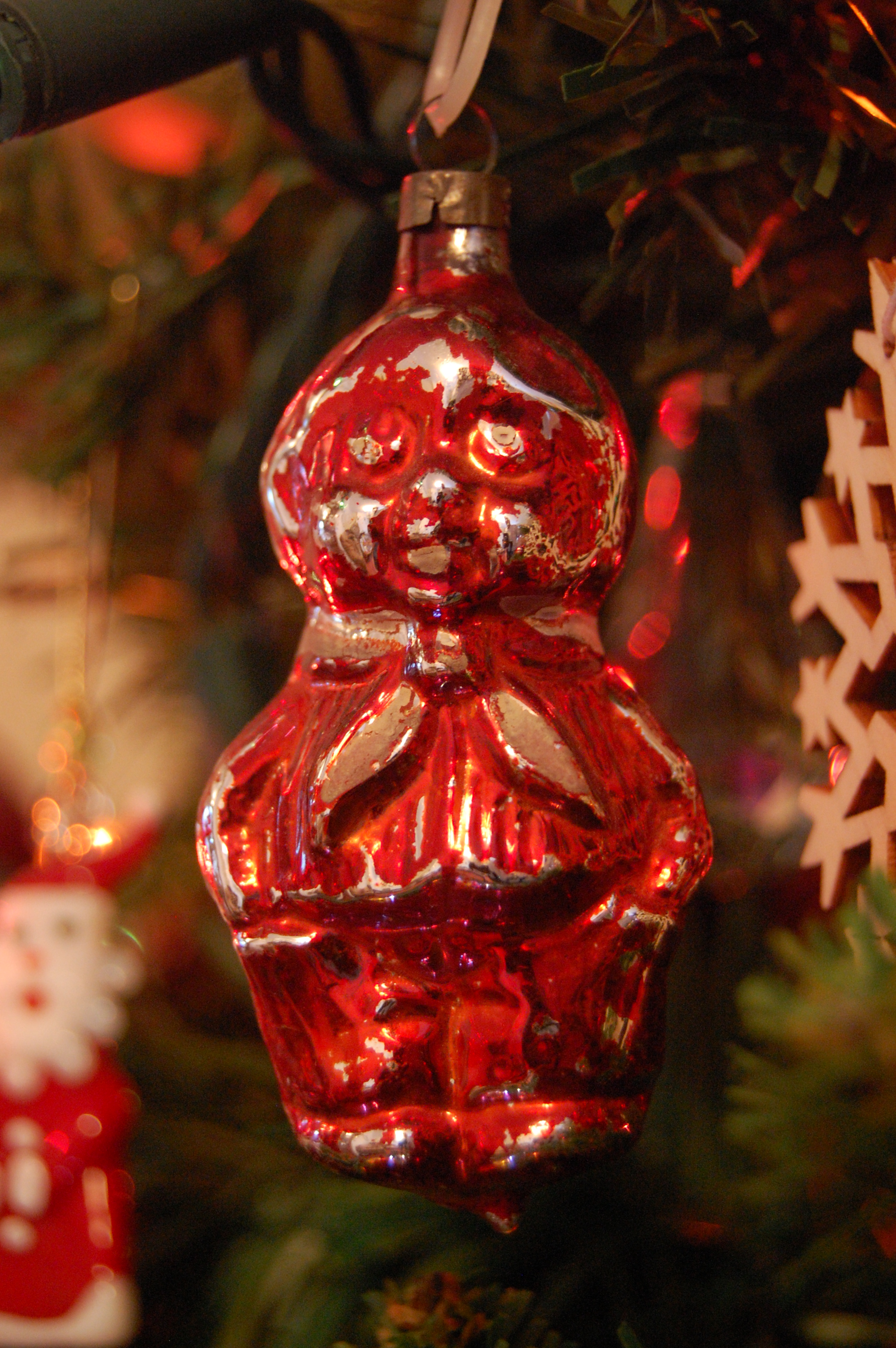
A teddy bear bauble purchased in England in 1959

After World War II, the East German government turned most of Lauscha's glassworks into state-owned entities, and production of baubles in Lauscha ceased. After the Berlin Wall came down, most of the firms were reestablished as private companies. As of 2009, there are still about 20 small glass-blowing firms active in Lauscha that produce baubles. One of the producers is Krebs Glas Lauscha, part of the Krebs family, which is now one of the largest producers of glass ornaments worldwide.

== Modern baubles ==
Although glass baubles are still produced, as expensive good-quality ornaments often found at markets, baubles are now frequently made from plastic and available worldwide in a massive variety of shapes, colours and designs. Since the 19th century, there are a large number of manufacturers producing sophisticated Christmas glass ornaments in Poland, which produce "bombka" or the plural form "bombki"; Poland is the largest producer of glass bombe (bauble) ornaments that are exported to many countries all over the world, mainly to the United States, Japan, Australia, Sweden, Norway, France, the UK, and millions of glass-blown Christmas ornaments are made year-round in Tlalpujahua, Michoacan, Mexico, and exported to Spain, New Zealand and France. They are also made in Chignahuapan, Puebla, Mexico.

== Handcrafted ==
Handcrafted Christmas ornaments have become a staple of craft fairs, and many smaller online businesses owe much of their success to both the internet and the growth of craft stores. Sugar cookies, popcorn balls, gingerbread and many types of cookies can be used as ornaments.

== Manufacture of handmade glass ornaments ==
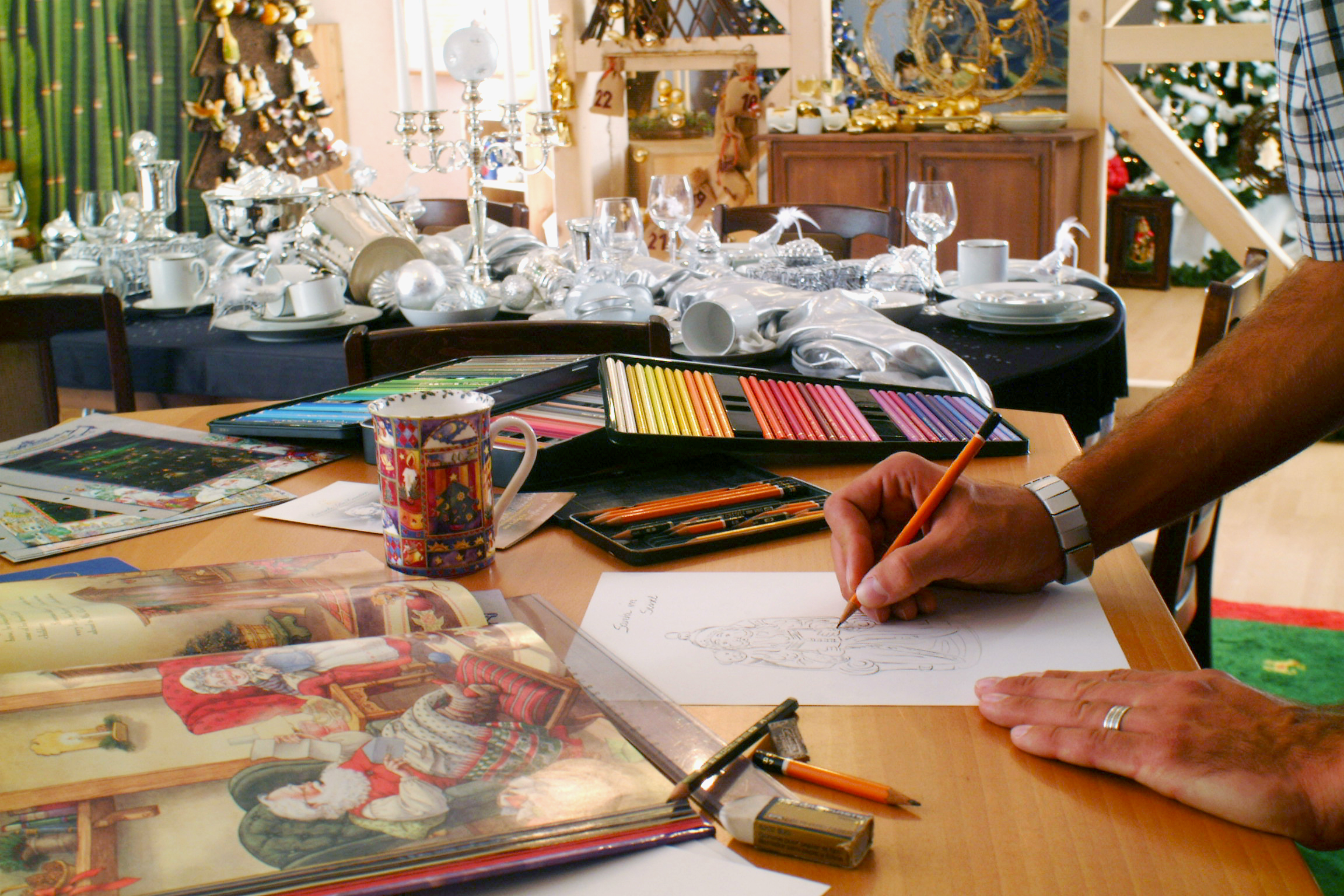
Design of a glass Christmas ornament

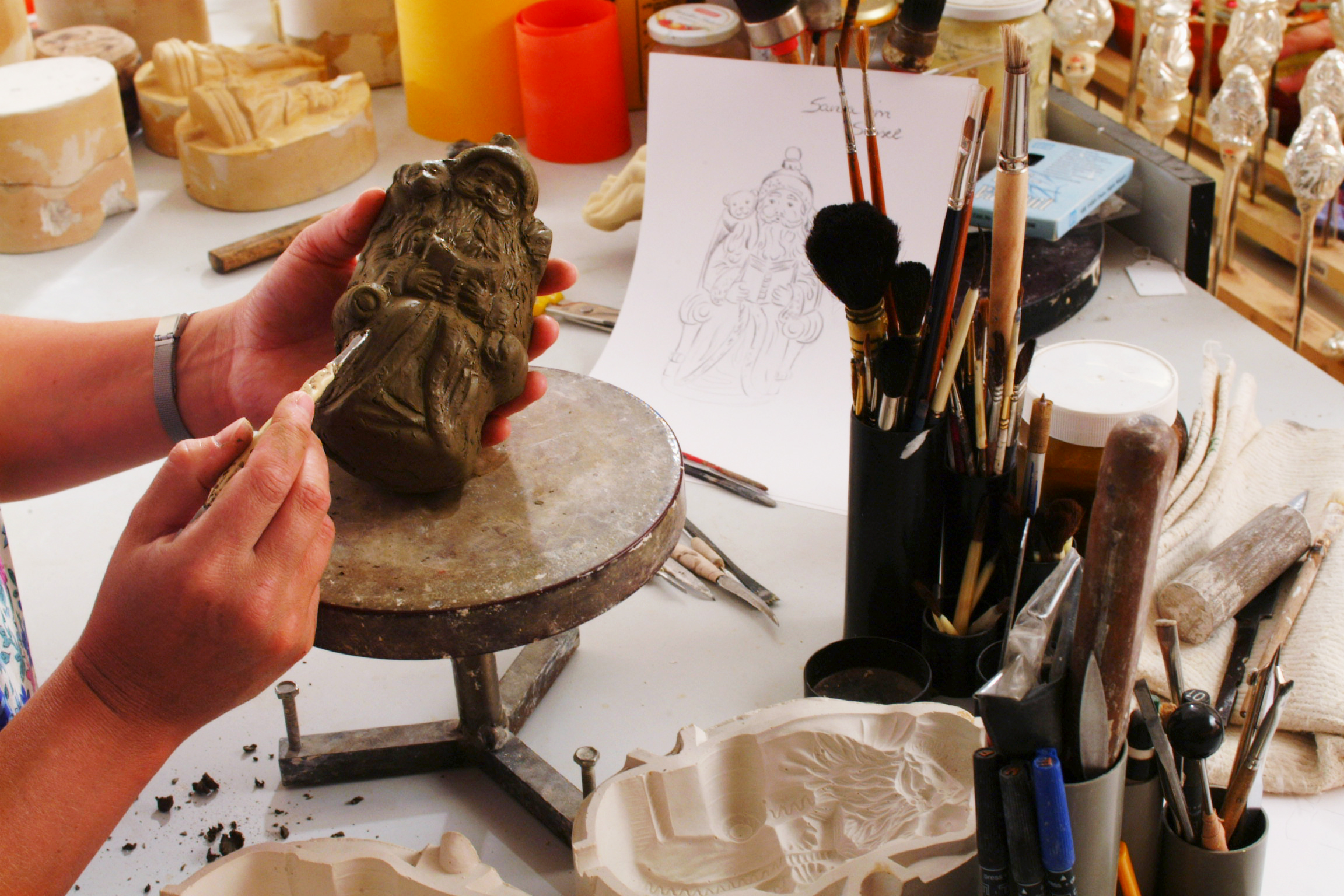
Sculpturing to produce a mould for a Christmas glass ornament

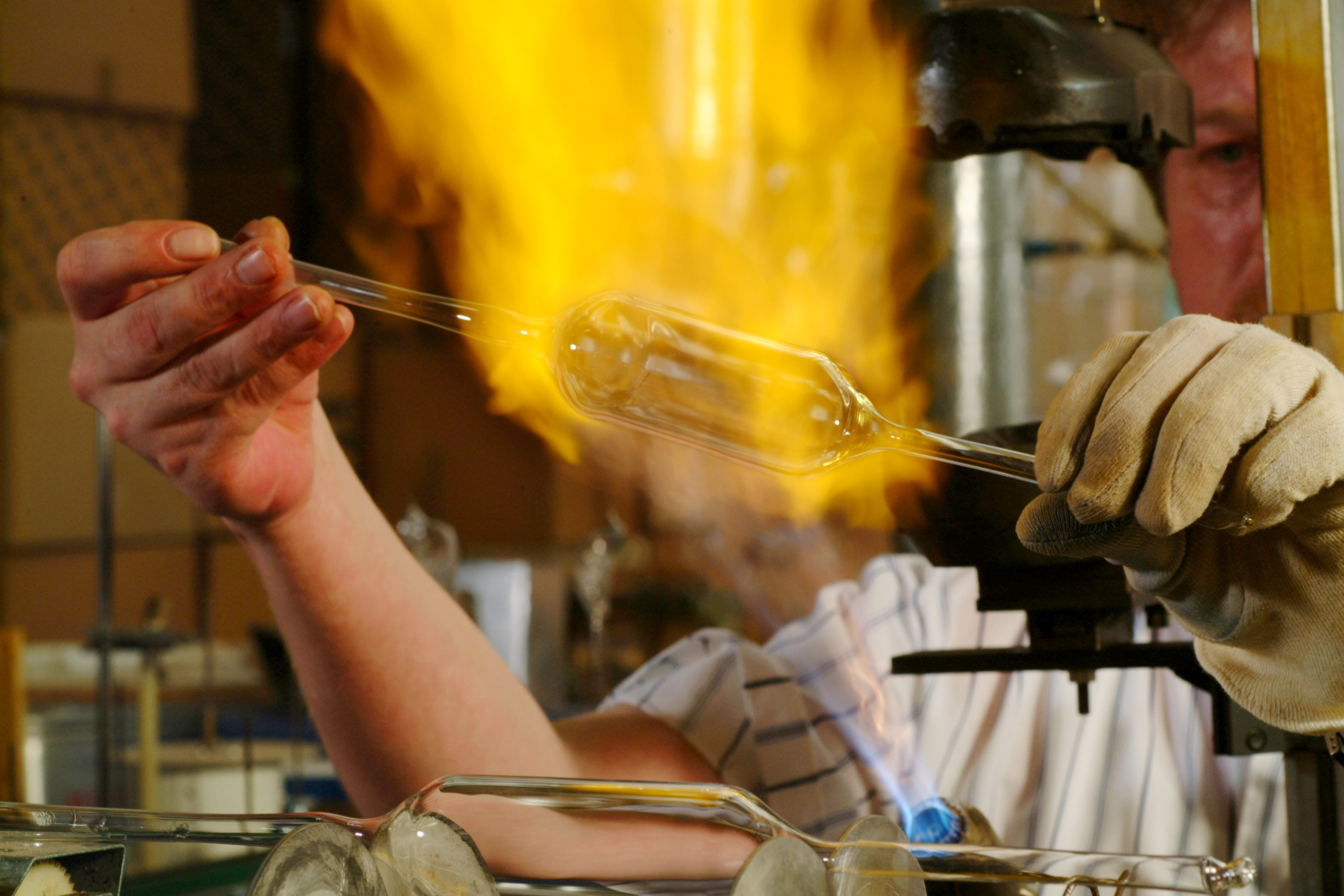
Blowing glass ornament fabrication

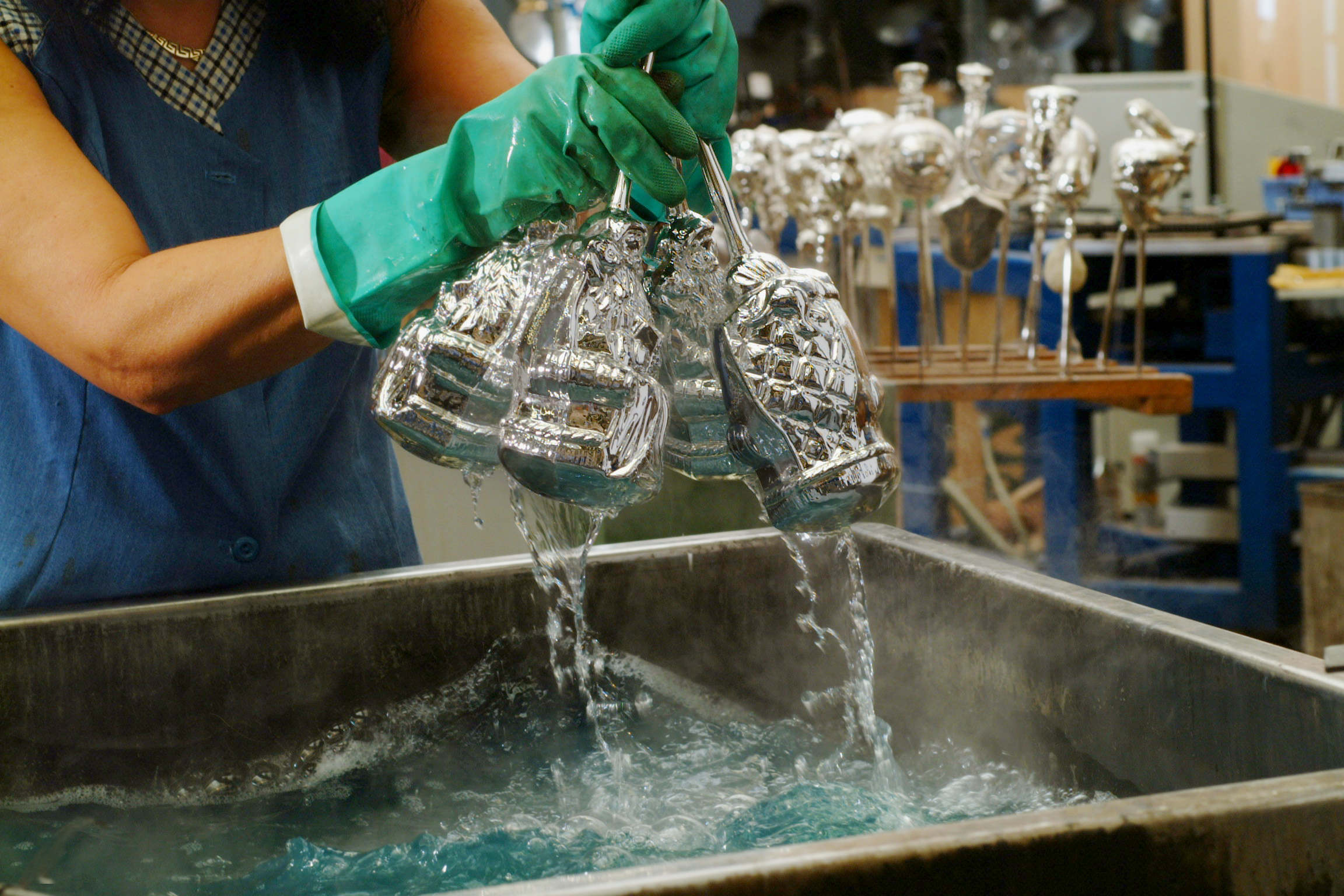
Silvering of glass ornaments

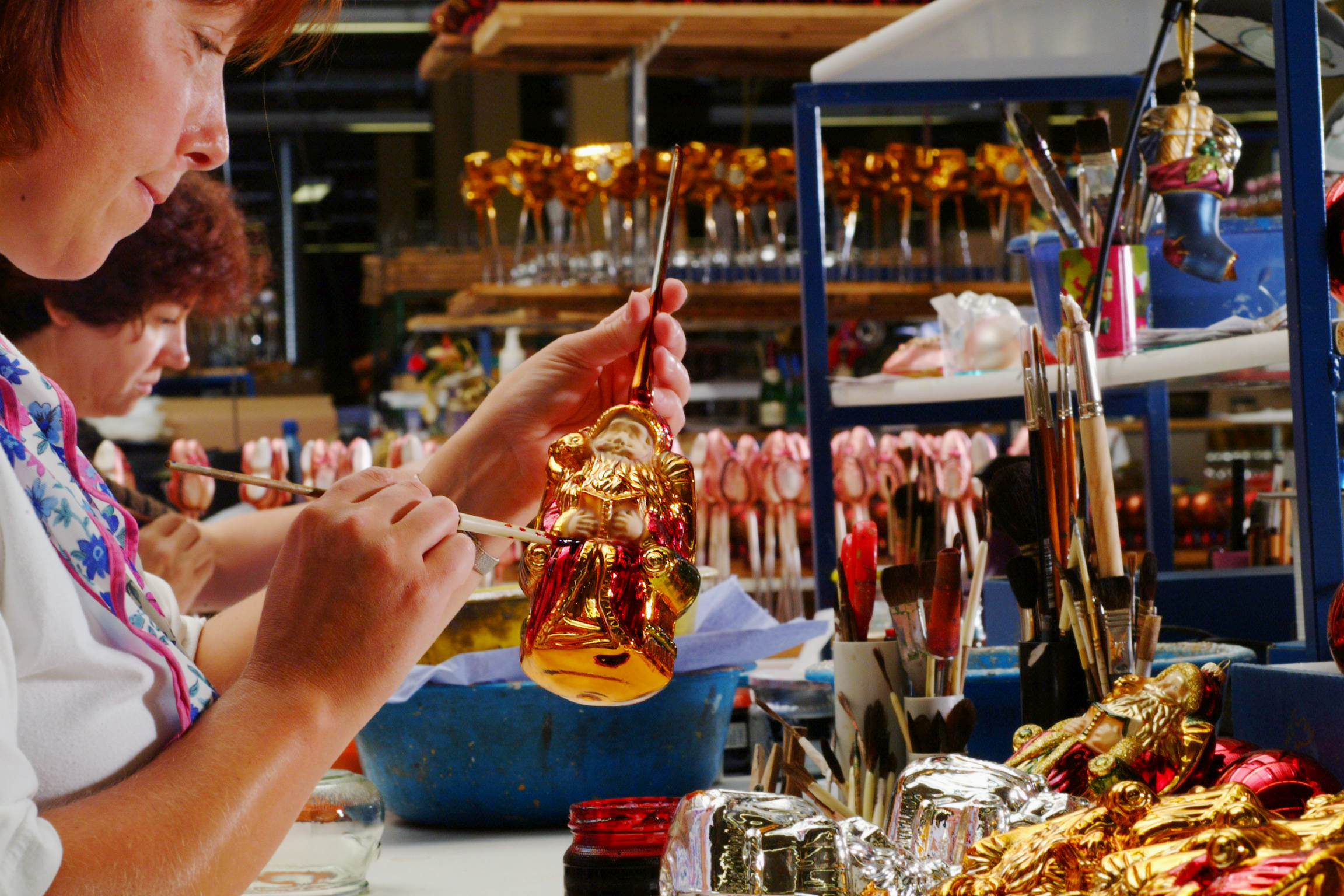
Painting of a glass Christmas ornament

== Types ==
Christmas tree ornaments

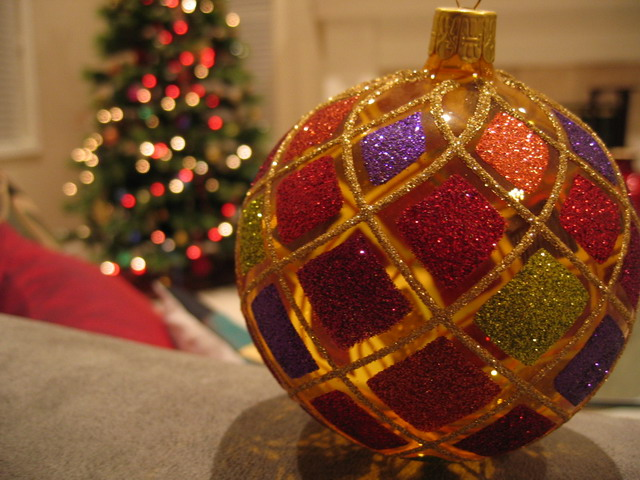
Bauble, or ball ornament

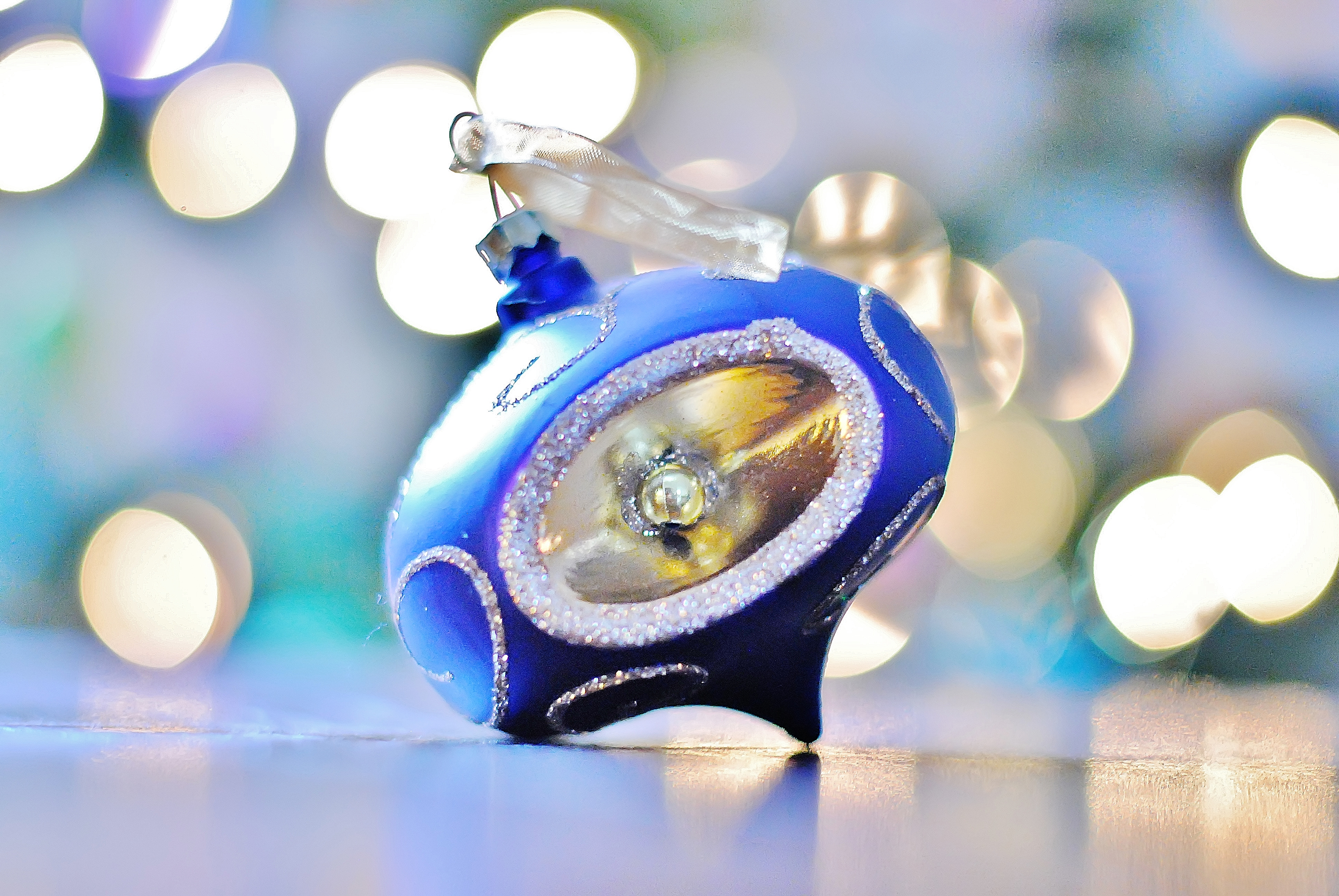
Blue glass ornament

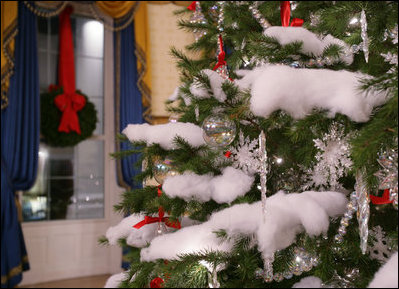
Imitation tree snow

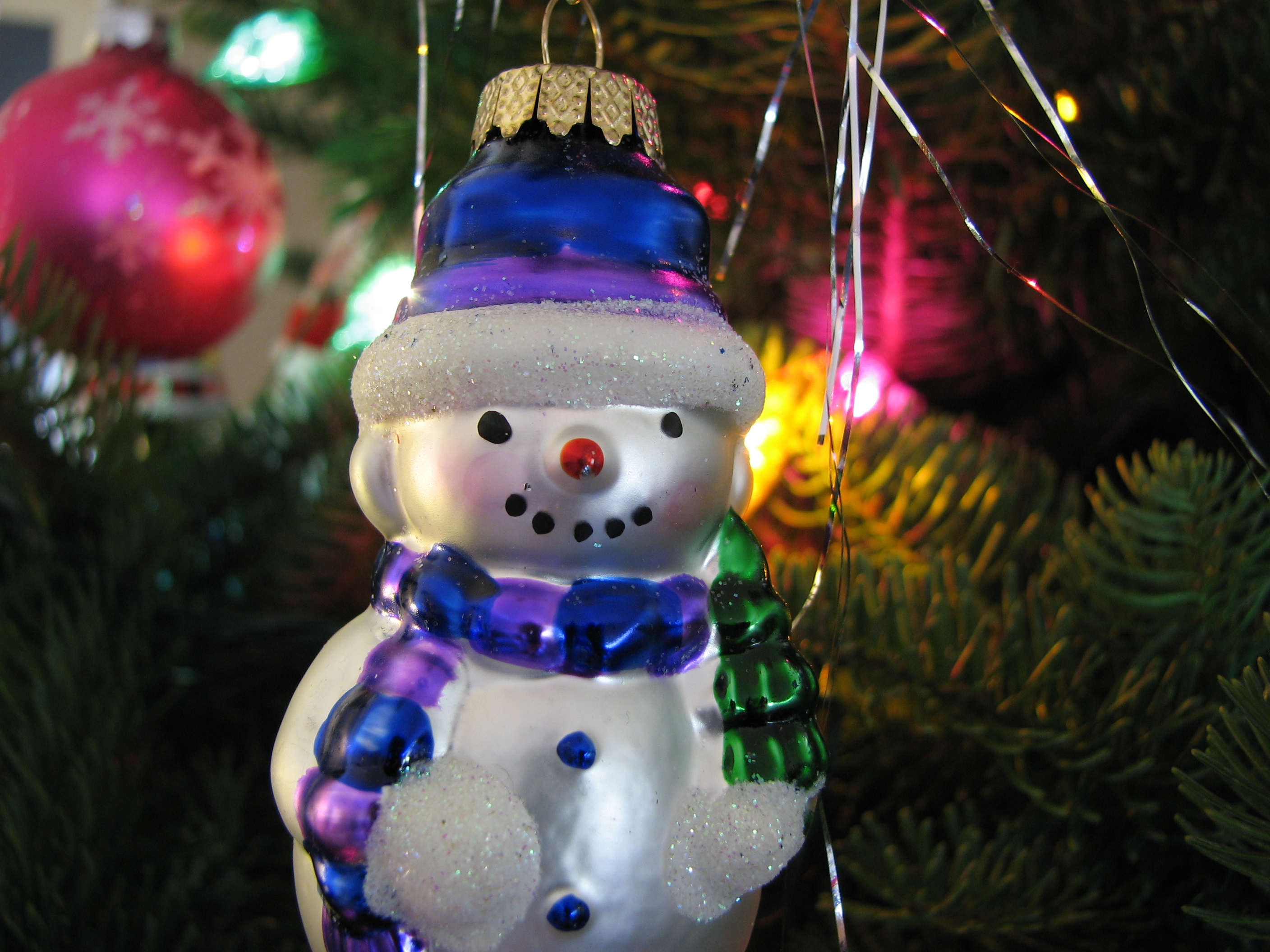
Glass snowman ornament

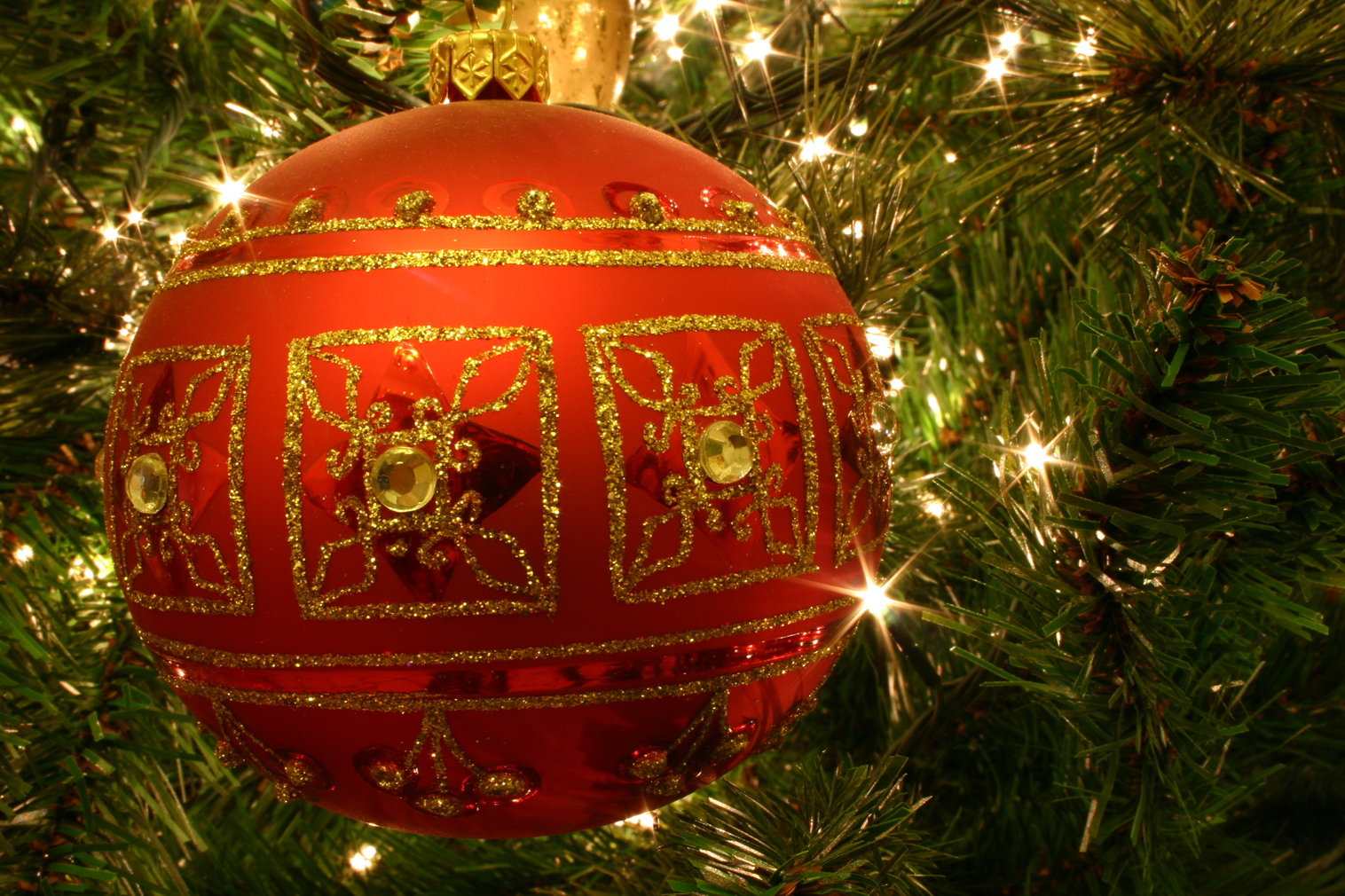
Red and gold ornamented bauble

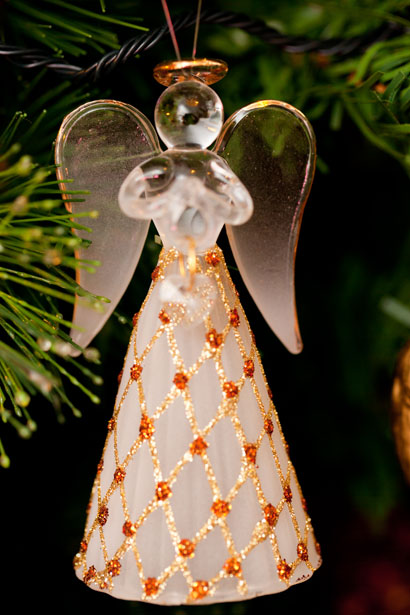
Angel decoration

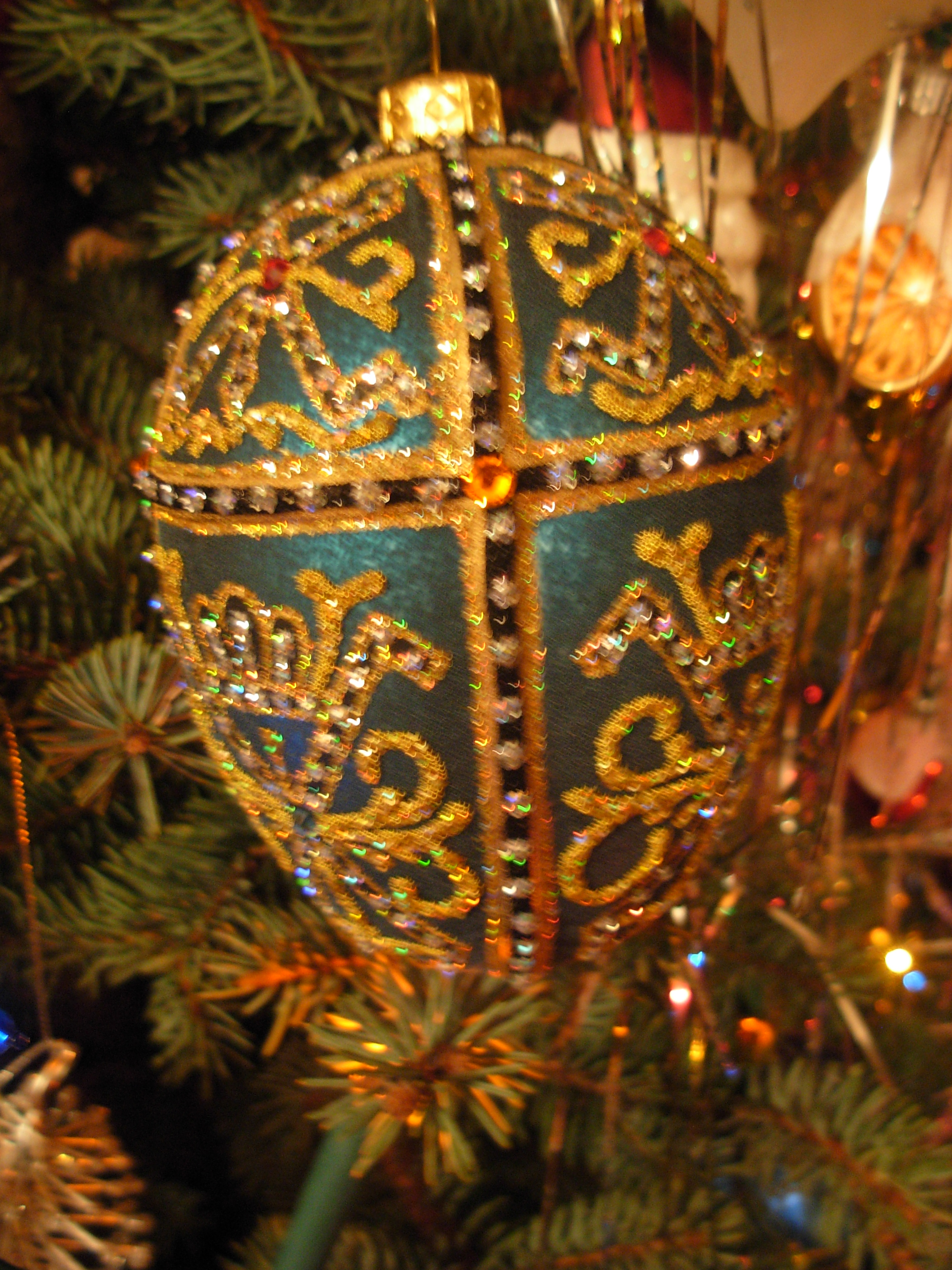
Glass Fabergé egg as a decoration.

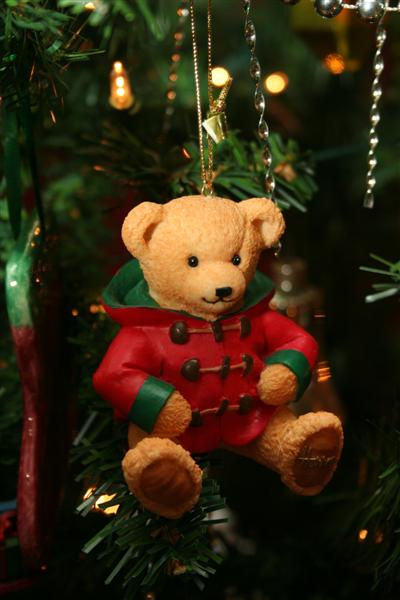
Bear ornament

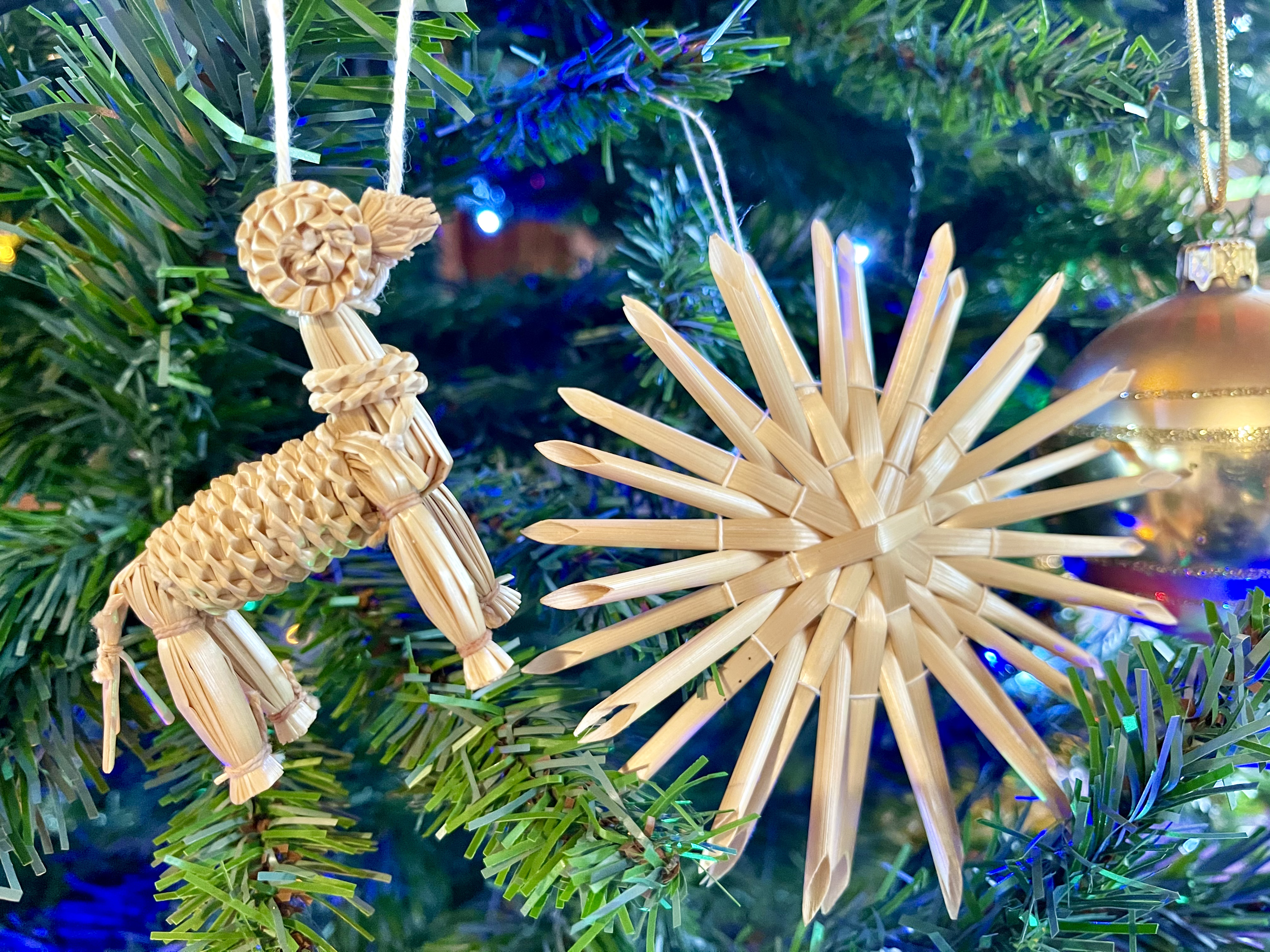
Polish folk Straw ornaments

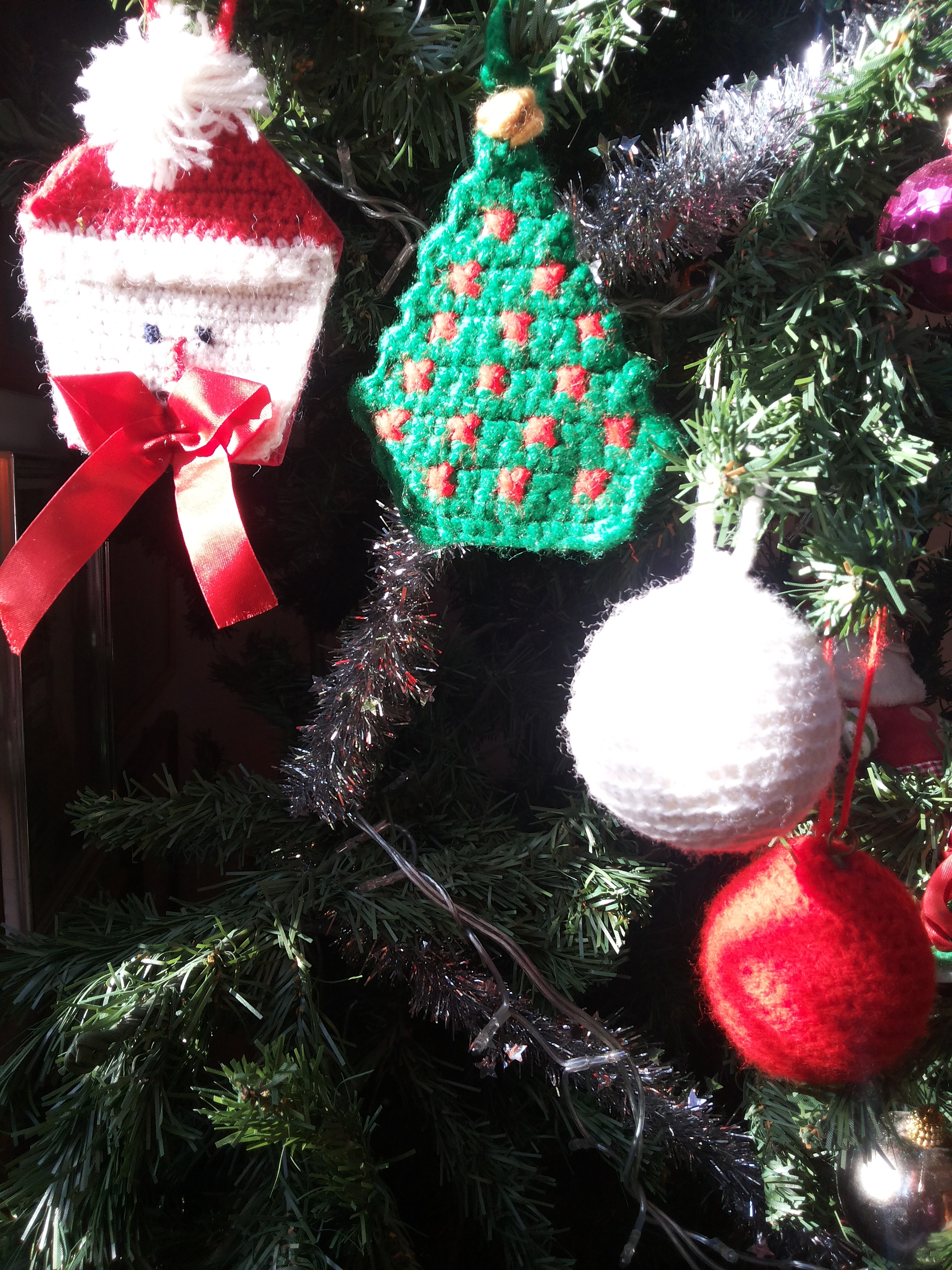
Crochet ornaments

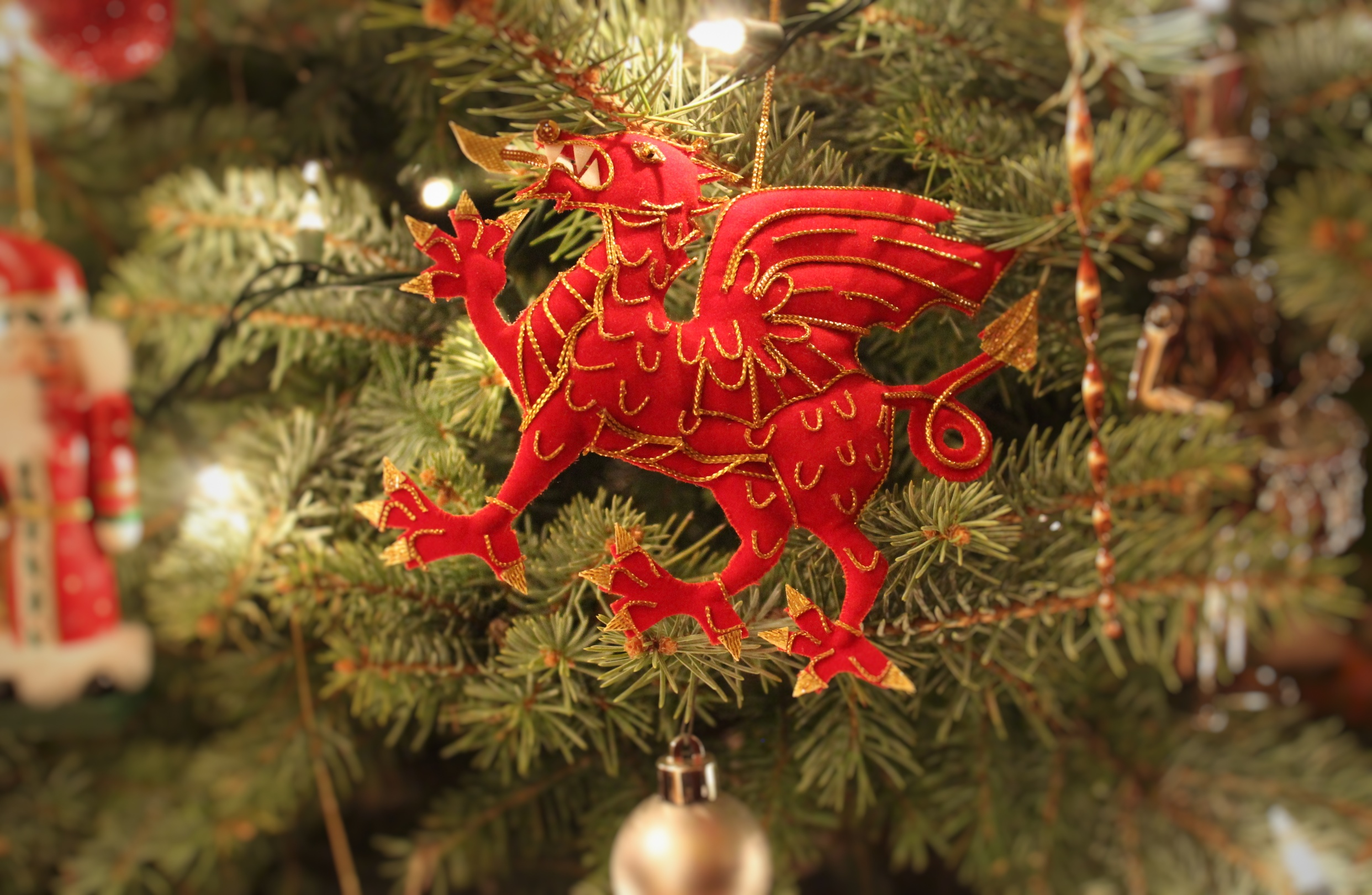
Cloth ornament

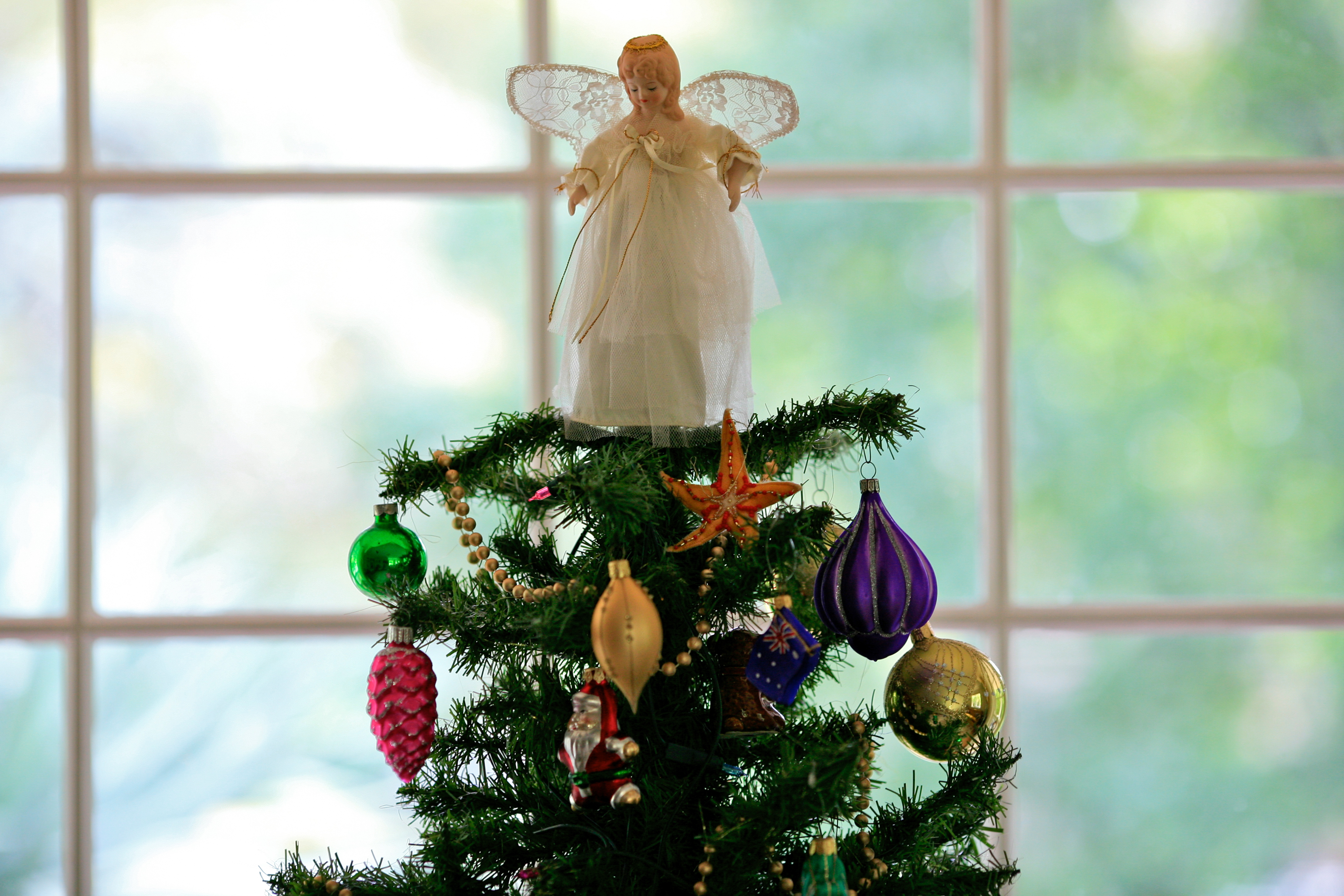
Angel as tree top decoration

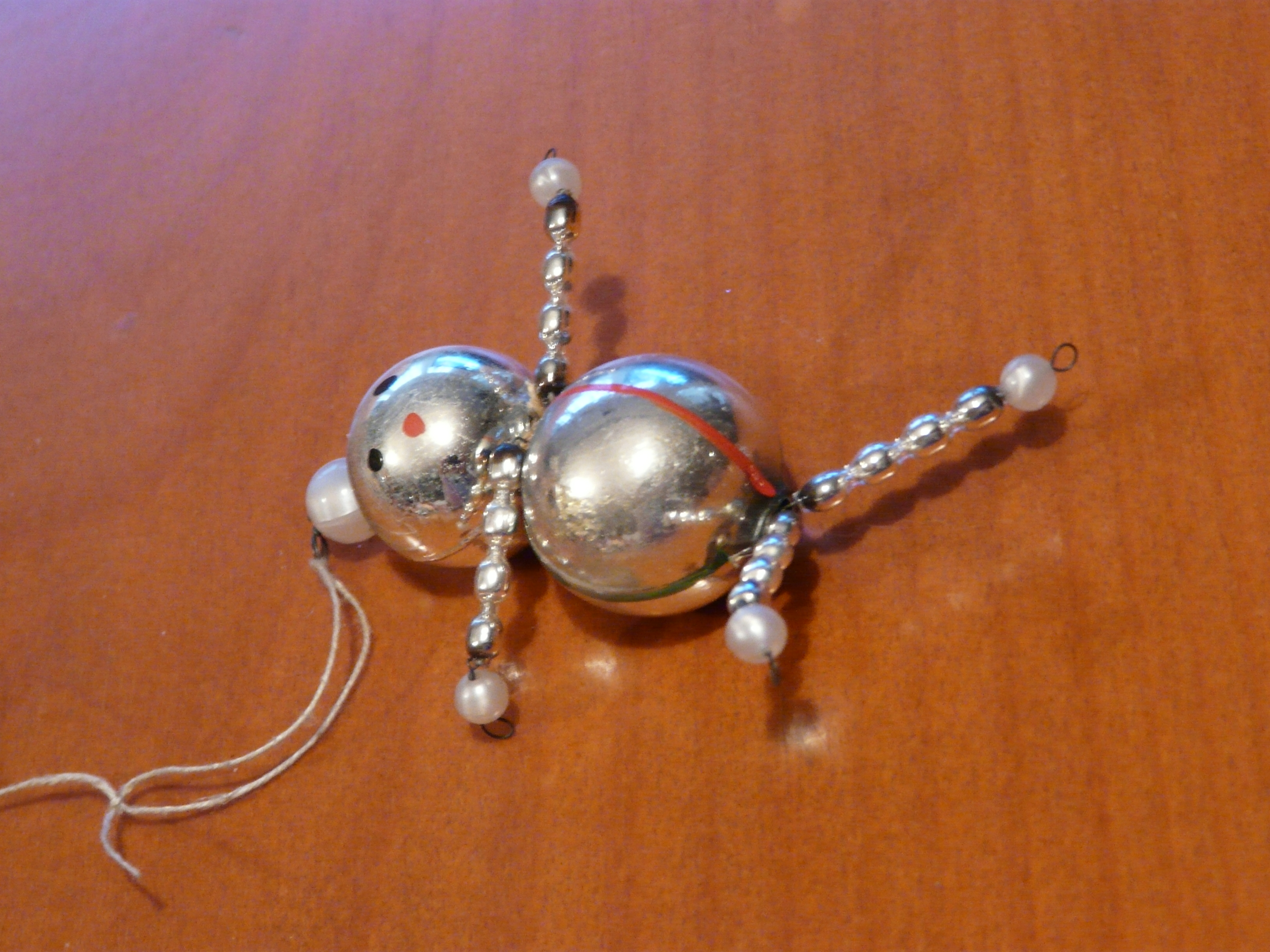
Pre-1939 Polish snowman ornament

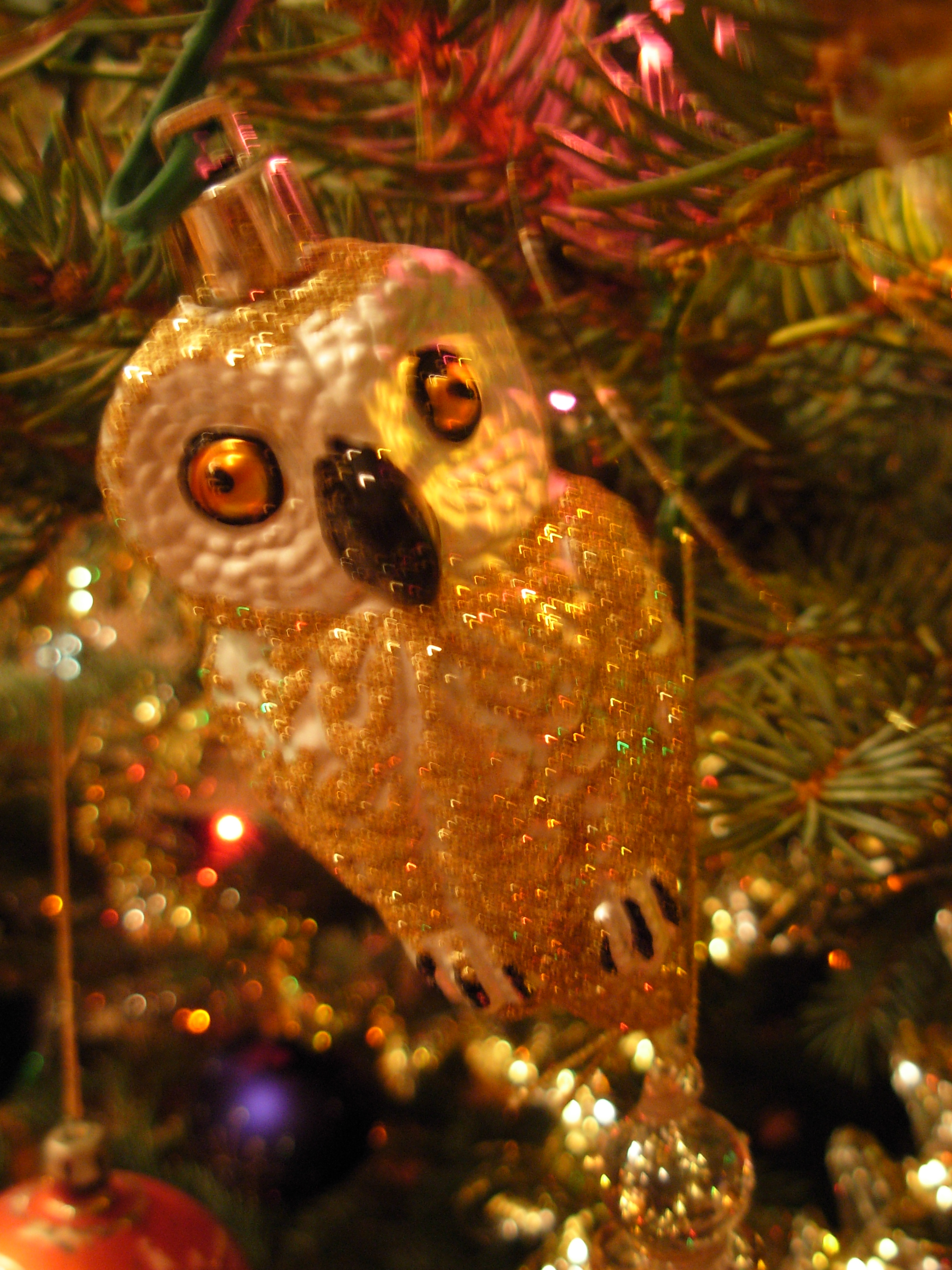
Glass owl ornament

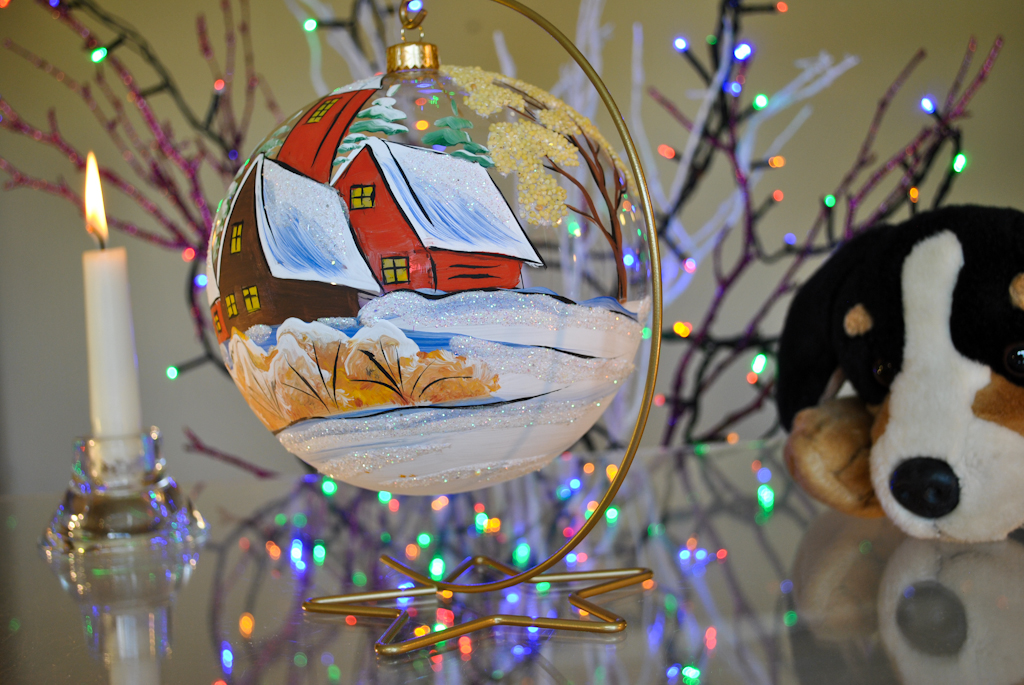
Hand-painted glass bauble

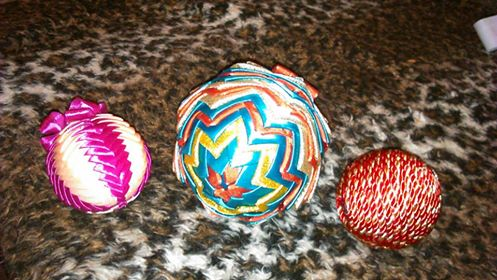
Polish bombki baubles made with ribbons

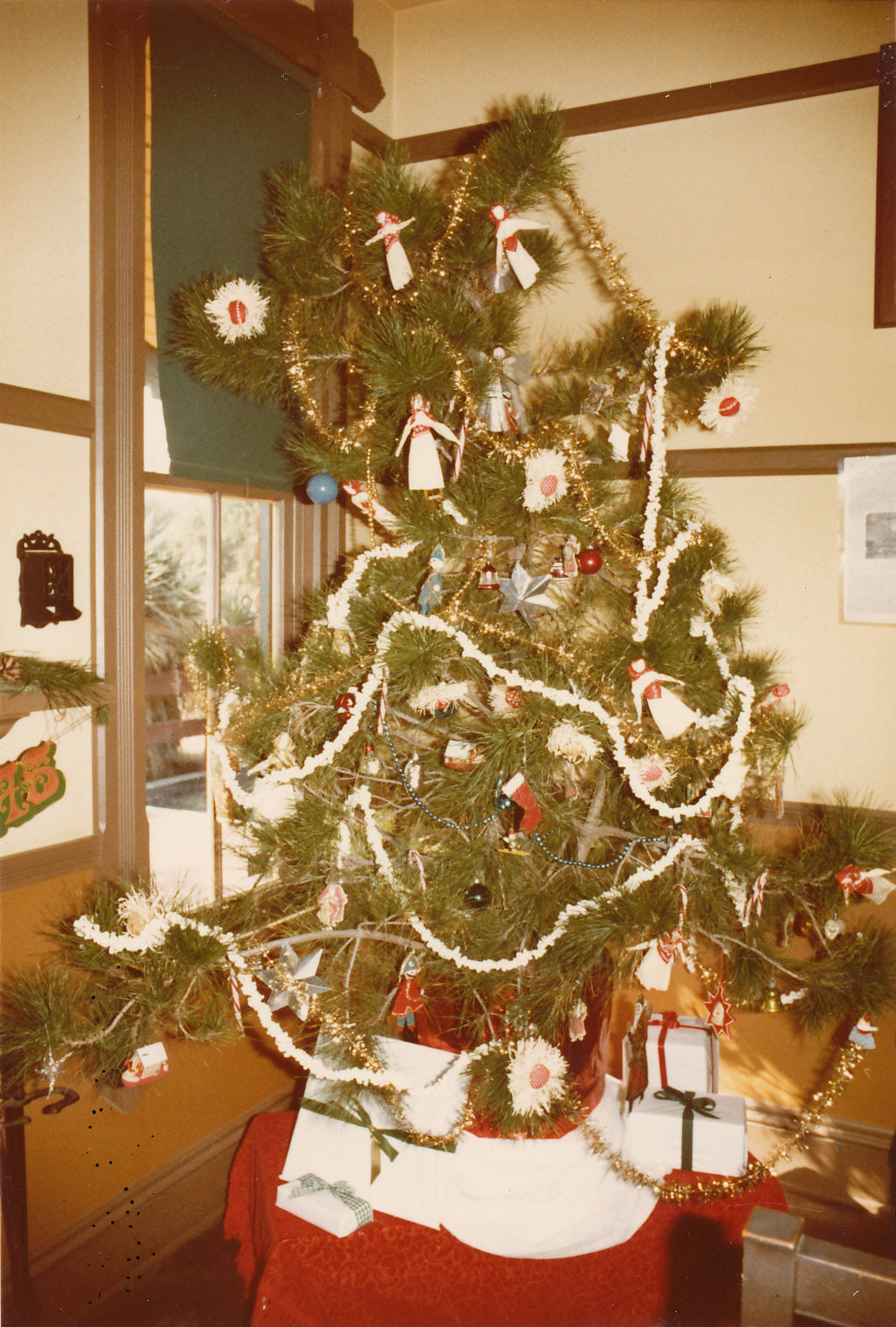
Popcorn garland on Christmas tree

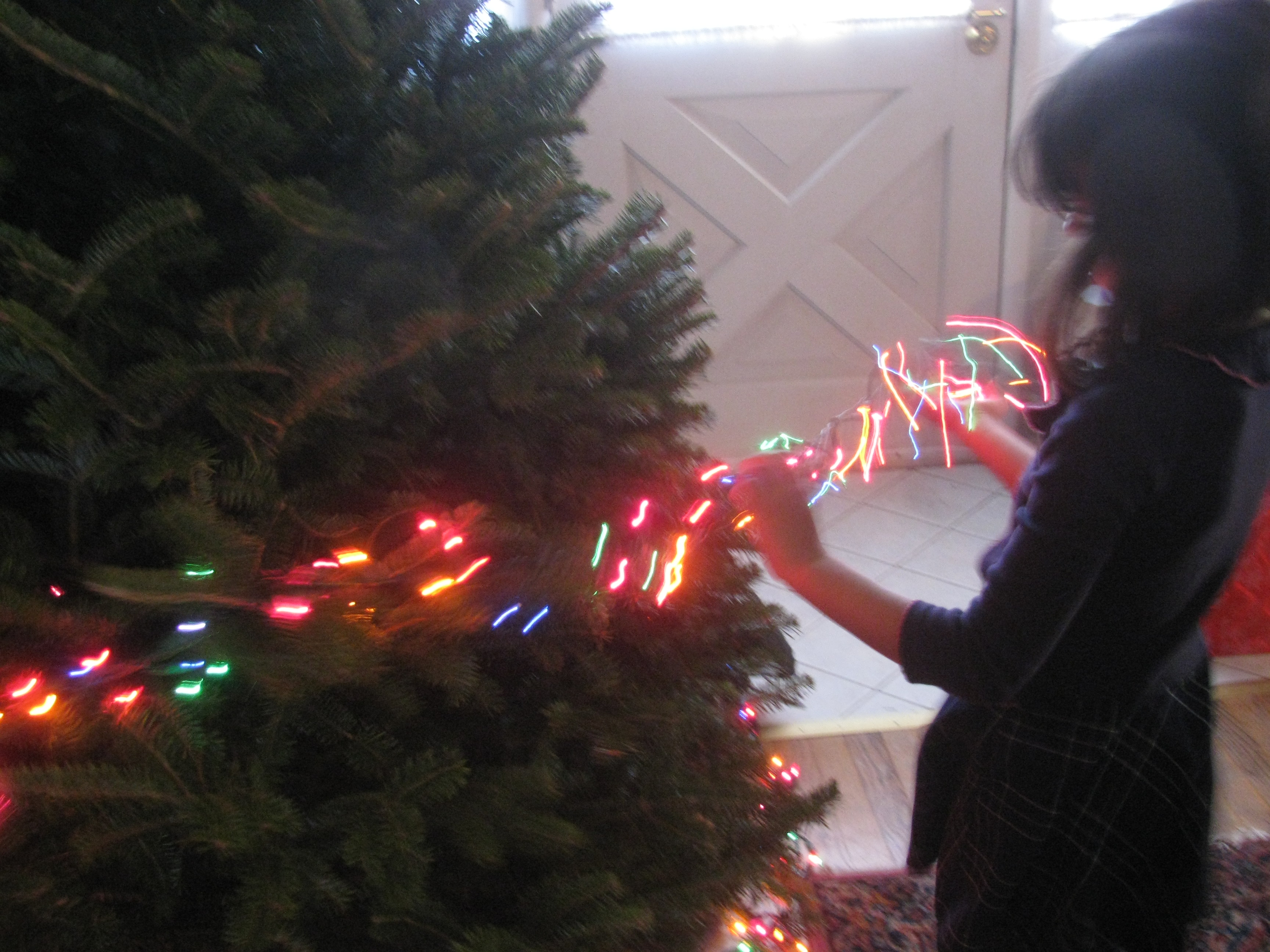
Stringing lights on Christmas tree

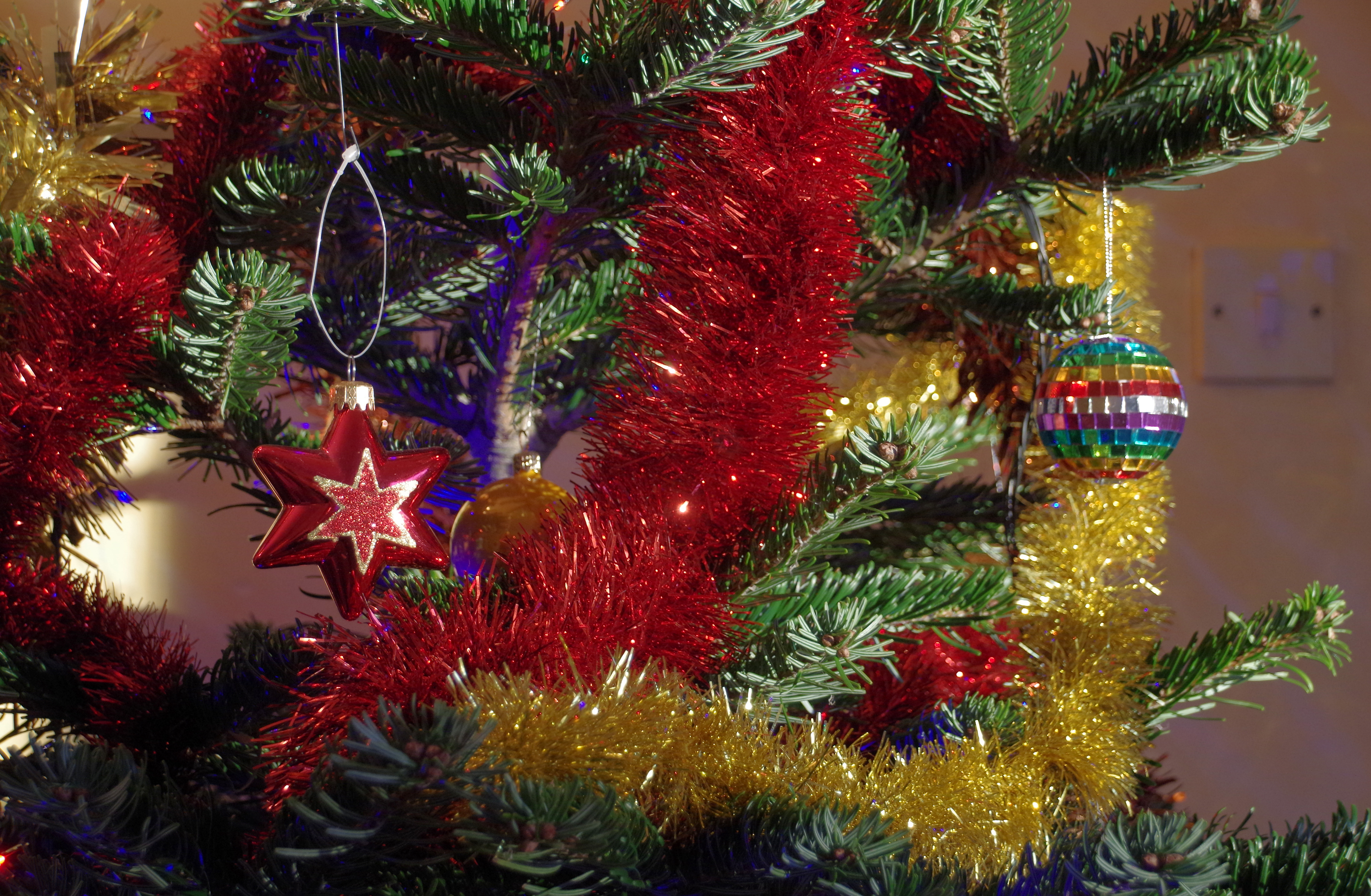
Christmas tree with tinsel garland.

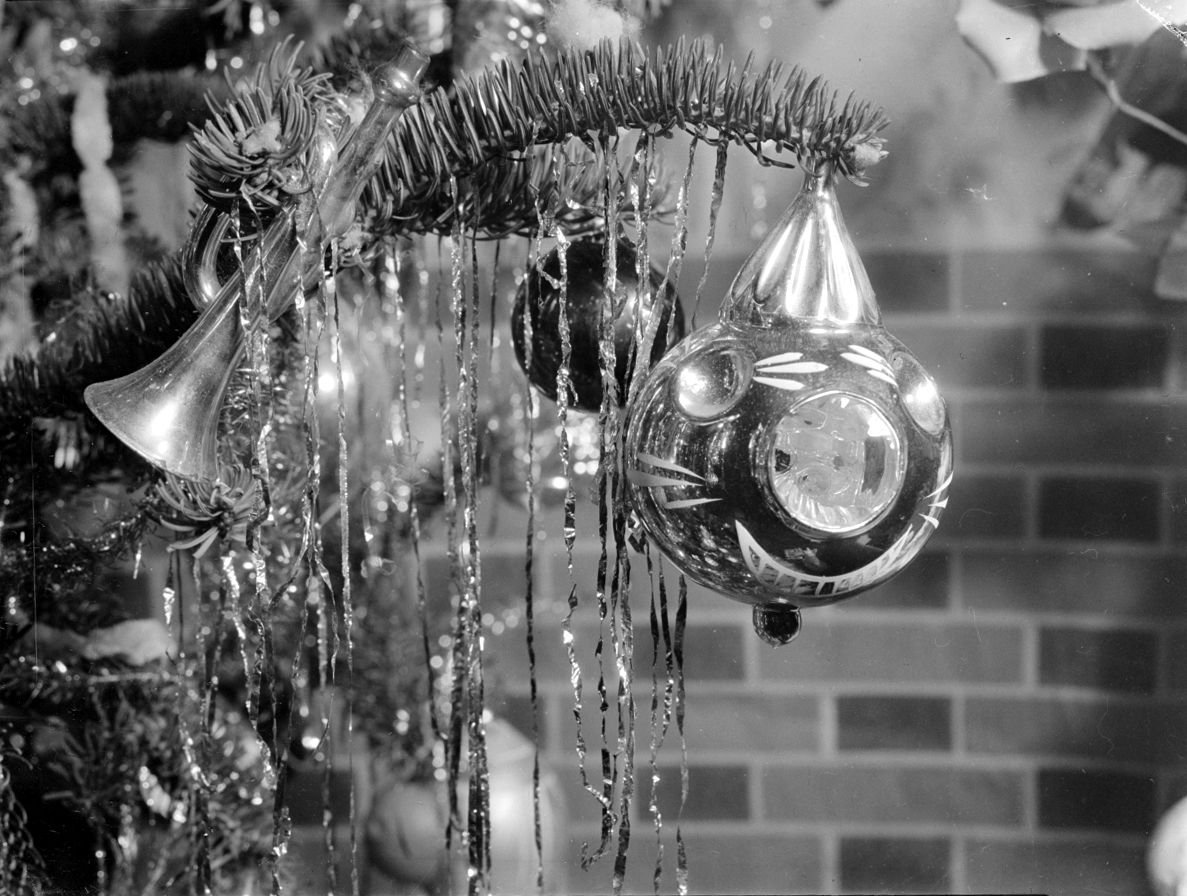
Christmas tree with tinsel lametta (long narrow strips)

== See also ==
- Christmas tree
- Pleated Christmas hearts
- Snow baby
- Tree-topper
- Witch ball
