= Pleated Christmas hearts =

Danish craft ornament

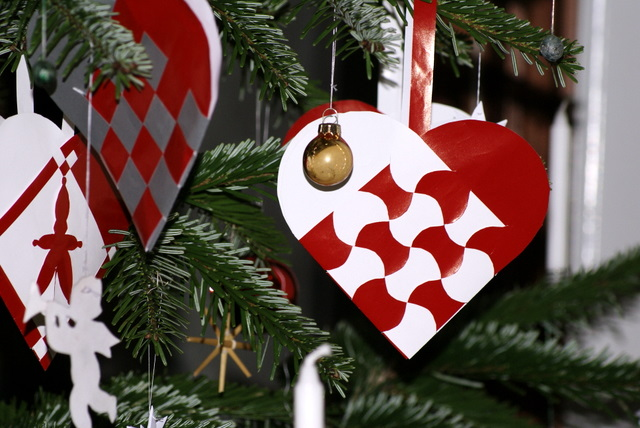
Various pleated Christmas hearts

Pleated Christmas hearts (Danish: Julehjerte) are Danish, Norwegian, and north German crafts, commonly used as Christmas ornaments.

== History ==
The exact age and origin of the tradition of making paper hearts is unknown, but the oldest known pleated Christmas hearts were made by the Danish author Hans Christian Andersen in 1860. However, as Andersen's heart has no handle, it seems unlikely it could have been used as a Christmas tree ornament. Andersen's pleated heart is today located in the Hans Christian Andersen Museum in the city of Odense in Denmark. It is documented, however, that Andersen did make decorations for Christmas trees, and that the predecessors of the pleated Christmas hearts were miniature wicker baskets.

The oldest known guide to making pleated Christmas hearts is found in an 1871 edition of the Danish journal Nordisk Husflidstidende. The oldest pleated Christmas heart (from 1873) is preserved at the National Museum of Norway, in Oslo. But it was still some 40 years before the pleated Christmas hearts became more widespread.

The oldest depiction of a Christmas tree decorated with pleated hearts dates from 1901 from the Danish manor house Søllestedgaard. That same year, the pleated heart motif was used by Swedish artist Carl Larsson in the lithograph Brita as Idun.

It is believed that Danish kindergartens from around 1910 started spreading the use of the pleated Christmas hearts, which were made from glossy paper in order to enhance the children's creative abilities, patience, and fine motor skills.

== Pleated books ==
- The first pleated Christmas book, Julehjerter (1975), was released by the Lottrup Knudsen brothers.
- A more recent book (2002) which includes a big variety of pleated Christmas heart templates, is Francis Jordt's Flettede julehjerter(https://bibliotek.kk.dk/ting/object/870970-basis%3A24272486)
