= Clara Johnson Scroggins =

American Christmas ornaments expert

- Born: January 1, 1931; Arkansas, United States
- Died: December 19, 2019 (aged 88); Florida, United States
- Occupations: Author; collector; fashion model; broadcast journalist
- Spouse(s): Edwin Redfern (m. 1969; d. 1972) Joe Scroggins, Jr. (m. 1974; died 2008)

Clara Johnson Scroggins was a collector and author on the subject of Christmas ornaments, and was considered an expert in the field as well.

== Biography ==
Scroggins started collecting ornaments in 1972 following the unexpected and sudden death of her then-husband from a cerebral hemorrhage a few weeks before Christmas. She recounted that she "needed something to really consume me, to help me." In a jewelry store she purchased a second edition Reed and Barton silver Christmas cross and started researching how to obtain a first edition one. By the following year, Scroggins's had collected nearly 1,000 silver and silverplated ornaments from past years and editions. Through meetings with secondary market dealers and other collectors, she learned about ornament values and eventually documented ornament history.

Scroggins's collection grew to 40,000 Christmas ornaments, from manufacturers such as Hallmark Cards, American Greetings, Bacarrat, Cartier, Enesco, Gucci, Lenox, Orrefors, Pfaltzgraff, Precious Moments, Rosenthal, Royal Doulton, Tiffany, Waterford, Wedgwood and materials including German keugel or blown-glass, porcelain, pewter, tin, paper, and crystal. Many ornaments in the collection are from Europe, particularly Germany. By 1994, Scroggins's ornament collection numbered 250,000 pieces.

Scroggins was the author of a number of books about Christmas ornament collecting, values and history. She focused her writing on ornaments from Hallmark Cards because they were the most popular at the time.

In 1973, Hallmark Cards started manufacturing Christmas ornaments. The first collection of 18 ornaments, including six glass ball ornaments. Hallmark Keepsake Ornaments are dated and available for just one year. In 1996, the ornament industry generated $2.4 billion in total annual sales, an increase of 25% over the previous year. Industry experts estimated more than 22 million US households collected Christmas ornaments, and that 75% of those households collected Hallmark Keepsake Ornaments. By 1998, 11 million American households collected Hallmark ornaments, and 250,000 people were members of the Keepsake Ornament Collector's Club. There were as many as 400 local Keepsake Ornament Collector's Club chapters in the US.

Scroggins was instrumental in influencing Hallmark Cards to introduce African American-themed ornaments, including its first Black Christmas ornament, "Cheerful Santa" in 1992. She also wrote an ornament column for Collector's Mart - The Magazine of Art Collectibles.

== Publications ==
Books by Clara Johnson Scroggins
Title	Published	Publisher	OCLC	Notes
Hallmark Keepsake Ornaments: A Collector's Guide, 1994-1998	1998	Meredith Integrated Marketing, Des Moines, IA	OCLC 40227648	25th Anniversary of Hallmark Keepsake Ornaments, 192 pages.
Silver Christmas Ornaments: A Collector' Guide	1980	A.S. Barnes, San Diego, CA	OCLC 5029287	24 silver collections highlighted, including Reed and Barton, The Franklin Mint, Lunt Silversmiths, and The Smithsonian Collection made by Stieff, 197 pages.
Collector's Value Guide Hallmark Keepsake Ornaments: Secondary Market Price Guide & Collector Handbook	1999	CheckerBee Pub, Middletown, CT	OCLC 797142383	Jeff Mahony, Managing Editor, foreword by Scroggins. 367 pages.
Hallmark Keepsake Ornaments: A Collector's Guide : 1973-1993 the First Twenty Years	1998	Hallmark Cards, Inc., Kansas City, MO	OCLC 40554873	20th Anniversary of Hallmark Keepsake Ornaments, 480 pages.
Hallmark Keepsake Ornaments: A Collector's Guide	1991	Hallmark Cards, Inc., Kansas City, MO	OCLC 24465598	Features Hallmark ornaments from 1973 to 1991, 361 pages.
Hallmark Keepsake Ornaments: Also Featuring Merry Miniatures, Kiddie Car Classics	1998	Collectors' Pub. Co., Meriden, CT	OCLC 973163769	Jeff Mahony, Managing Editor, foreword by Scroggins. 349 pages.
Hallmark Keepsake Ornaments: A Collector's Guide. 4th Edition	1989	Hallmark Cards, Inc., Kansas City, MO	OCLC 29478341	281 pages.
Hallmark Keepsake Ornaments: A Collector's Guide. 2nd Edition	1985	Wallace-Homestead Book Co., Des Moines, Iowa	OCLC 990756251	Featuring ornaments from 1973 to 1985, 158 pages.
Hallmark Keepsake Ornaments: A Collector's Guide. 3rd Edition	1987	Hallmark Cards, Inc., Kansas City, MO	OCLC 17341277	207 pages.

== External References ==
Clara Johnson Scroggins in libraries (WorldCat catalog)
