= Christmas decoration =

Decorations used during the Christmas period

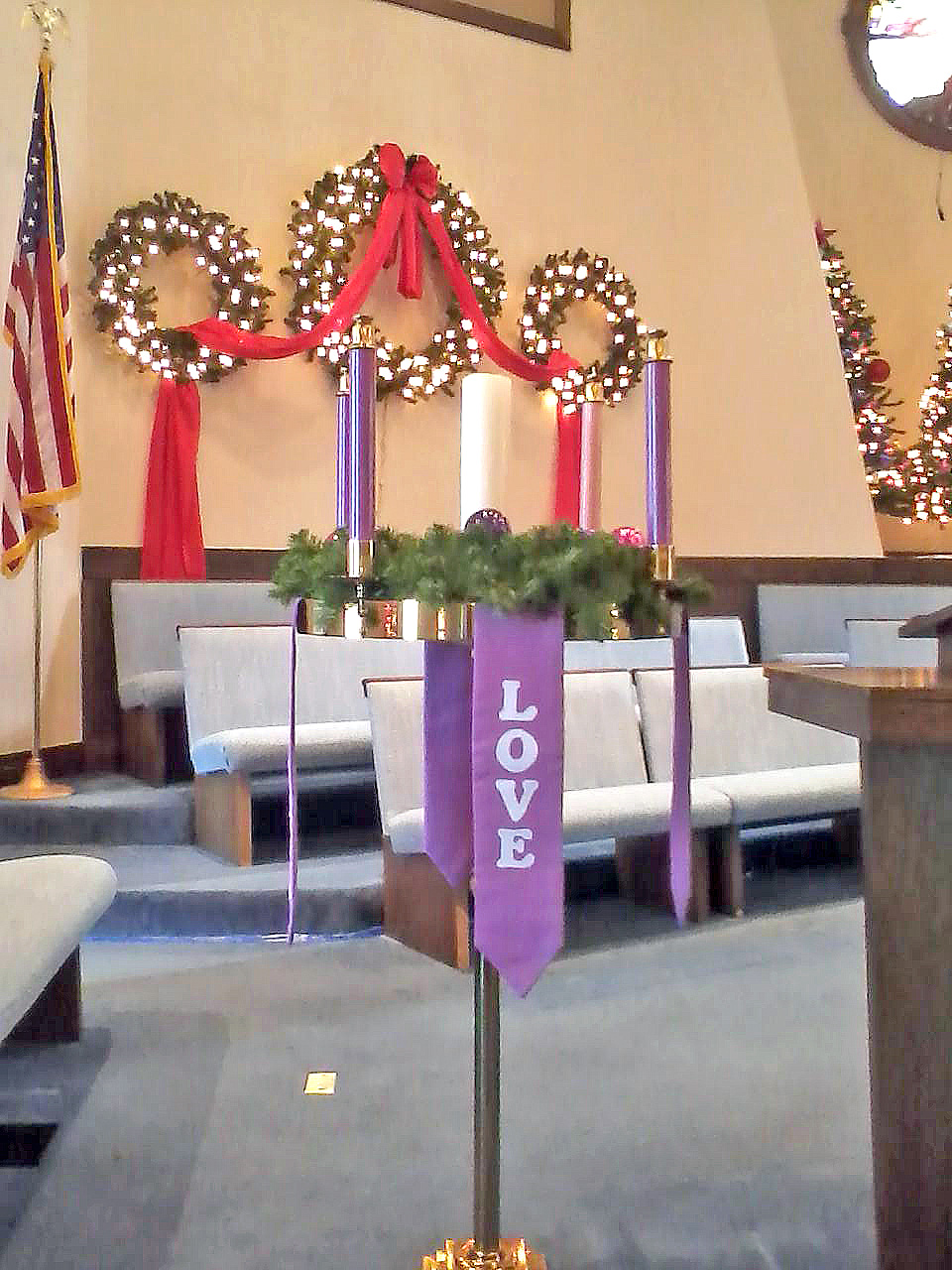
On Christmas Day, the Christ Candle in the center of the Advent wreath is traditionally lit in many church services and Christmas dinners.

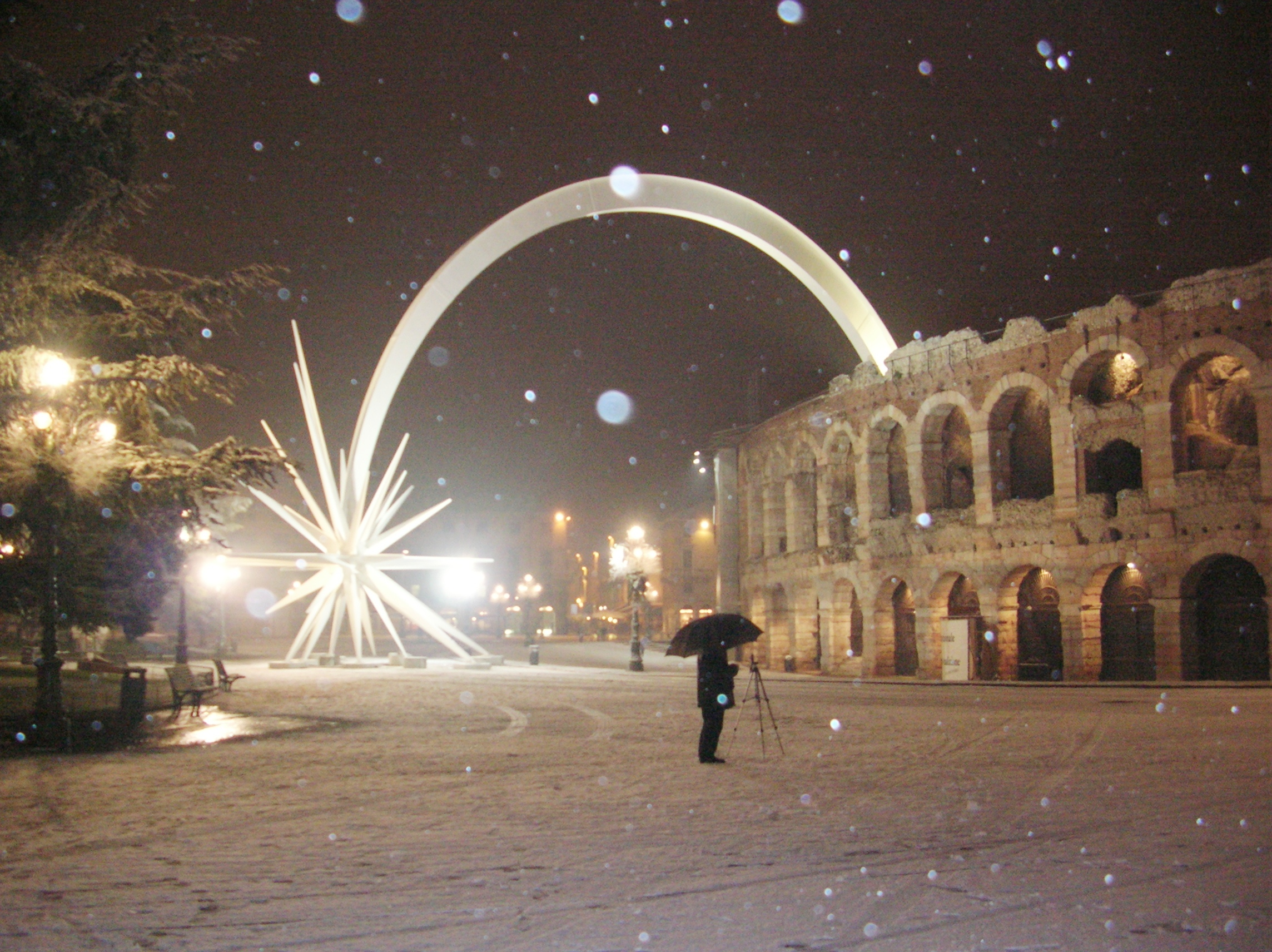
Christmas lights in Verona, Italy

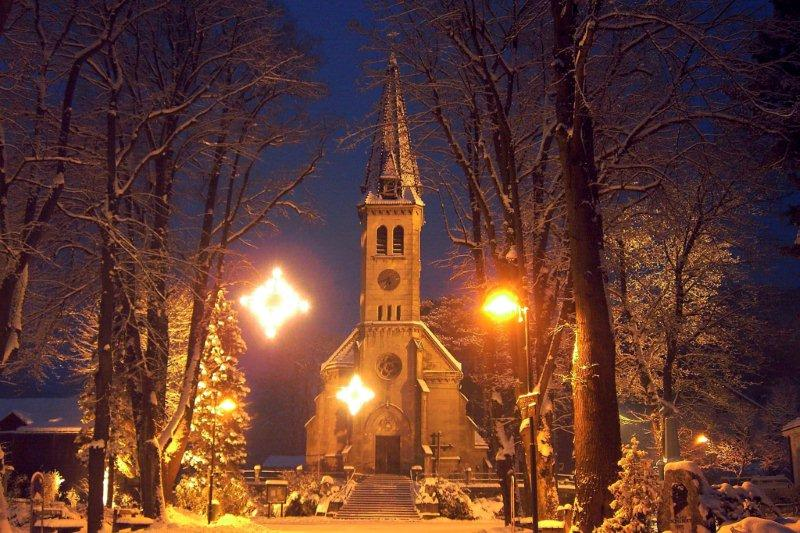
Christmas decoration in front of The church in Weissenbach an der Triesting

An animated Christmas angel from the late 20th century

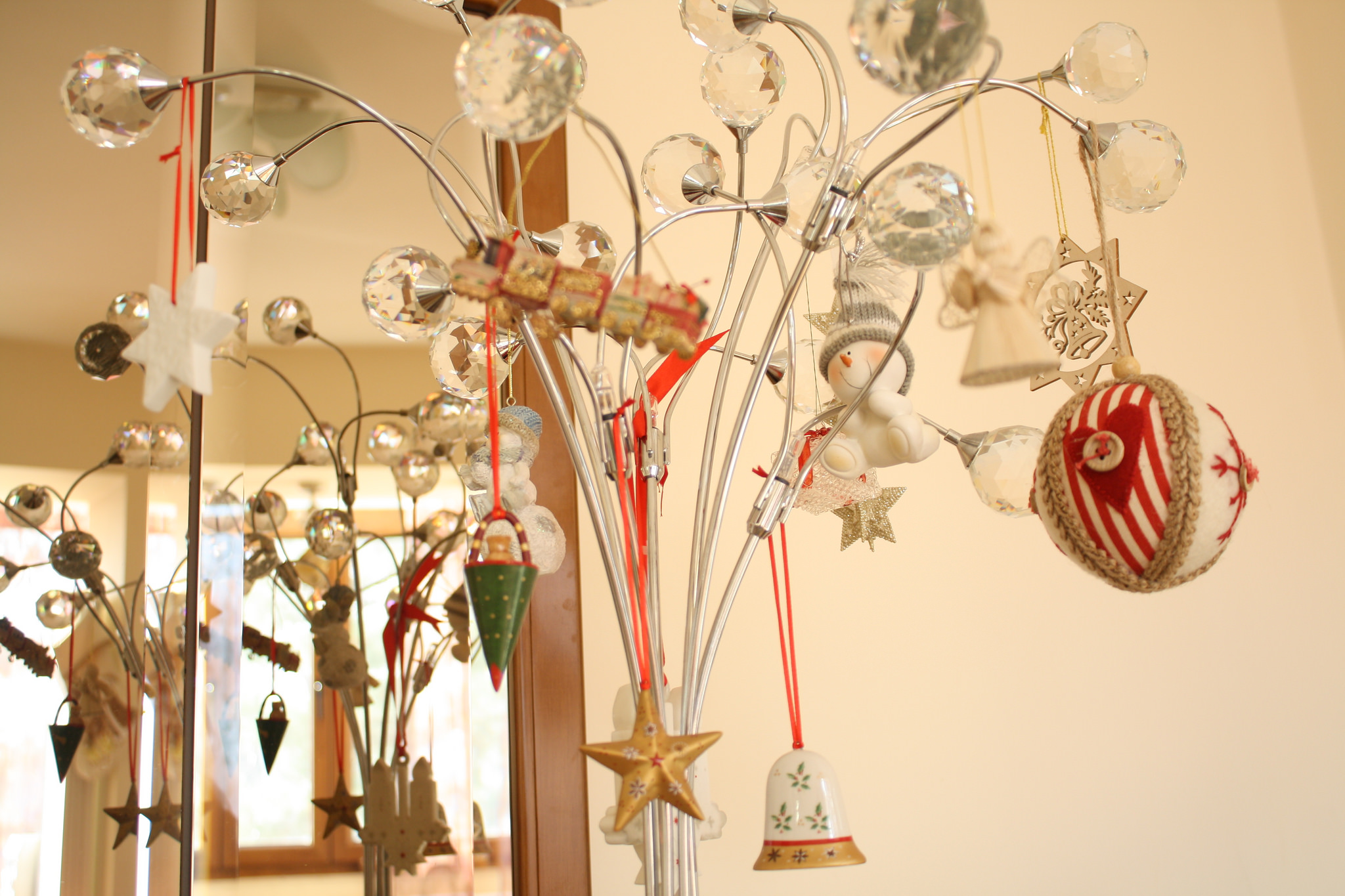
Christmas decorations in a private home, Europe

A Christmas decoration is any of several types of ornamentation used at Christmas and the greater Christmas and holiday season. Typical images on Christmas decorations include Baby Jesus, Mother Mary, angels, Father Christmas, Santa Claus, and the star of Bethlehem. Advent wreaths, nativity scenes, illuminations, and Moravian stars are popular Christmas decorations.

In many countries, such as Sweden, people start to set up their Advent and Christmas decorations on the first day of Advent. Liturgically, this is done in some parishes through a Hanging of the Greens ceremony. In the Western Christian world, the two traditional days when Christmas decorations are removed are Twelfth Night and if they are not taken down on that day, Candlemas, the latter of which ends the Christmas-Epiphany season in some denominations. Taking down Christmas decorations before Twelfth Night, as well as leaving the decorations up beyond Candlemas, is historically considered to be inauspicious.

The traditional colors of Christmas decorations are red, green, and gold. Red symbolizes the blood of Jesus, which was shed in his crucifixion; green symbolizes eternal life, and in particular the evergreen tree, which does not lose its leaves in the winter; and gold is the first color associated with Christmas, as one of the three gifts of the Magi, symbolizing royalty.

== History ==
In the 2nd century, the "earliest church records" indicate that "Christians were remembering and celebrating the birth of the Lord", an "observance [that] sprang up organically from the authentic devotion of ordinary believers"; although "they did not agree upon a set date".

Christmas decorations have been used as part of the festive nature of the holiday (Christmas) and season (Christmastide) celebrating the Nativity of Jesus. These include angels, bells, candy canes, Christmas trees, doves, holly, nativity scenes, poinsettias, the Star of Bethlehem, and wreaths. The use of each of these decorations has its own Christian symbolism and history. For example, church bells are rung in order to celebrate feasts, such as Christmas, Easter, Ascension Day and Pentecost; with respect to Christmas, the use of bells as decorations symbolize the "proclamation of joy that angels sent to the people when Christ was born."

The Advent wreath, which is used to mark the four weeks prior to Christmas and the arrival of Christmas, originated among the Lutherans of Germany in the 16th century. The Christingle, often lit during Christmas church services, was invented by Moravians in 19th century Britain.

Nativity plays were first enacted by Catholic monks in 11th century Italy. Nativity scenes have been the center of the Christmas putz, a tradition of the Moravian Church that is "built to tell the Good News of the coming of the Christ Child" and "is the Gospel in miniature from Isaiah’s prophecy and Mary’s annunciation to the visit of the wisemen and the flight into Egypt." For Moravian Christians, the nativity scene serves to celebrate "the story of the wonder of Christ’s birth so that the Son of God can be welcomed into the hearts of the home at the Christmas."

Light is associated with Christmas as Christians teach that the Nativity of Jesus signifies that "light has come into the world". The father of Lutheran Christianity, Martin Luther, is often credited with adorning a Christmas tree with candles in the 16th century. In the 1800s, candleholders were used to fasten candles on the trees. It was not until 1924 that Christmas lights became affordable and entered households.

In the 1840s, the use of a decoration symbolizing the Star of Bethlehem became popular at the highest point of the Christmas tree.

== Tree ==
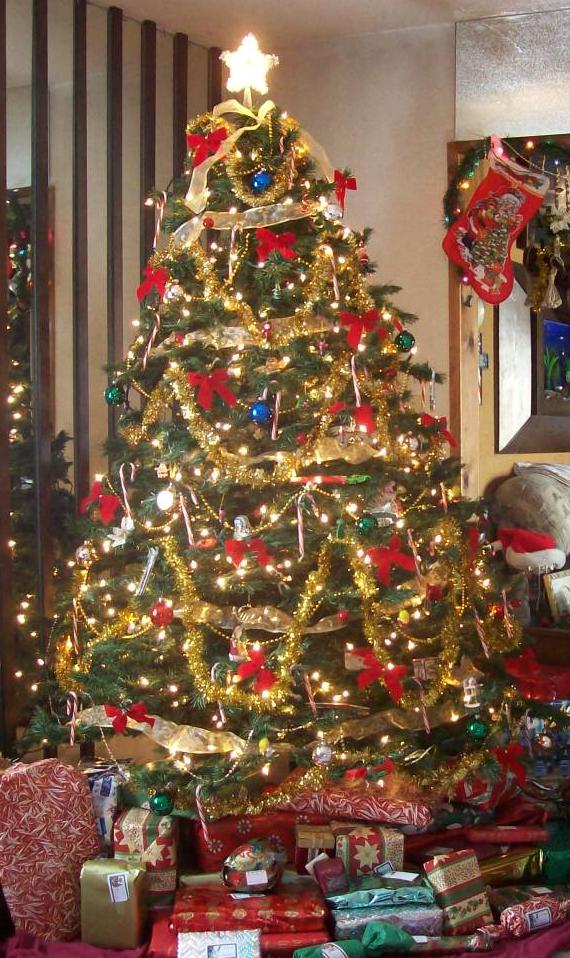
A Christmas tree inside a home, with the top of the tree containing a decoration symbolizing the Star of Bethlehem

The Christmas tree was first used by German Lutherans in the 16th century, with records indicating that a Christmas tree was placed in the Cathedral of Strassburg in 1539, under the leadership of the Protestant Reformer, Martin Bucer. In the United States, these "German Lutherans brought the decorated Christmas tree with them; the Moravians put lighted candles on those trees." When decorating the Christmas tree, many individuals place a star at the top of the tree symbolizing the Star of Bethlehem, a fact recorded by The School Journal in 1897. Professor David Albert Jones of Oxford University writes that in the 19th century, it became popular for people also to use an angel to top the Christmas tree to symbolize the angels mentioned in the accounts of the Nativity of Jesus. In discussions of folklore, some claim that the Christmas tree is a Christianization of pagan tradition and ritual surrounding the winter solstice, which included the use of evergreen boughs, and an adaptation of pagan tree worship; according to eighth-century biographer Æddi Stephanus, Saint Boniface (634–709), who was a missionary in Germany, took an axe to an oak tree dedicated to Thor and pointed out a fir tree, which he stated was a more fitting object of reverence because it pointed to heaven; it had a triangular shape, which he said was symbolic of the Trinity. However, the English-language phrase "Christmas tree" is first recorded in 1835 and represents an importation from the German language. From Germany the custom was introduced to England via two German-born royal consorts, Queen Charlotte and Prince Albert. The influential 1840s image of Queen Victoria's decorated evergreen was republished in the United States. As the first widely circulated picture of a decorated Christmas tree in America, the custom there spread. Christmas trees may be decorated with lights and ornaments. Mount Ingino Christmas Tree in Gubbio in Italy is the tallest Christmas tree in the world.

=== Types of decorations ===
==== Glass ornaments ====
Figural glass Christmas ornaments originated in the small town of Lauscha, Germany in the latter half of the 19th century. The town had long produced fine glassware. The production of Christmas ornaments became a family affair for many people. Some families invested 16 hours a day in production. For some, it was their sole source of income.

Sometimes, competitions were held. Prizes were awarded to the family, producing the finest examples. Santa Clauses, angels, birds, animals, and other traditional Yuletide subjects were favorites.

F.W. Woolworth discovered these glass ornaments on a toy and doll-buying trip to Sonnenburg, Germany, in the 1890s. He sold them in his "five and ten cent" stores in America. The ornaments were said to have contributed to Woolworth's business success.

For the American market, figures depicting comic book characters and patriotic subjects such as Uncle Sams, eagles, and flags were blown. Glassblowers have held on to the old molds. Glass ornaments are still created from these old molds.

===== Method =====
A clear glass tube is heated over an open flame. It is then inserted into a mold. The glassblower then blows into the end of the tube. The glass expands to fill the mold. The glass takes on the shape of the mold. It is cooled. A silver nitrate solution is swirled about inside the ornament. This gives the ornament a silver glow. The outside of the ornament is painted or decorated with metal trims, paper clippings, etc.

==== Cotton batting ====
Cotton batting Christmas ornaments were popular during the German Christmas toy and decoration boom at the turn of the century. They were exported in large numbers to the United States. These decorations suggested puffs of snow. Fruits and vegetables were popular subjects and often had a realistic appearance. African-American and patriotic characters were fashioned for the American market. Some ornaments were used to hide boxes of candy.

Assembling these decorations was a cottage industry. Cotton batting was wound around a wire frame resembling a human or animal. A face was painted, or a lithograph cut-out was affixed to the batting. Figures were given crepe paper costumes. Some were touched with glue and sprinkled with mica flakes for a glittering appearance.

==== Dresden ====
Dresdens are three-dimensional ornaments. They are made of paper, card, or cardboard. Dresdens were produced mostly in Dresden and Leipzig, Germany, from the 1860s to WWI. They were originally priced between 1 and 60 cents. Subjects included animals and birds, suns and moons, humans, carriages and ships, etc. Some Dresdens were flat, allowing the buyer to collect them in scrapbooks.

Positive and negative molds were set into a press. A moistened sheet of card was put into the press. The images were pressed. When they had dried, they were sent to cottage workers for the finishing touches. This involved separating the form-halves from the card, trimming ragged edges, and gluing the two halves together. The form was then gilded, silvered, or hand-painted. Sometimes, a small gift or sweet was put into the form. Forms were usually no larger than five inches.

== Nativity scenes ==
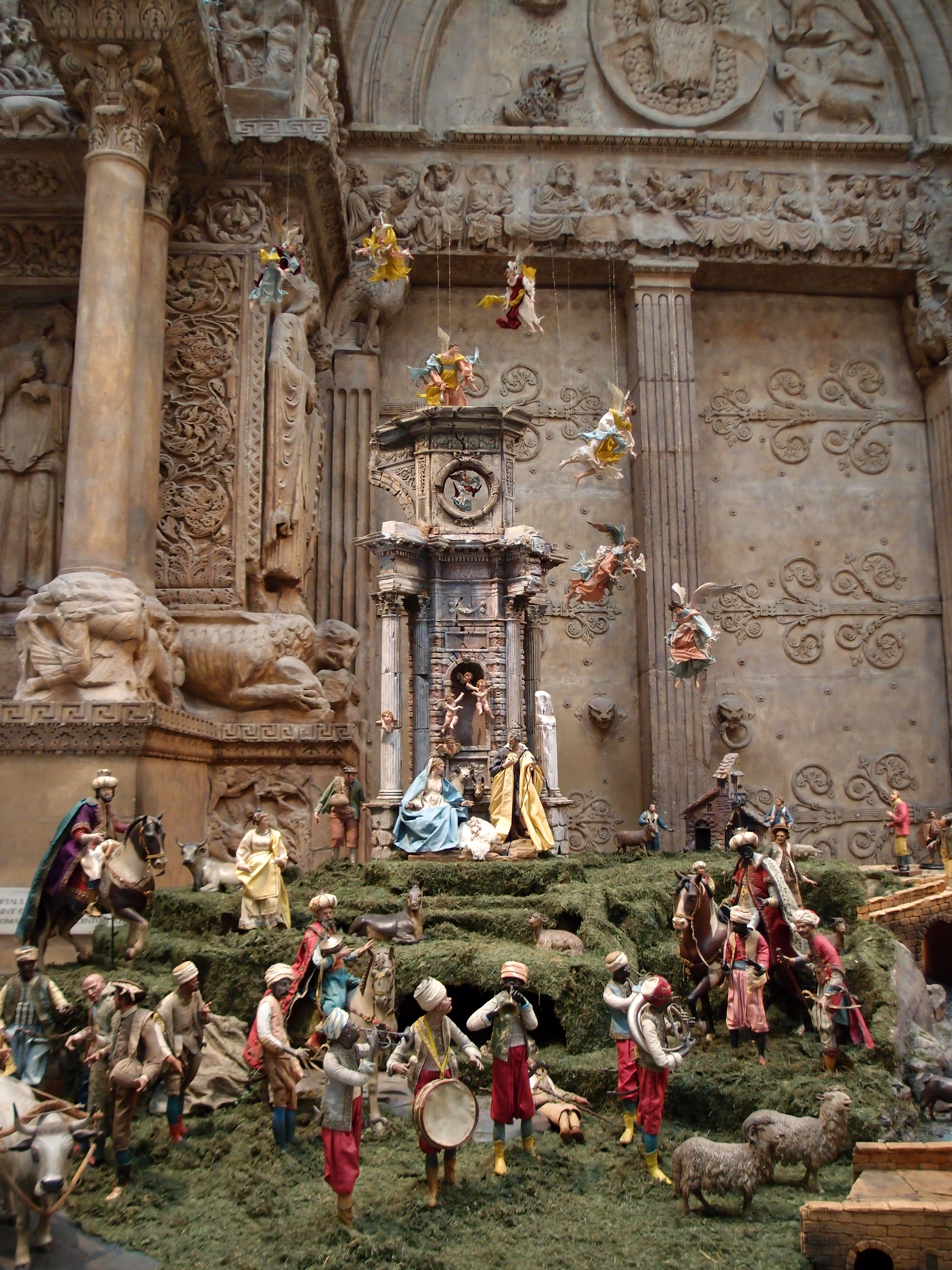
Neapolitan presepio at the Carnegie Museum of Art in Pittsburgh

Nativity scenes are known from 10th-century Rome. The first living nativity scene, attributed to Saint Francis of Assisi, occurred in 1223 in the Italian town of Greccio, quickly spreading across Europe. Different types of decorations developed across the Christian world, dependent on local tradition and available resources, and can vary from simple representations of the crib to far more elaborate sets – renowned manger scene traditions include the colourful Kraków szopka in Poland, which imitate Kraków's historical buildings as settings, the elaborate Italian presepi (Neapolitan ^{[it]}, Genoese ^{[it]} and Bolognese ^{[it]}), or the Provençal crèches in southern France, using hand-painted terracotta figurines called santons. In Malta, light-deprived vetches (ġulbiena) are placed next to the statue of the baby Jesus in the manger and static nativity scenes adorning houses and churches.

In certain parts of the world, notably Sicily, living nativity scenes following the tradition of Saint Francis are a popular alternative to static crèches. The first commercially produced decorations appeared in Germany in the 1860s, inspired by paper chains made by children. In countries where a representation of the Nativity scene is very popular, people are encouraged to compete and create the most original or realistic ones. Within some families, the pieces used to make the representation are considered a valuable family heirloom.

== Plants ==
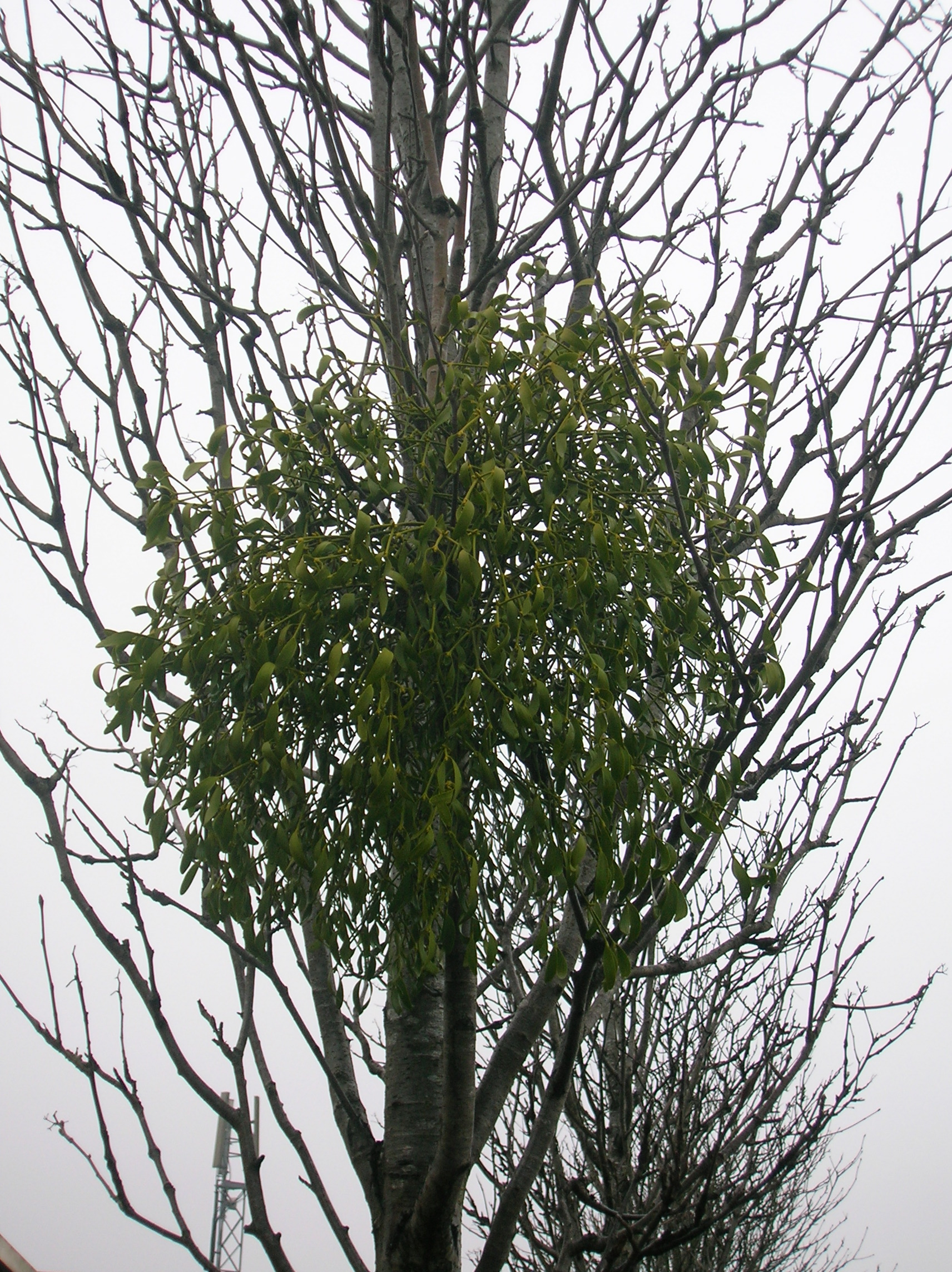
Mistletoe

Popular Christmas plants include holly, mistletoe, ivy and Christmas trees. The interior of a home may be decorated with these plants, along with garlands and evergreen foliage. These often come with small ornaments tied to the delicate branches and sometimes with a small light set.

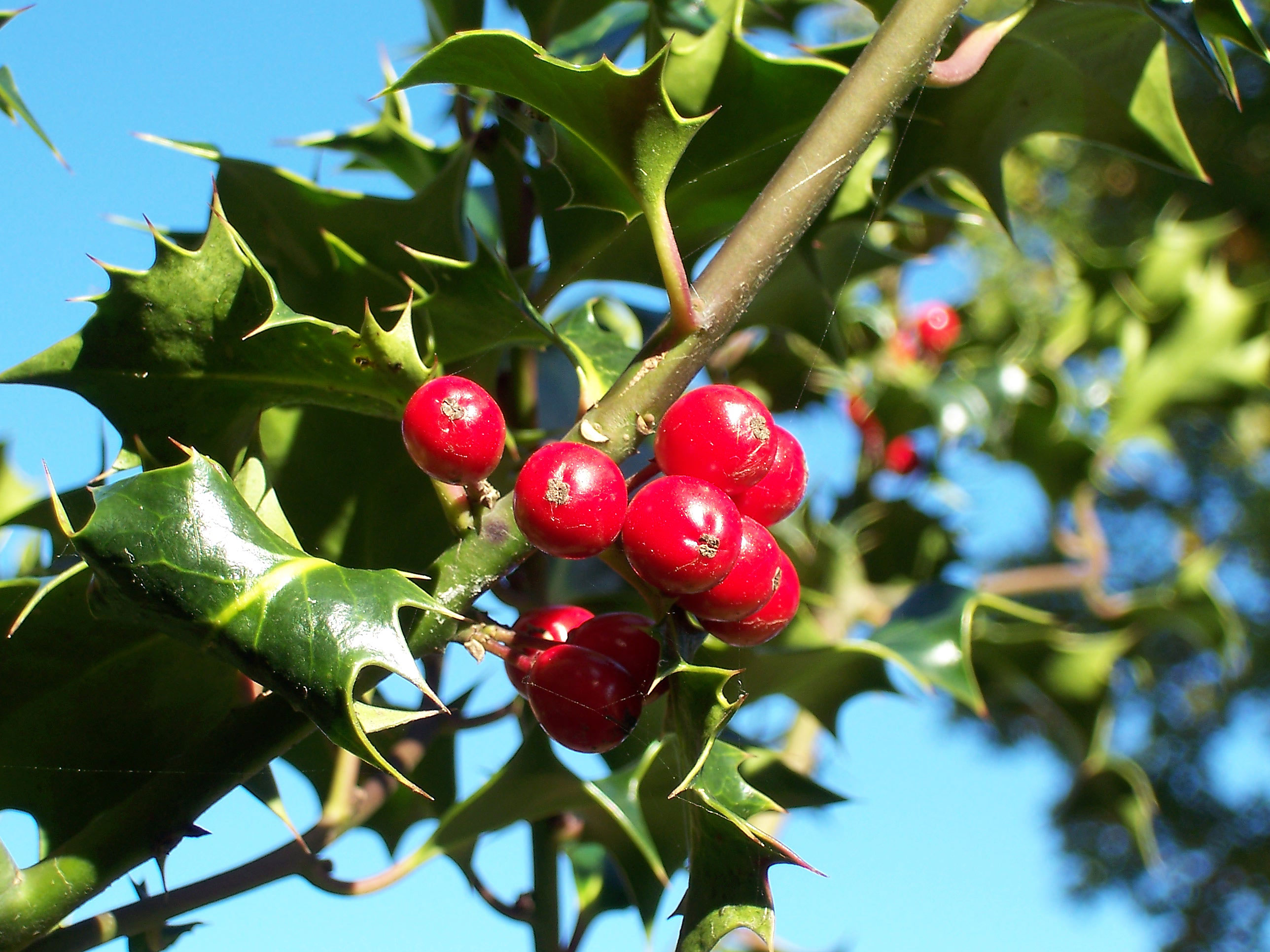
European Holly, traditional Christmas decoration

Wreaths are made from real or artificial conifer branches, or sometimes other broadleaf evergreens or holly. Several types of evergreen or even deciduous branches may be used in the same wreath, along with pinecones and sprays of berries, and Christmas ornaments including jingle bells. A bow is usually used at the top or bottom, and an electric or unlit candle may be placed in the middle. Christmas lights are often used, and they may be hung from doors or windows, and sometimes walls, lampposts, light fixtures, or even statuary.

From the 17th century, friars of the Franciscan Christian religious order in Mexico included the plants in their Christmas celebrations. The star-shaped leaf pattern of the poinsettia is said to symbolize the Star of Bethlehem, the red color represents the blood shed during the sacrifice of Jesus' crucifixion, and the white leaves represent the purity of Jesus.

Taking down Christmas decorations before Twelfth Night/Epiphany Eve (January 5), as well as leaving the decorations up beyond Candlemas (February 2), is historically considered to be inauspicious. For example, in some parts of England, people believed that if Christmas greenery were thrown away instead of being burned, a ghost would appear, but in other parts, they believed that if the greenery were burned instead of being thrown away, a family member would die.

== Outdoors ==
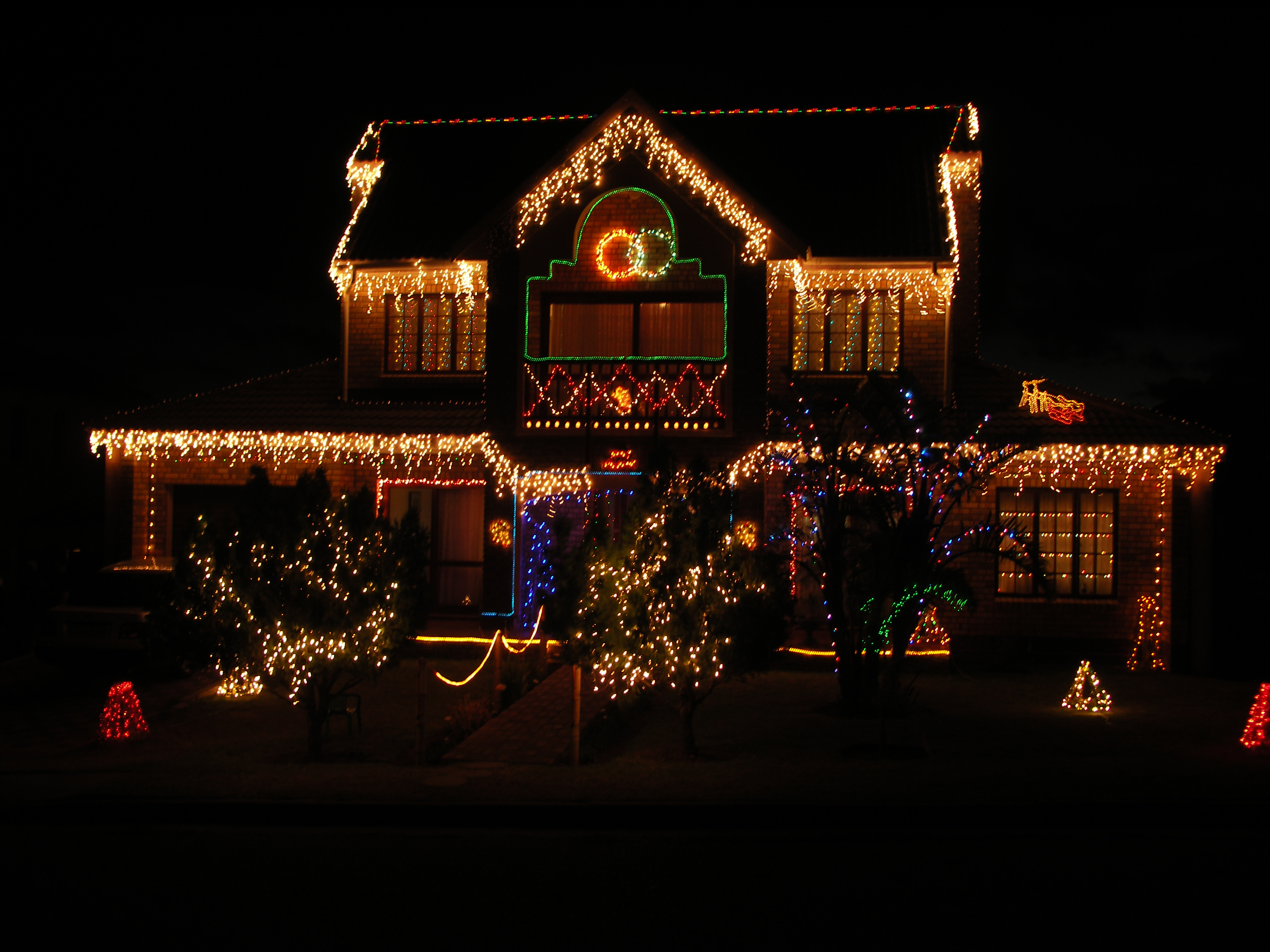
A house decorated for Christmas

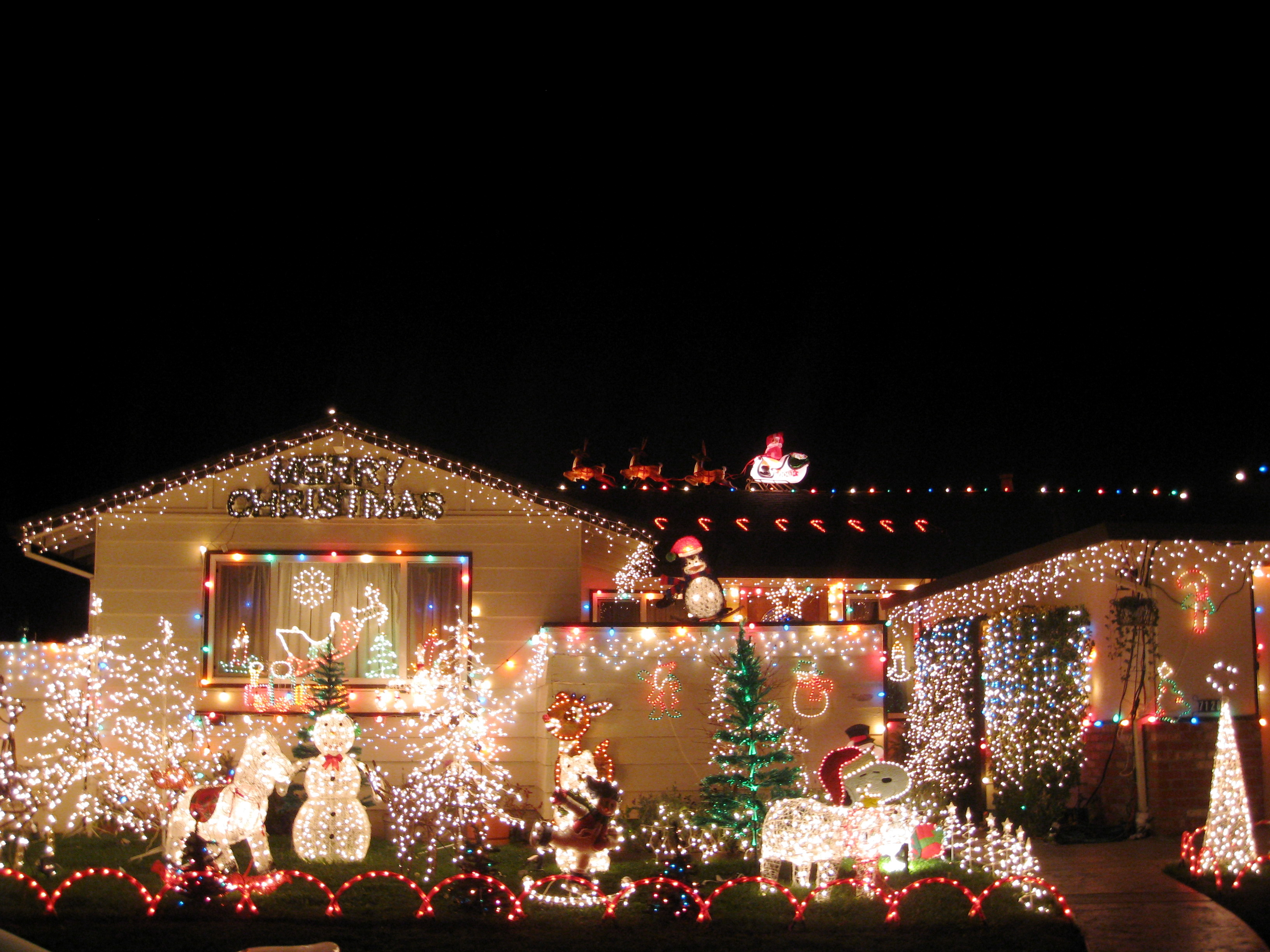
Christmas decoration of a house in Dublin, California

In North and South America, Australia, and Europe, it is traditional to decorate the outside of houses with lights and sometimes with illuminated sleighs, snowmen, and other Christmas figures. Municipalities often sponsor decorations as well. Christmas banners may be hung from street lights and Christmas trees placed in the town square.

== Others ==
In the Western world, rolls of brightly colored paper with secular or religious Christmas/winter/Hanukkah motifs are manufactured for giftwrapping presents. The display of Christmas villages has also become a tradition in many homes this season. Other traditional decorations include bells, reindeer, candles, candy canes, garland, stockings, wreaths, snow globes, and angels. Snow sheets are made specifically for simulating snow under a tree or village.

In many countries, a representation of the Nativity scene is prevalent, and people are encouraged to compete and create the most original or realistic ones. Within some families, the pieces used to make the representation are considered a valuable family heirloom. Some churches also perform a live Nativity with volunteers and even live animals.

Among the most popular items of Christmas decorations are stockings. According to legend, Saint Nicholas would creep in through the chimney and slip gold into stockings hanging by the fireplace. Various forms of stockings are available, from simple velvet ones to sock-shaped bags to animated ones.

== Season ==
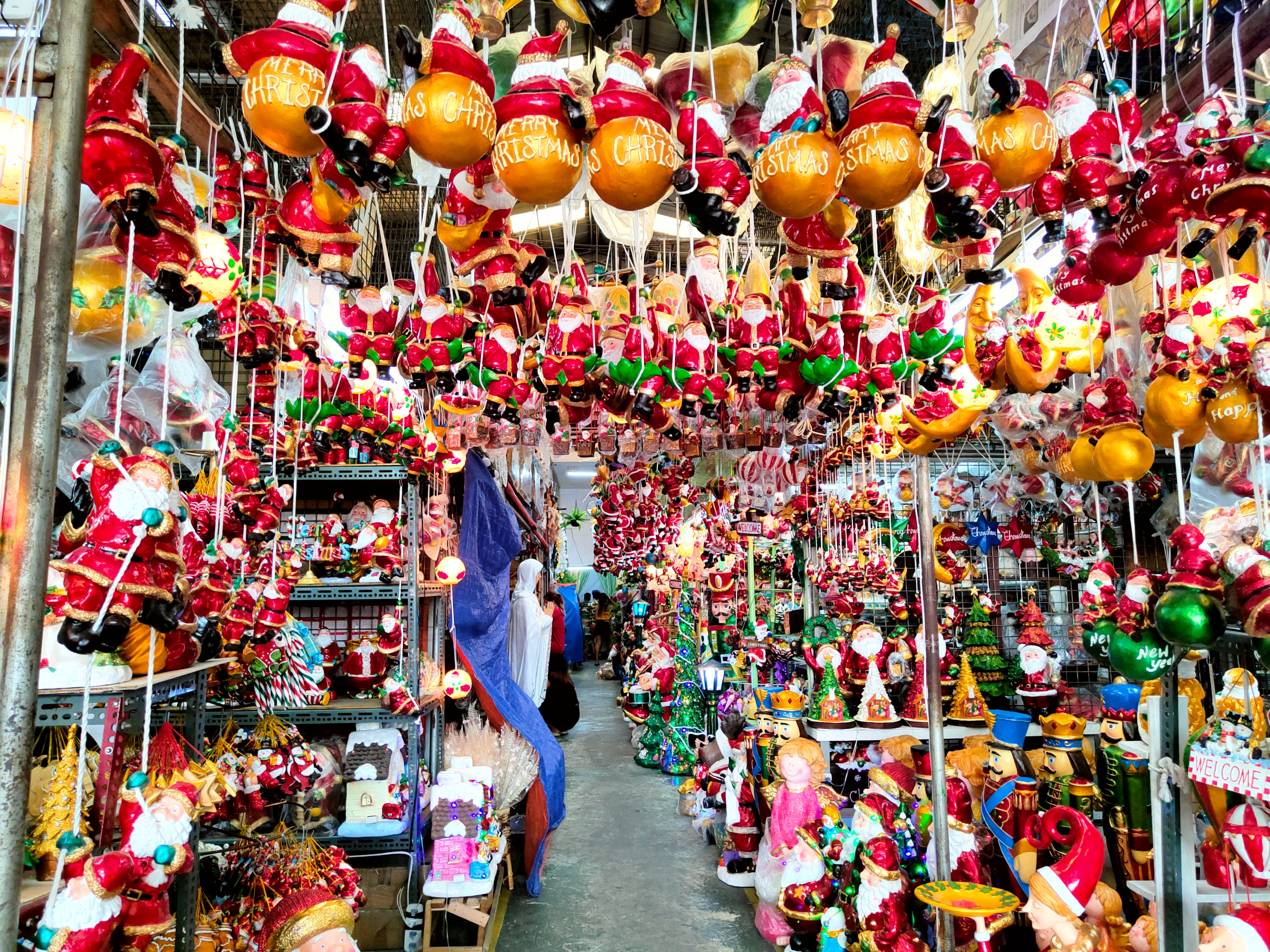
Santa Claus figurines and other Christmas decorations sold in Quezon City, Philippines ahead of the "ber" months on August 31, 2022

Christmas decorations are typically put up in late November or early December, usually to coincide with the start of Advent. In the UK, Christmas lights on the high street are generally switched on in November. In the US, the traditional start of the holiday season is Thanksgiving. Major retailers put their seasonal decorations out for sale after back-to-school sales, while smaller niche Christmas Stores sell Christmas decorations year round.

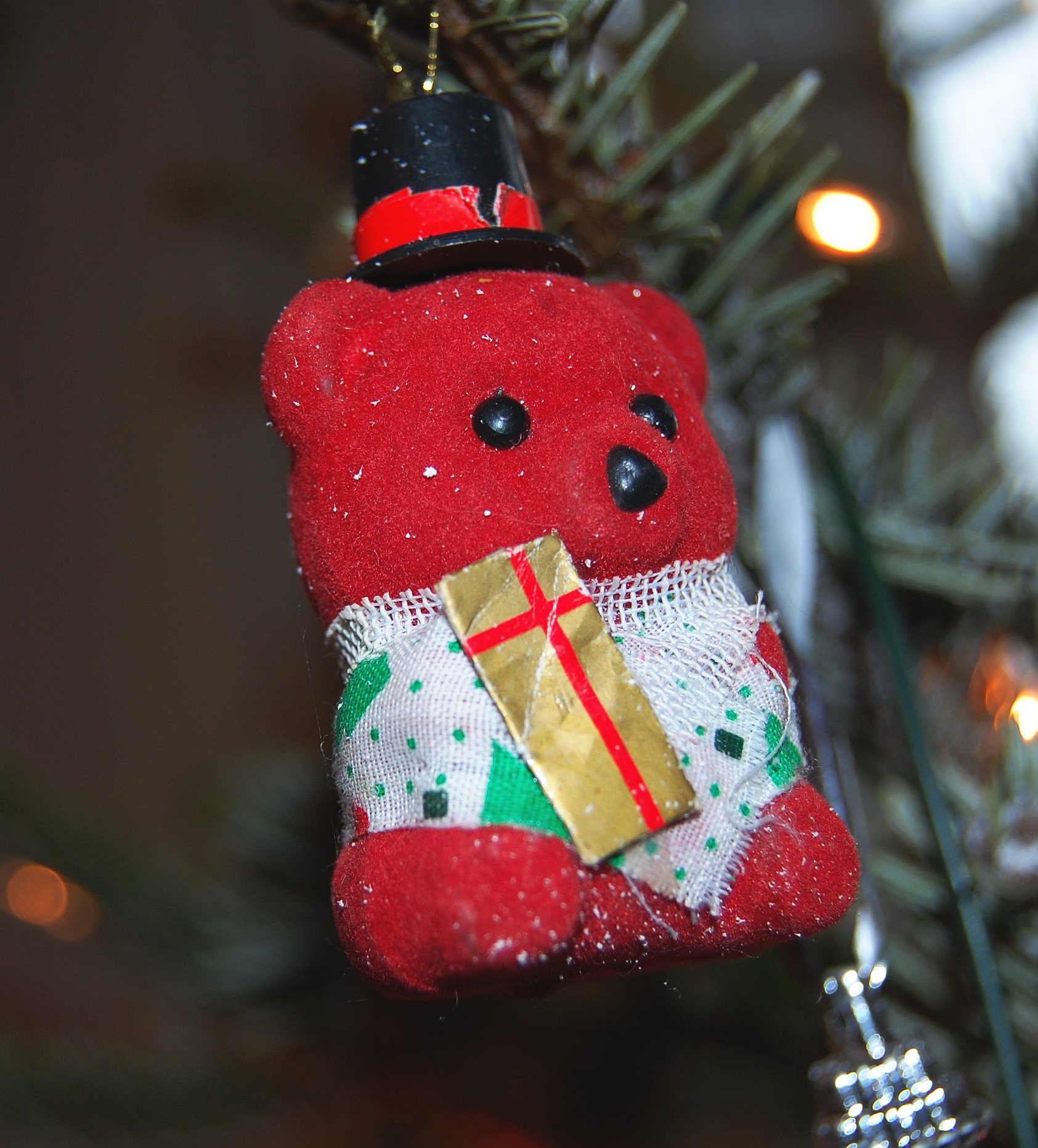
A Christmas tree ornament

In some places, Christmas decorations are traditionally taken down on Twelfth Night, the evening of January 5 or January 6. The difference in this date is that some count Christmas Day as the first day of Christmas, whereas for others, Christmas Day is a feast day in its own right, and the first full day of the Christmas Season is December 26. In Hispanic and other cultures, this is more like Christmas Eve, as the Three Wise Men bring gifts that night. Therefore, decorations are left up longer. The same is true in Eastern Churches which often observe Christmas according to the Julian Calendar, thus making it fall 13 days later.

In England, it was customary to burn the decorations in the hearth. However, this tradition has fallen out of favour as reusable and imperishable decorations made of plastics, wood, glass and metal became more popular. If a Yule log has been kept alight since Christmas Day, it is put out, and the ashes are kept to be included in the fire on the following Christmas Day. A superstition exists which suggests that if decorations are kept up after Twelfth Night, they must be kept up until the following Twelfth Night, but also that if the decorations for the current Christmas are taken down before the New Year begins, bad luck shall befall the house for a whole year.

In the United States, many stores immediately remove decorations the day after Christmas, as some think of the holiday season as being over once Christmas has passed. A vast majority of Americans who put up home decorations keep them out and lit until at least New Year's Day, and inside decorations can often be seen in windows for several weeks afterward.

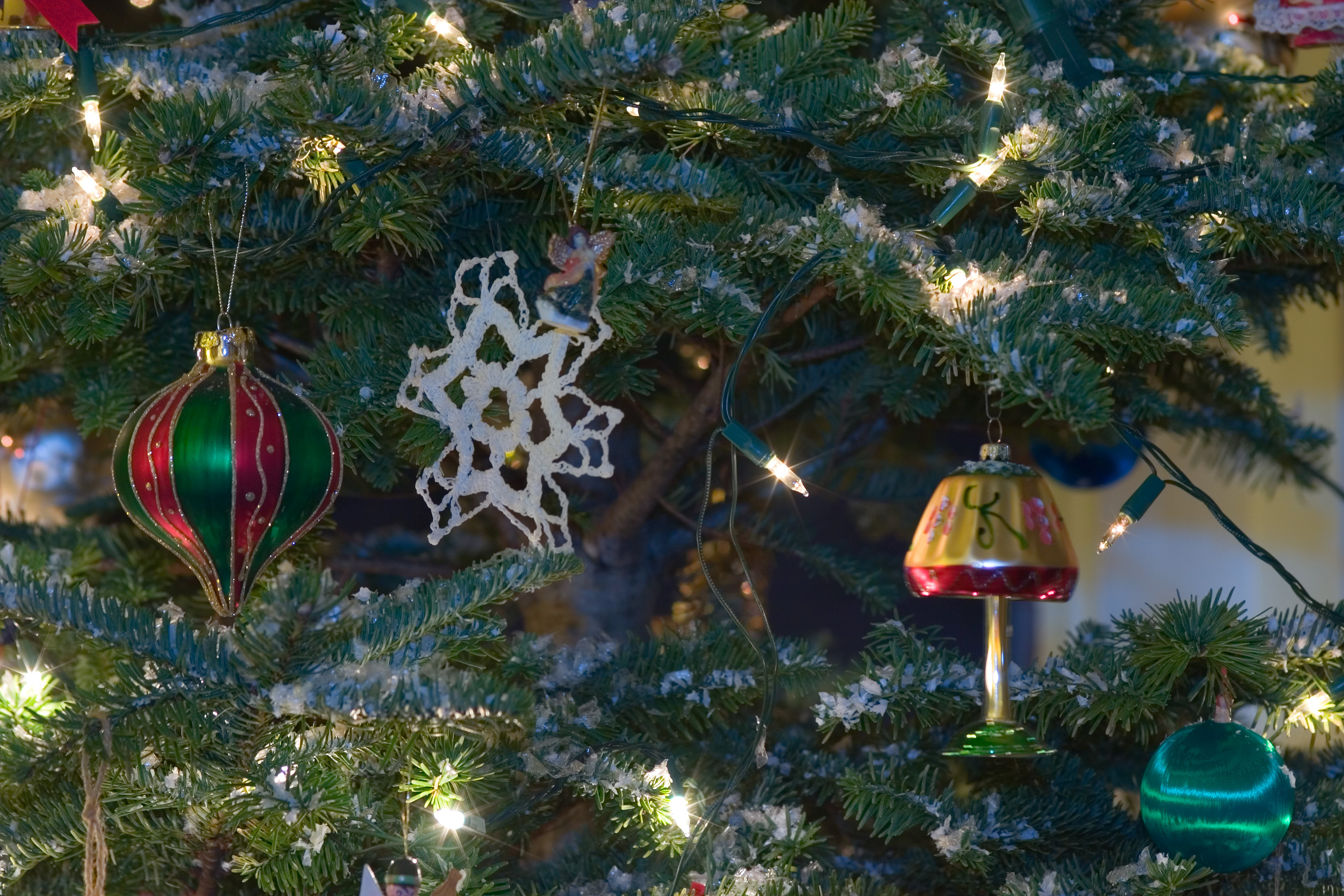
Christmas ornaments hanging on a Christmas Tree

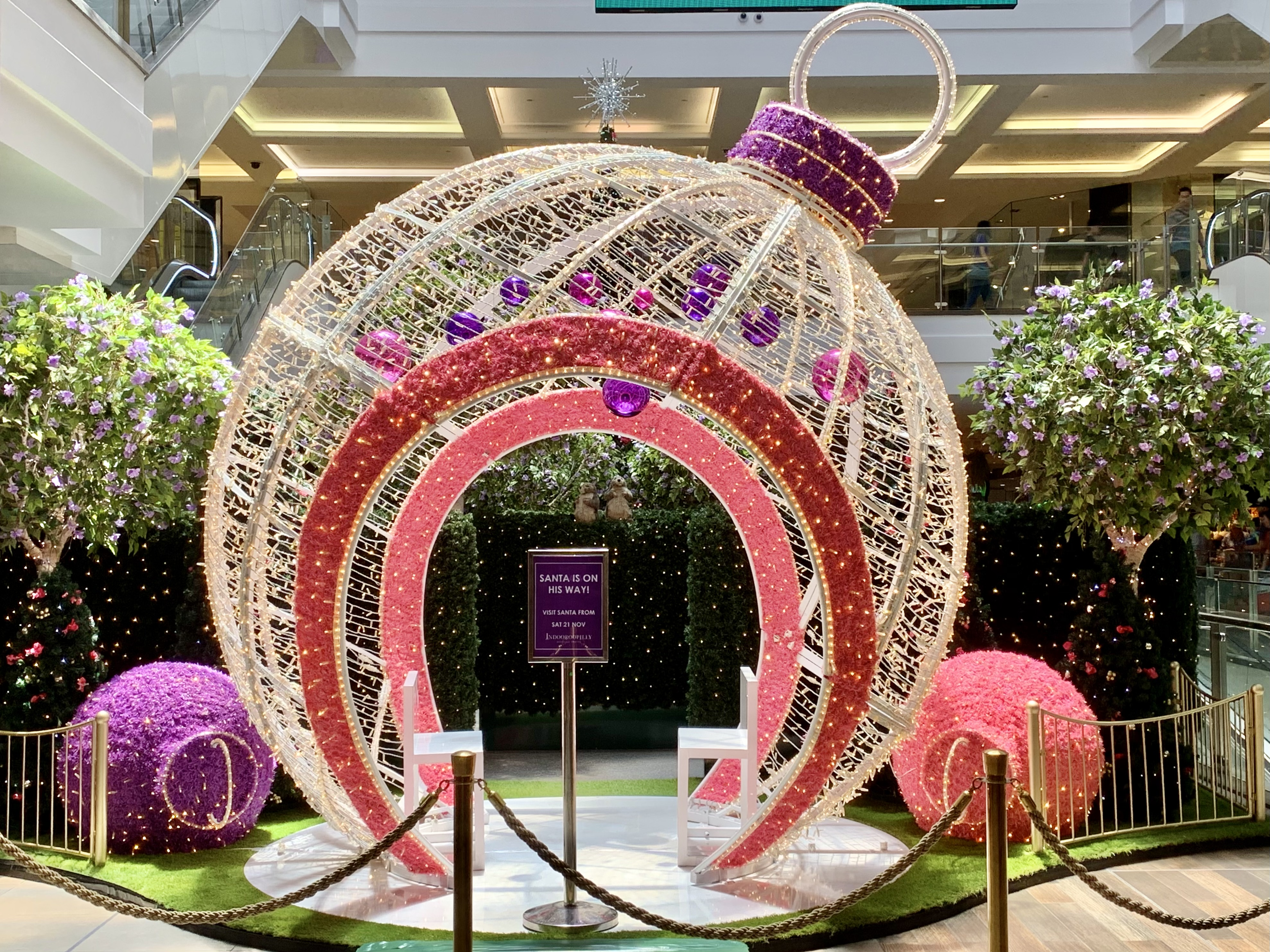
Christmas decorations at the Indooroopilly Shopping Centre, Australia, 2020

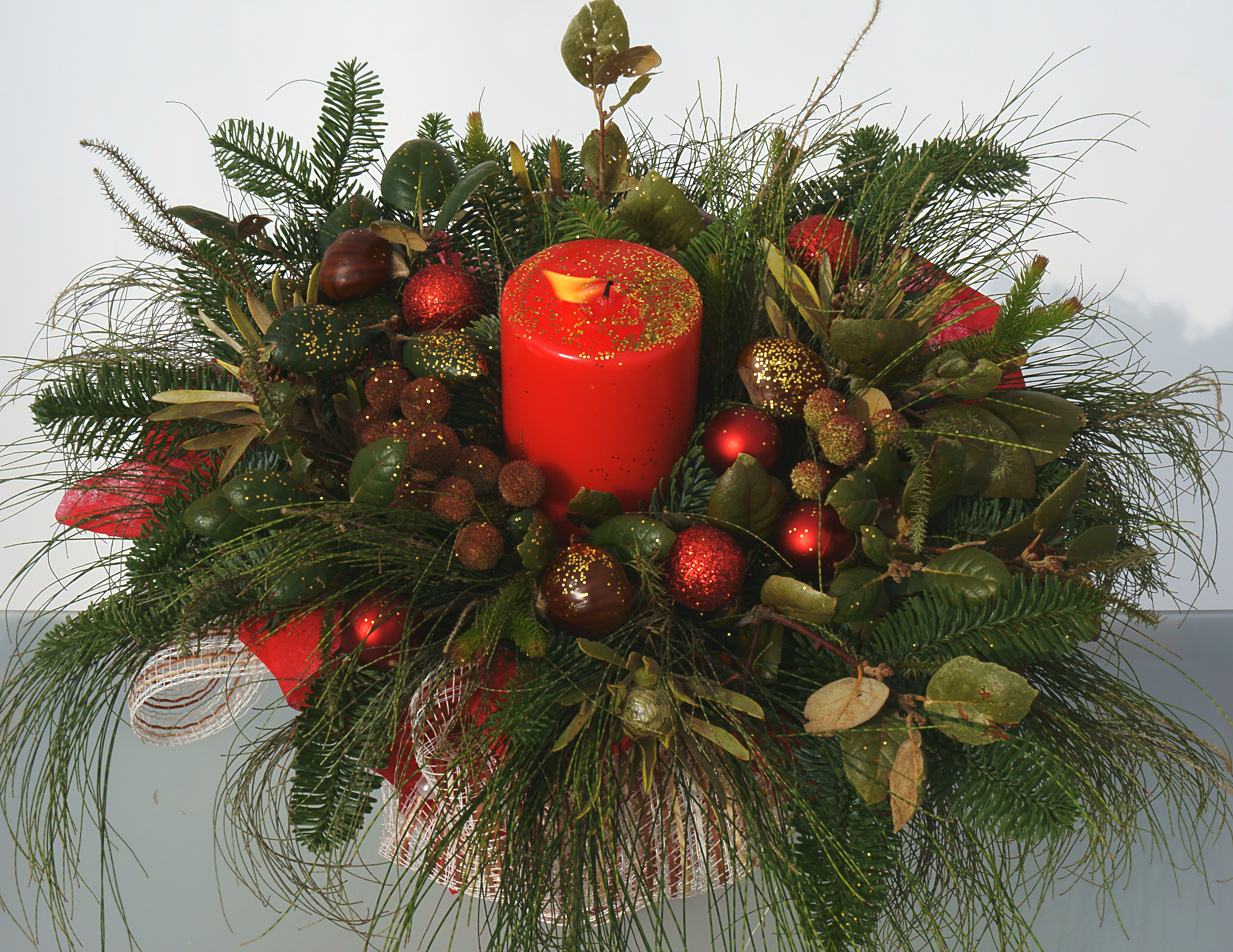
Christmas wreath
