= Illumination (decoration) =

An illumination placed in a windowsill for the Advent, Christmas, and Epiphany seasons

An illumination is an Advent, Christmastide, and Epiphanytide decoration in the form of a lighted candle originating in the Moravian Church. These lighted candles are placed in the windows of Moravian Christian churches and homes in the evening with the symbolism to "guide the footsteps of the infant Jesus" to their settlements. Diane Frantz, a Moravian librarian explicated this, stating that "the Christ child bearing bundles of evergreens wanders all over the world. Those who long for his coming set a lighted candle in the window to welcome him into their home and hearts." Illuminations are first erected on the First Sunday of Advent and are traditionally removed at the end of the Christmastide-Epiphanytide season, which is historically Candlemas. Illuminations are popular in Moravian settlements such as Old Salem, Bethlehem and Lititz, though this custom has spread among the membership of other Christian denominations. In the Moravian town of Herrnhaag, due to the abundance of illuminations there "it appeared from Budingen as though the whole hilltop were a single sea of flames." Brought by Moravian missionaries from Saxony to Bethlehem, illuminations were first used in North America as early as 1741. Though illuminations are traditionally lighted candles, in the modern day, these can be electric candles.

== See also ==
- Christingle
- Lovefeast
- Moravian star
- Nativity scene
