= Christingle =

Symbolic Christian object

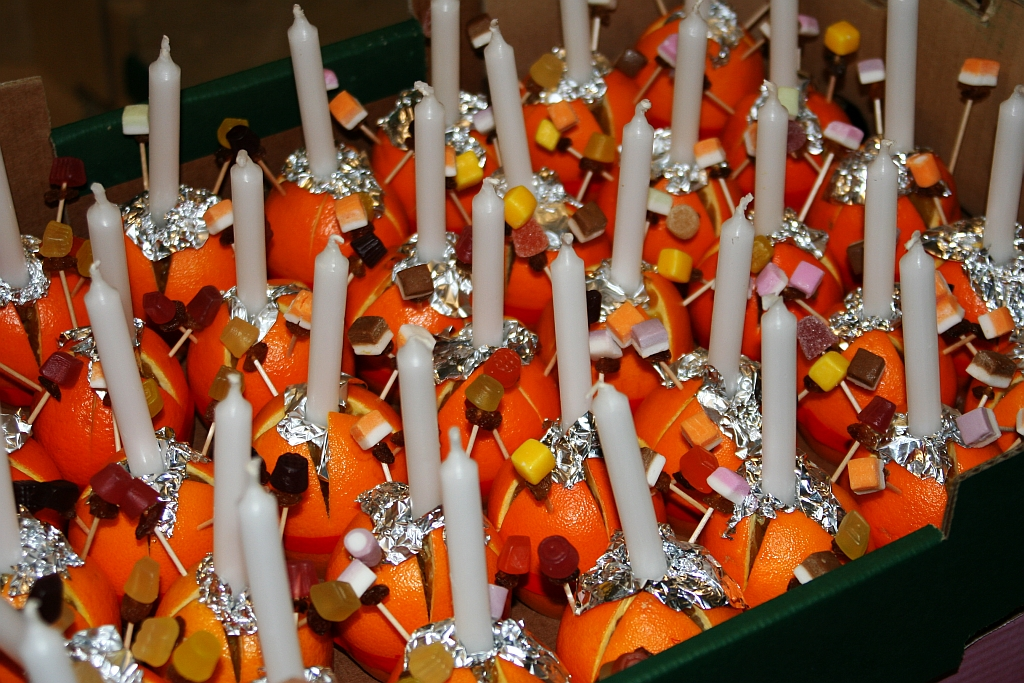
Christingles prepared for a Christmas Eve service

A Christingle is a symbolic object used in the Advent, Christmas, and Epiphany services of many Protestant denominations. It symbolises the birth of Christ, the Light of the World. A modern Christingle is made from a candle in an orange (representing the light and the world respectively) which is typically decorated with a red ribbon and sweets or dried fruit. It originated in Moravian Church in the middle of the 18th century and has been a feature in Moravian churches across the United Kingdom since before the World Wars. As members of Moravian churches moved away from their home congregations, they took the custom of Christingles with them and introduced it to other denominations. In the 1960s John Pensom adopted it as a fundraising tool for the Children's Society of the Church of England.

== History ==
The history of the Christingle can be traced back to Moravian Bishop Johannes de Watteville, who started the tradition in Germany 20 December 1747 in Castle of Marienborn, near Frankfurt as "an attempt to get children to think about Jesus". At that time it was just a red ribbon wrapped around a candle.

In the intervening years, the Moravian Church spread the tradition of Christingle through their early role in the Protestant missionary movement.

The custom was popularized in the United Kingdom by John Pensom in 1968. He was raising funds for the charity The Children's Society. Service spread throughout the Anglican Communion and later to other Protestant churches, with over 5,000 Christingle services held in the 2000s . At these services, held at different times during Advent, children are presented with Christingles, were being held in the UK every year. In 2018, over 6,000 services were held for The Children's Society. Each year, Christingle raises over £1.2 million to help vulnerable young people. The term is currently used to define both the service and the object.

In 2018, The Children's Society launched its #Christingle50 campaign, which included festive services in schools and churches for the 50th year.

== Construction ==
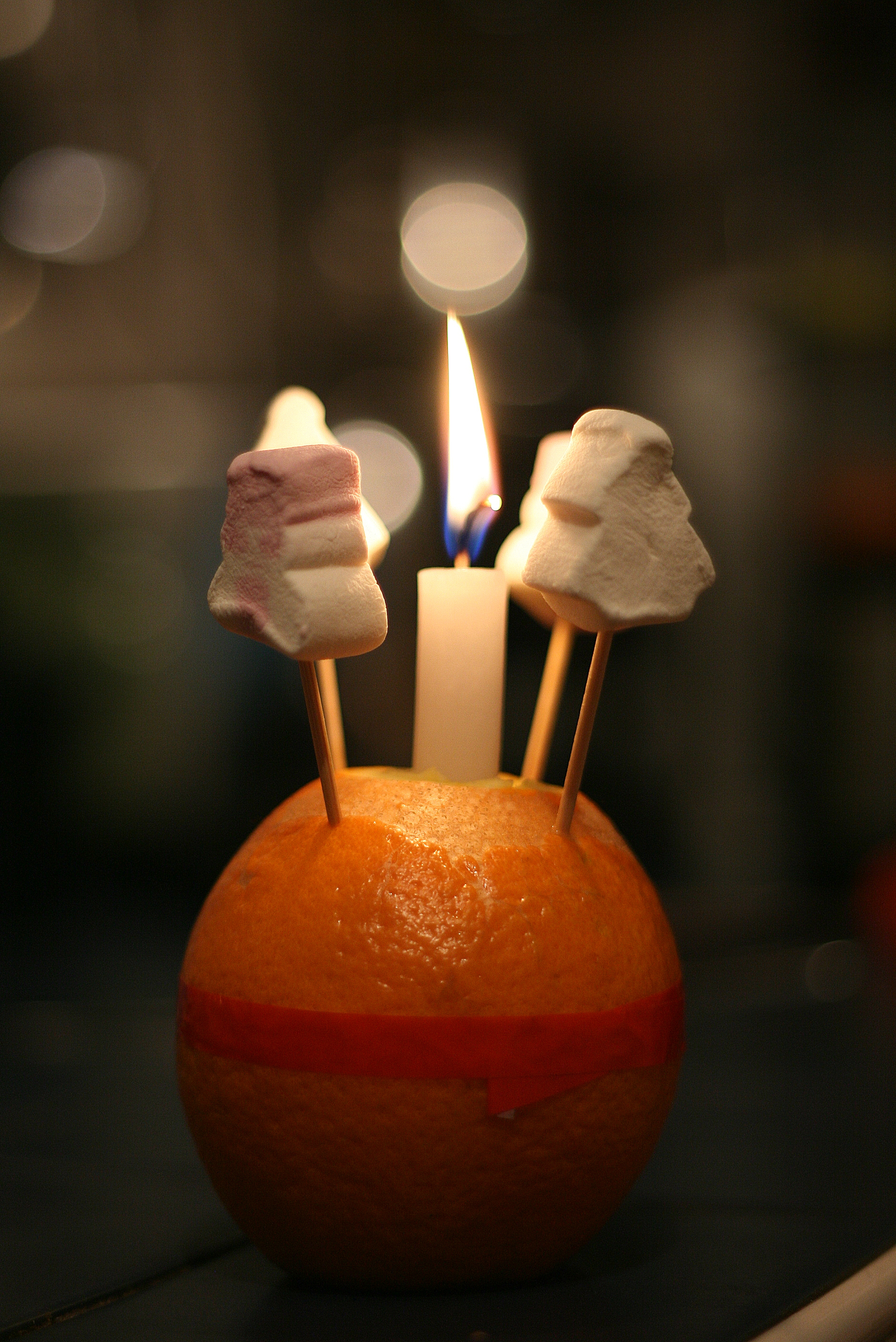
A Christingle after being lit, with marshmallows skewered on the cocktail sticks

A Christingle usually consists of:

- An orange, representing the world
- A candle pushed into the centre of the orange, then lit, representing Jesus Christ as Light of the World
- A red ribbon wrapped around the orange or a paper frill around the candle, representing the blood of Christ
- Dried fruits and/or sweets skewered on cocktail sticks pushed into the orange, representing the fruits of the earth and the four seasons.

Other additions to the Christingle may include:

- Aluminium foil placed underneath and around the base of the candle, to prevent accidental burns from molten candle wax
- Cloves studded into the orange, as a replacement for the dried fruits and/or sweets, making it into a modern pomander
- Glow sticks were introduced at Chelmsford Cathedral in the UK in 2006 as a safer alternative to candles, due to concerns of children's hair catching on fire.

== Etymology ==
There is no agreement on the etymology of the word. One suggestion is that the name Christingle probably derives from a German dialectical word Christkindl, meaning 'Christ-child' or 'Christmas gift'.

Alternatively the name is interpreted as:

- 'Christ Light', given that the orange and candle symbolise the Light of the World;
- a derivative of Gaelic aingeal ("fire", as in "inglenook");
- a diminutive of Latin: ignis ("fire"), igniculus.

== See also ==
- Moravian star

== Sources ==
- Short, D. (2003). "The Broader Czech (and Slovak) Contribution to the English Lexicon". Central Europe. 1 (1): 19–39. doi:10.1179/147909603789838765.
