= Moravian star =

Christmas decoration

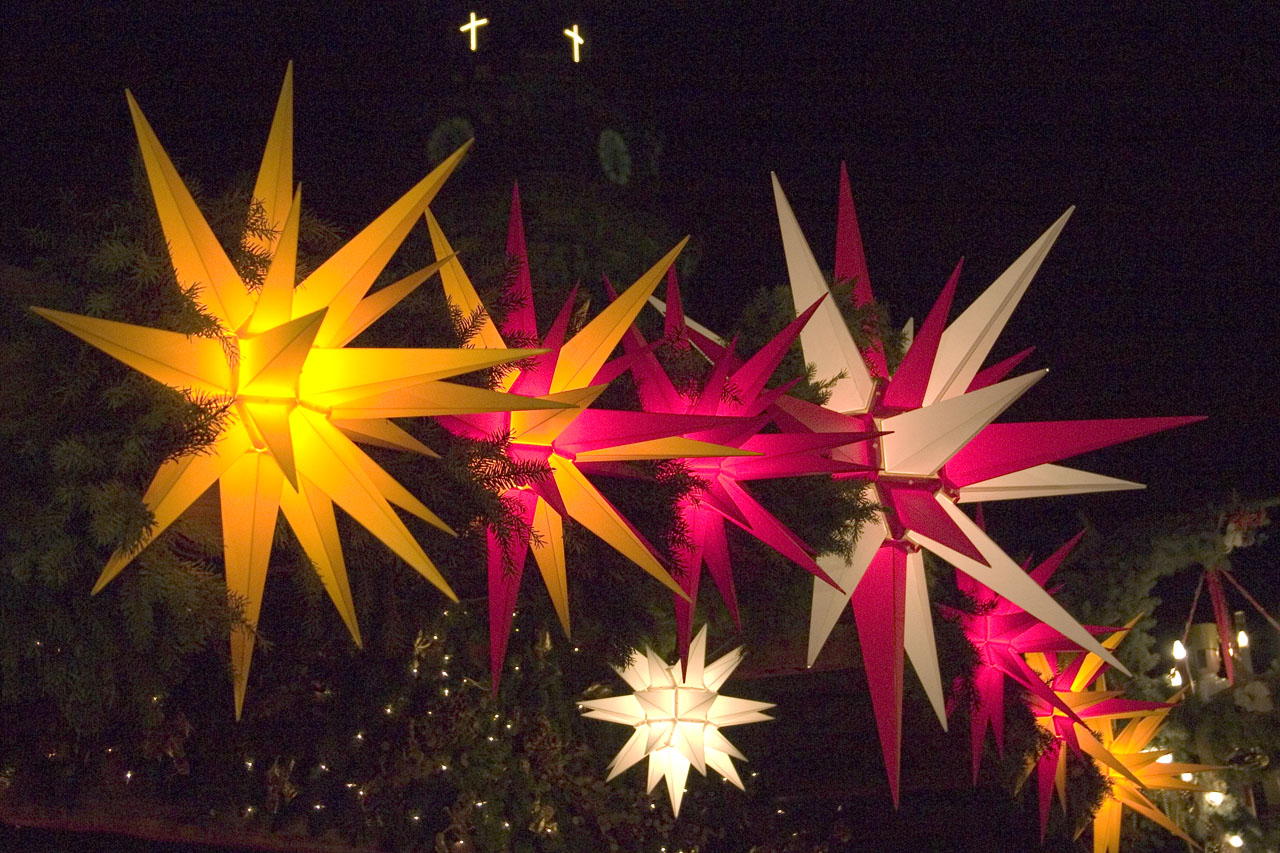
Moravian stars in the Striezelmarkt in Dresden

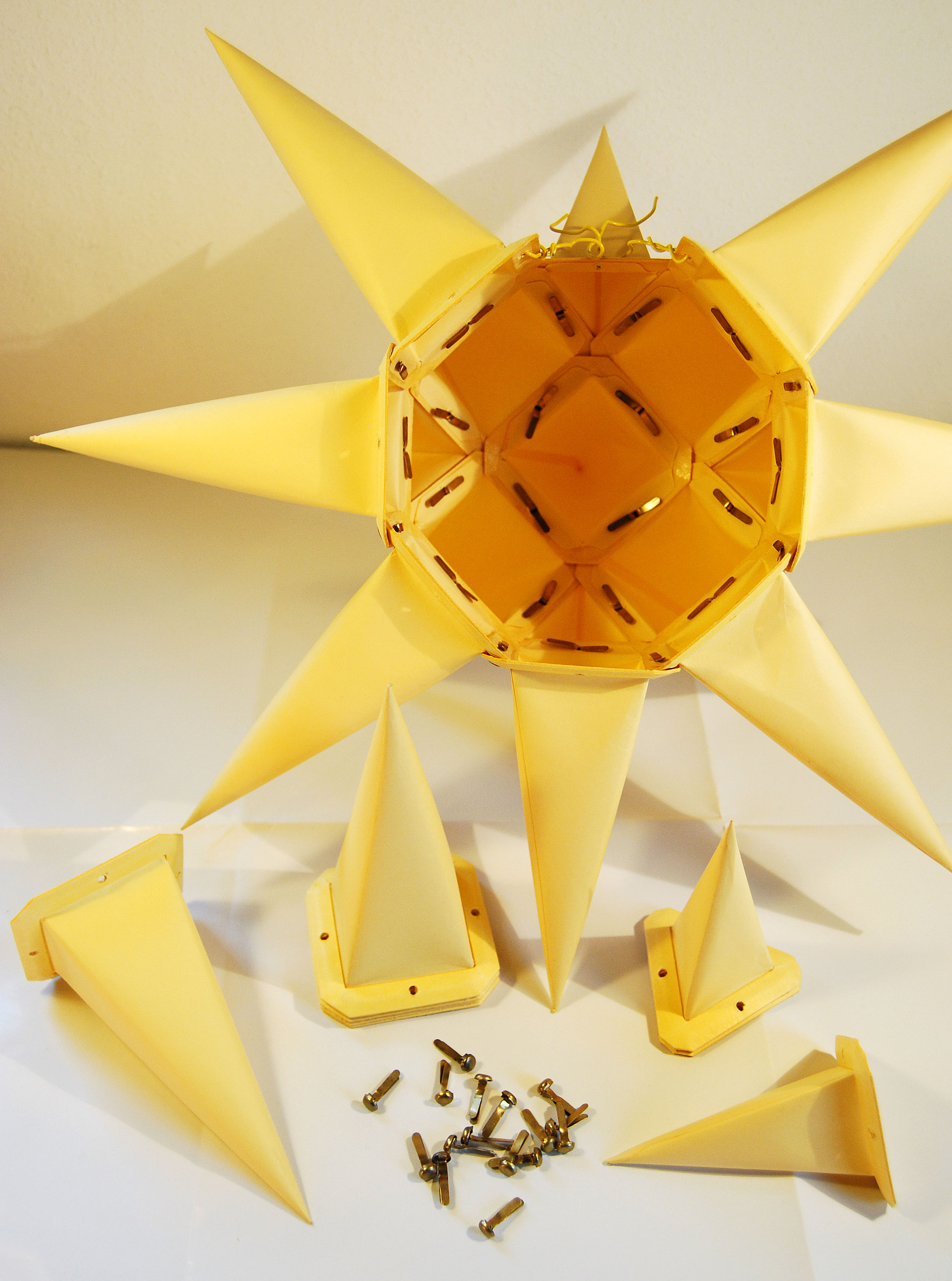
A Moravian star half assembled

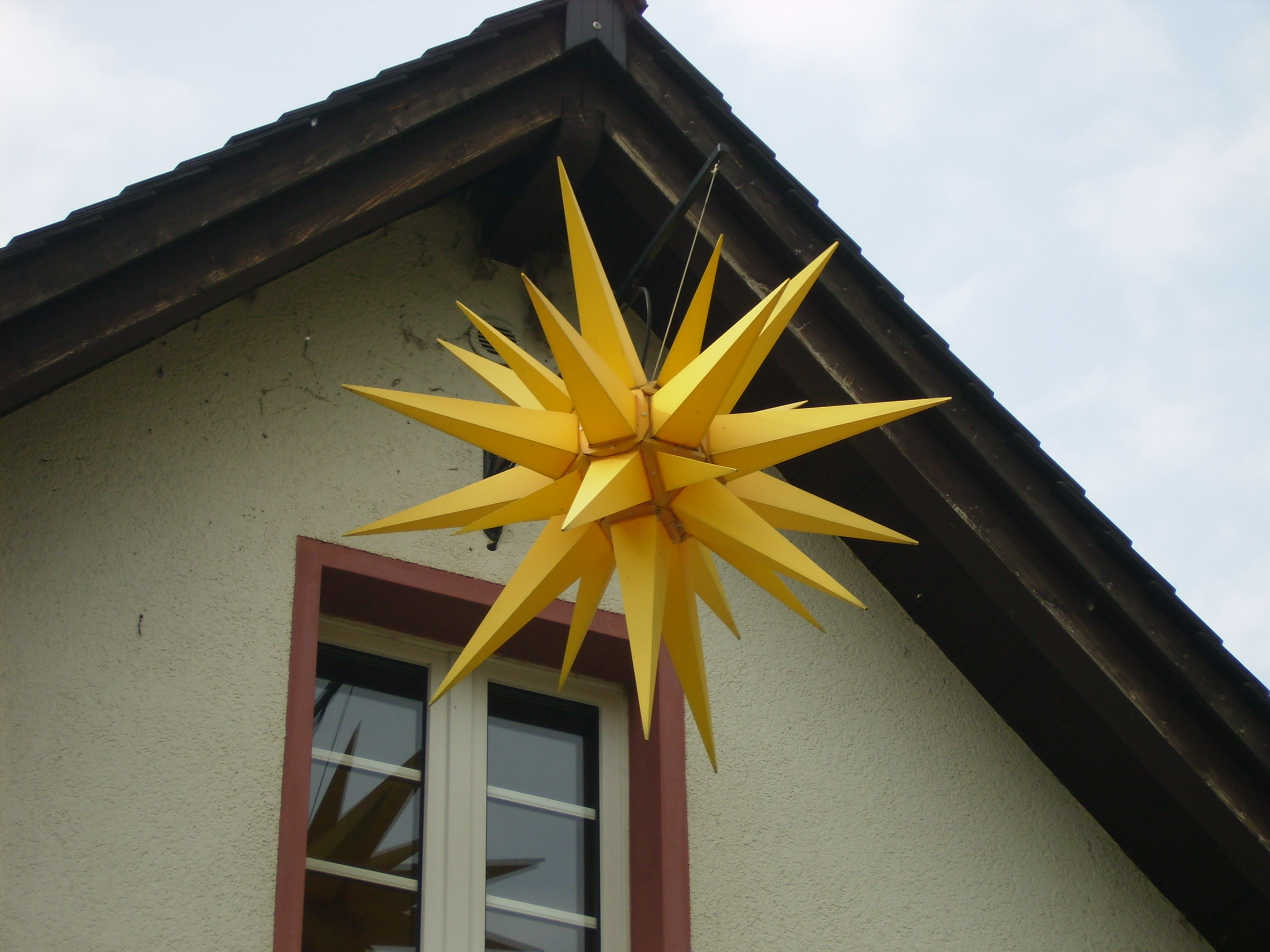
A completed Moravian star hanging by a church

A Moravian star (German: Herrnhuter Stern) is an illuminated decoration used during the Christian liturgical seasons of Advent, Christmas, and Epiphany representing the Star of Bethlehem pointing towards the infant Jesus. The Moravian Church teaches:

...the star reminds us of God, who caused the light to shine out of darkness and of the light which is the life of humanity. It reminds us of the promise of Abraham that his descendants would be more numerous than the stars; we are reminded of the star that pointed to the “great and heavenly light from Bethlehem’s manger shining bright.” The Light shines in the darkness, and the darkness has not overcome it. This is the message of the Advent star, which also points to Jesus, who said, “I am the bright and Morning Star.” It is the star of promise, the star of fulfillment, and the star of hope.

The Moravian star is popular in places where there are Moravian Christian congregations worldwide. The stars take their English name from the Moravian Church, originating in Moravia. In Germany, they are known as Herrnhut stars, named after the Moravian Mother Community in Saxony, Germany, where they were first commercially produced. With the rise of ecumenism, the use of the Moravian star has spread beyond the Moravian Church to other Christian denominations, such as the Lutheran Church and Catholic Church, as well as the Methodist Church.

== History ==
The first Moravian star is known to have originated in the 1830s at the Moravian Boys' School in Niesky, Germany, as a geometry lesson or project. The first mention is of a 110-point star for the 50th anniversary of the Paedagogium (classical school for boys) in Niesky. Around 1880, Peter Verbeek, an alumnus of the school, began making the stars and their instructions available for sale through his bookstore. His son Harry went on to found the Herrnhut Star Factory, which was the main source of stars until World War I. Although heavily damaged at the end of World War II, the Star Factory resumed manufacturing them. Briefly taken over by the government of East Germany in the 1950s, the factory was returned to the Moravian Church-owned Abraham Dürninger Company, which continues to make the stars in Herrnhut. Other star-making companies and groups have sprung up since then. Some Moravian congregations have congregation members who build and sell the stars as fund raisers.

== Cultural and religious importance ==
The star was soon adopted throughout the Moravian Church as an Advent symbol.

Moravian stars continue to be displayed during Advent, Christmas, and Epiphany throughout the world, even in areas without a significant Moravian Church presence. Many Moravian households display their stars year-round. The stars are often seen in Moravian nativity and Christmas village displays as a representation of the Star of Bethlehem pointing towards the infant Jesus. They are properly displayed from the first Sunday in Advent (the fourth Sunday before Christmas) until the Festival of Epiphany (January 6). Large advent stars shine in the dome of the Frauenkirche in Dresden and over the altar of the Thomaskirche in Leipzig. A 9.5-meter or 31-foot Moravian star, one of the largest in the world, sits atop the North Tower of Atrium Health Wake Forest Baptist during the Advent and Christmas seasons. The city of Winston-Salem, North Carolina, which traces its origins to Salem with Moravian origins dating to 1766, uses the Moravian star as their official Christmas street decoration. Another star sits under Wake Forest University's Wait Chapel during the Advent and Christmas seasons as well.

The use of the stars during the Advent, Christmas, and Epiphany seasons is also a tradition in the West Indies, Greenland, Suriname, Labrador, Central America, South and East Africa, Ladakh in India, and in parts of Scandinavia, wherever the Moravian Church has sent missionaries.

In 2020, as the world descended into the Covid-19 pandemic, Moravians began to ring and rehang their stars as a sign of love, hope and peace during dark times. On March 27, 2020 Atrium Health Wake Forest Baptist reinstalled their 31-foot star, atop the North Tower.

== Types of stars ==
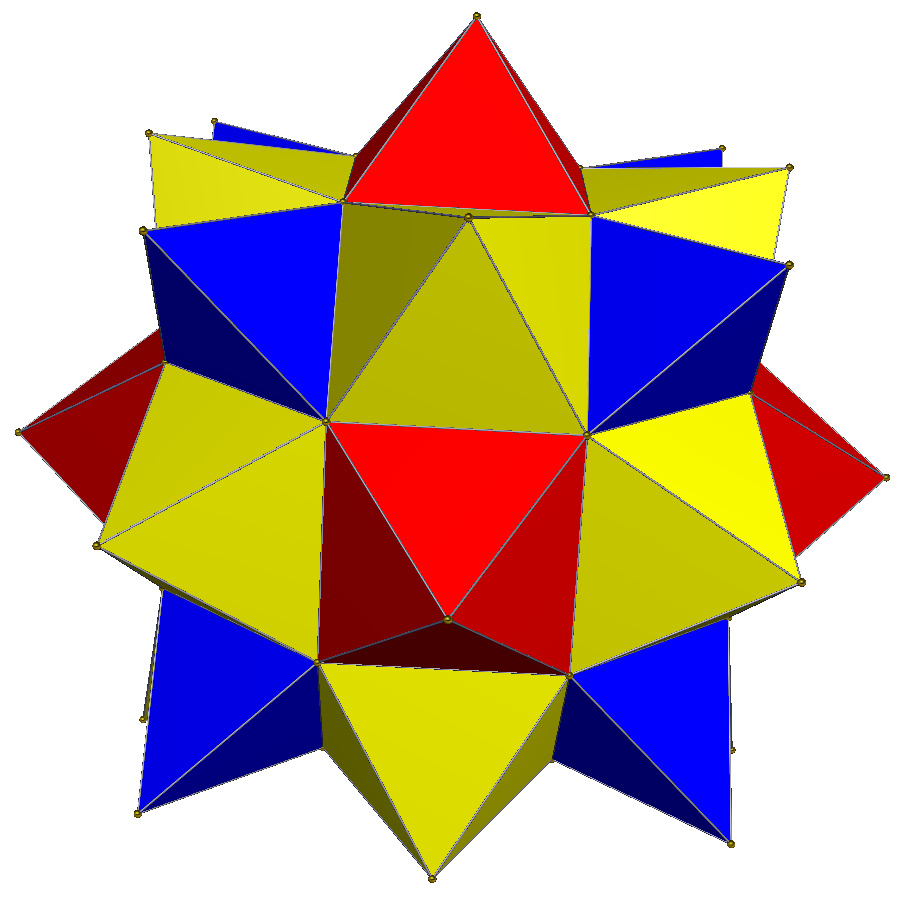
Kleetope of a rhombicuboctahedron (26 points)

The original Moravian star as manufactured in Herrnhut since 1897 exists only in a 26-point form, composed of eighteen square and eight triangular cone-shaped points. The 26th point is missing and used for mounting. This shape is technically known as a Kleetope of a rhombicuboctahedron. Each face of the geometric solid in the middle, the rhombicuboctahedron, serves as the base for one of the pyramid augmentations or starburst points. This is the most commonly seen and most widely available form of Christmas star.

Other forms of Christmas star exist, which differ from the original Herrnhut Moravian star. No matter how many points a star has, it has a symmetrical shape based on polyhedra. There are other stars with 20, 32, 50, 62 and 110 points that are commonly hand-made. The variety comes from various ways of forming the polyhedron that provides a base for the points—using an octagonal face instead of a square face, for example. The common original Herrnhut Moravian star becomes a 50-point star when the squares and triangles that normally make up the faces of the polyhedron become octagons and hexagons. This leaves a 4-sided trapezoidal hole in the corners of the faces which is then filled with an irregular four sided point. These 4-sided points form a "starburst" in the midst of an otherwise regular 26-point star.

Froebel stars, which are paper decorations made from four folded strips of paper, are sometimes inaccurately also called Moravian stars, among many other names.

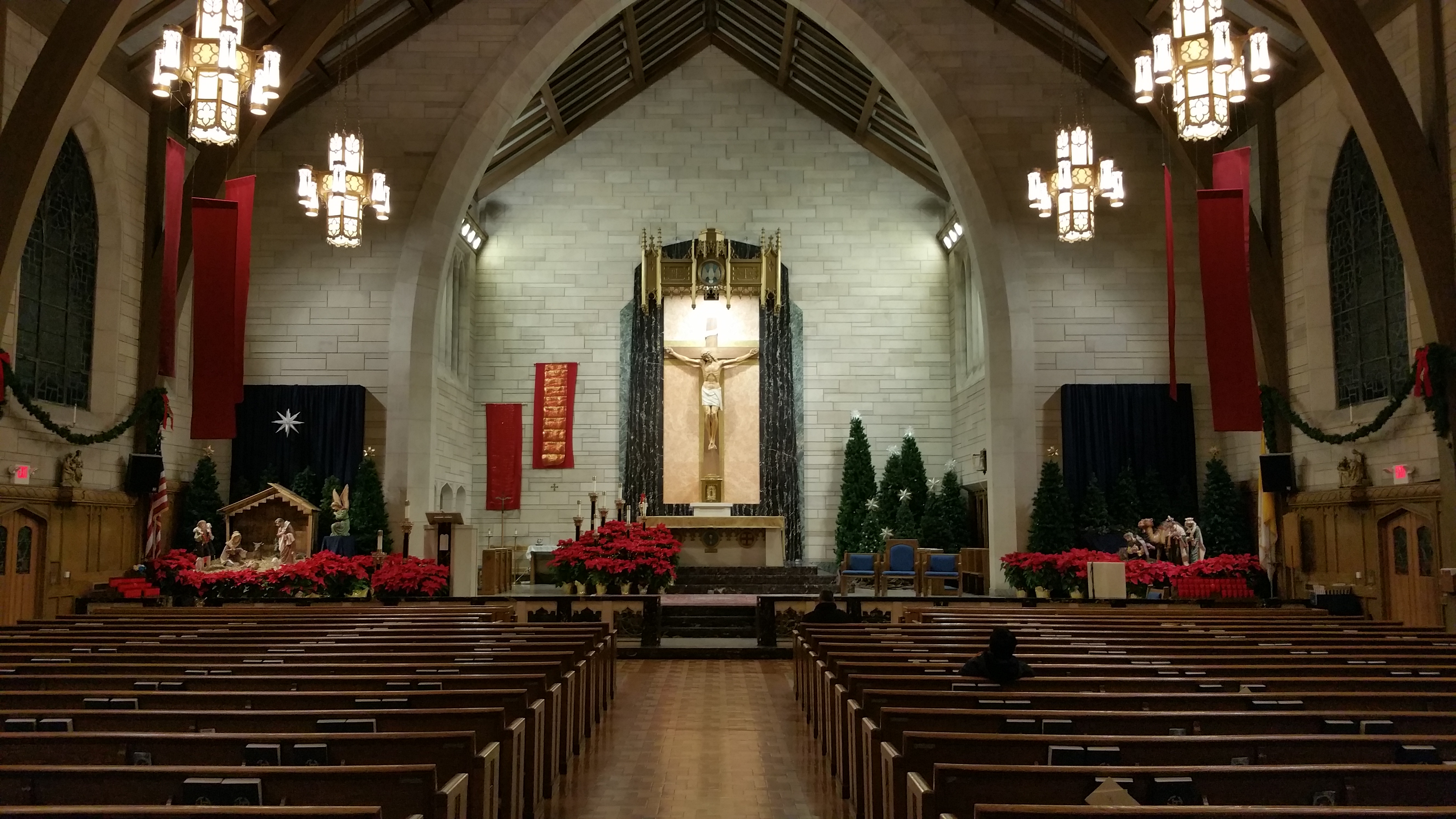
A Moravian star hangs above a Nativity scene in the sanctuary of St. Paul Roman Catholic Church (on left).

== See also ==
- Christingle
- Illumination (decoration)
- Lovefeast
- Nativity scene
