= 1901 in Nordic music =

The following is a list of notable events that occurred in the year 1901 in Nordic music.

== Events ==
- 4 October – Carl Nielsen's String Quartet No. 3 receives its public première in the lesser hall of the Odd Fellows Mansion, Copenhagen.

== New works ==
- Hugo Alfvén – Skärgårdsbilder
- Hakon Børresen – String Sextet opus 5 in G major
- Edvard Grieg – Lyric Pieces, Book X
- Ludvig Holm – Praeludium for organ
- Jean Sibelius – Ten Pieces, Op. 24

== Popular music ==
- Sigrid Sköldberg-Pettersson and Emmy Köhler – "Raska fötter springa tripp, tripp, tripp", published in Julklappen

== Births ==
- 4 January – Kari Aarvold Glaser, Norwegian pianist and music teacher (died 1972)
- 17 March – Margit Rosengren, Swedish operetta singer (died 1952)
- 14 June – Kjell Roikjer, Danish bassoonist and composer (died 1999)
- 16 August – Olav Kielland, Norwegian conductor and composer (died 1985)
- 8 October – Eivind Groven, Norwegian composer and music theorist (died 1977)

== Deaths ==
- 2 March – Albert Rubenson, Swedish violinist and composer (born 1826)
- 11 April – Ivar Hallström, Swedish opera composer (born 1826)
- 24 August – Gunnar Wennerberg, Swedish poet, politician and composer (born 1817)

== See also ==
- 1901 in Denmark
- 1901 in Norwegian music
- 1901 in Sweden
