= Knut's party =

Mid-January Christmas tradition in Sweden

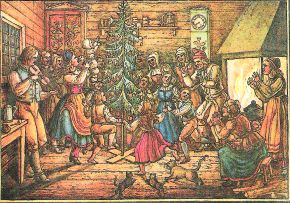
- Knut's dance or Dancing out Christmas, by Swedish artist Hugo Hamilton (1802–1871)
- Official name: julgransplundring
- Observed by: Sweden
- Celebrations: Dancing around the Christmas tree, children's party, removing Christmas decorations
- Date: 13 January
- Next time: 13 January 2027
- Frequency: annual
- Related to: Christmas, St. Knut's Day

A Knut's party or Knut's dance (Swedish: julgransplundring, literally: "Christmas tree plundering") is a tradition in Sweden on Saint Knut's Day (13 January), which marks the end of the Christmas and holiday season, which includes Advent Sunday, Saint Lucy's Day, Christmas, New Year and Epiphany. It is also known as "Dancing out Christmas" (dansa ut julen) or "Throw out the Tree" (kasta ut granen).

== Origin ==
Traditionally since the 17th century, Christmas ends on the 20th day after Christmas in Sweden. The feast held in connection to this was originally in celebration of the Danish duke Canute Lavard. During the Middle Ages the celebration shifted to the martyred King Canute IV of Denmark, patron saint of Denmark and Knutsgillen ("Knut's guilds"), a form of Medieval trading companies. The guilds sometimes organized balls and the Swedish word for the gatherings, gille, may have influenced the tradition of the feasting since it also means "party".

It is mentioned in the Old Farmer's Almanac that "King Knut asked them for help to drive out Christmas". In the old Swedish agrarian society, children would run from farm to farm to "call out Christmas" (ropa ut julen), that is call out that Christmas had ended and beg for food and drink.

The present day tradition has changed very little since the 1870s. During the 20th century, the Knut's party became mainly associated with children and candy. The observance of the feast peaked during 1950–70.

== Party ==
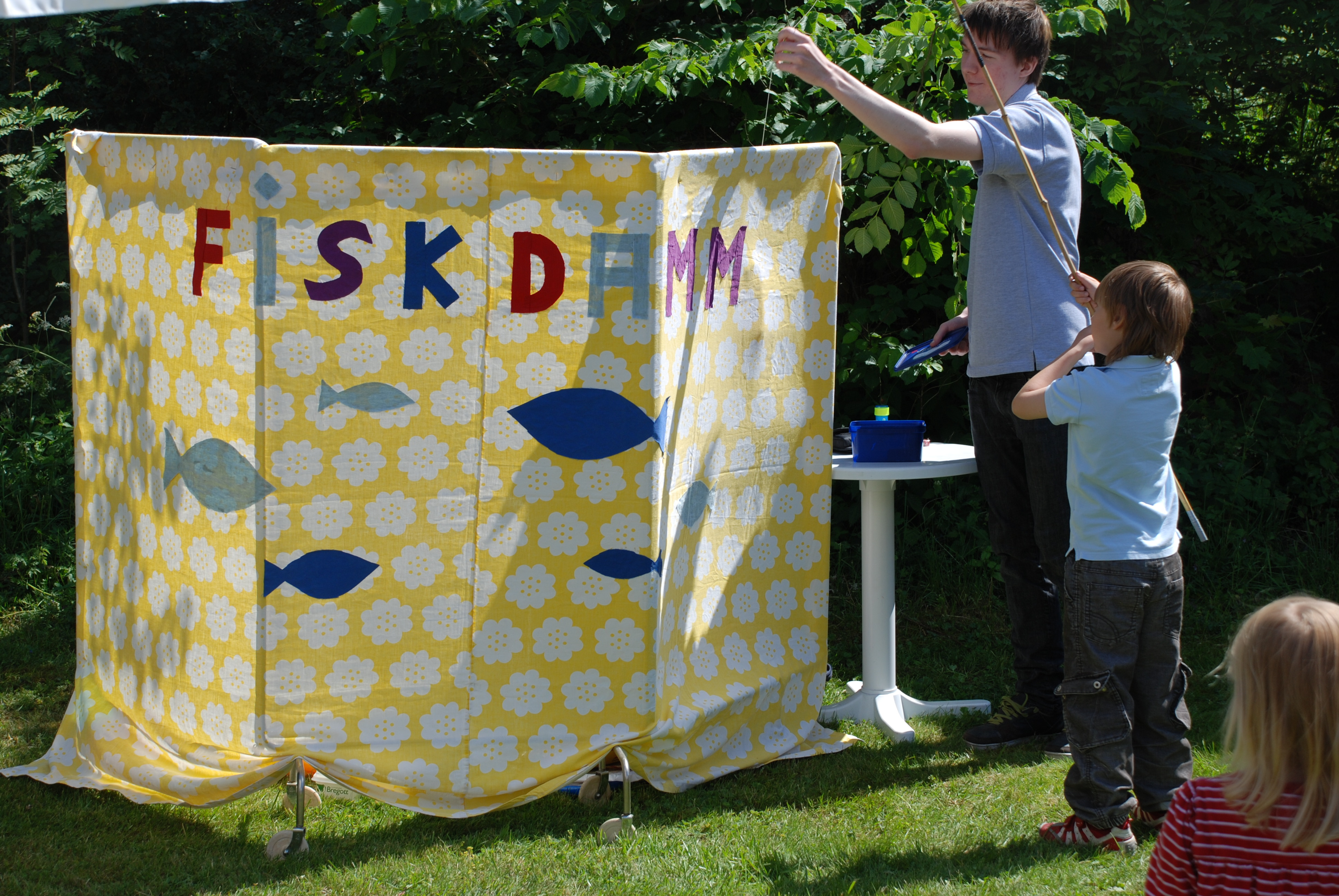
A Swedish "fishing pond" for children is used on many occasions, here on Midsummer's eve.

In private homes, there is often a party mainly for children. The Christmas decorations are then put aside. Such parties are also common in schools, kindergartens, churches and other places. In many towns, the illumination of the public Christmas tree is switched off, accompanied by an outdoor Knut's dance for the community. In some areas the feast is known as Julgransskakning ("Shaking the Christmas tree").

Party activities involve singing and dancing around the Christmas tree, "looting" the tree of ornamental candy and apples, smashing the gingerbread house into pieces and eating it, opening Christmas crackers that have been used as decorations in the tree, lotteries, creating a fiskdamm ("fishing pond") where children will "fish" for toys and candy or a treasure hunt. The songs and dances are essentially the same as those performed at Christmas and Midsummer, and some songs with verses about the end of Christmas, such as Raska fötter springa tripp, tripp, tripp, may especially emphasize such verses.

== "Throwing out" the tree ==
During the 20th century, Christmas trees were literally thrown out of the window or from the balcony, onto the street once they had been "plundered" and stripped of all ornaments. Since the beginning of the 21st century, areas for dumping the trees are designated by local authorities but in 2015, spontaneous and illegal dumping grounds were still a problem. Volunteers from sport clubs and other organizations such as Lions Clubs International also help collect the discarded trees. These can be recycled for heating or used in bonfires at Walpurgis Night (Valborgsmässoafton) later in spring. Failure to dispose of the tree in a manner designated by the authorities can result in a fine or a sentence of up to one year in prison.

Since the late 1980s, artificial Christmas trees have replaced a portion of the natural trees and thus eliminated the need to dispose of the tree. These are simply disassembled and put into storage after the Knut's party.

A number of trees are as of 2012 disposed around Twelfth Night, almost a week before St. Knut's Day.

== References in popular culture ==
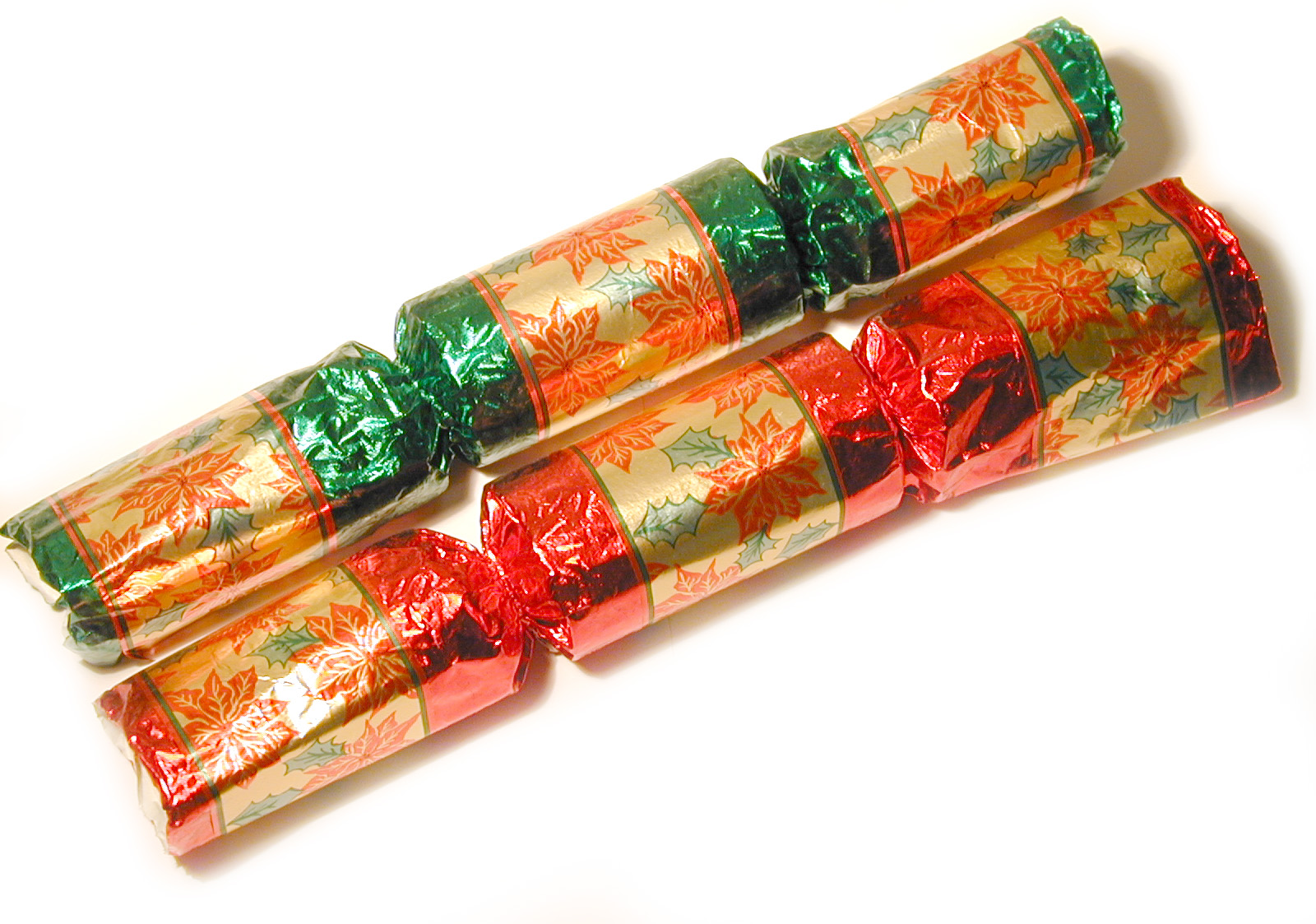
Christmas crackers are common during Knut's parties.

- Astrid Lindgren has depicted traditional Swedish Knut's parties in her books, such as Pippi Longstocking's After-Christmas Party, (1979).
- In the 1984 Gunilla Bergström book Klaga lagom, Alfons Åberg (later called Lycklige Alfons Åberg), no traditional Knut's dance is carried out. Instead, the Christmas tree is thrown down from the balcony of the flat into the January snow: a modern variation for children in urbanized 20th century Sweden.
- The final verse of the 1901 Christmas song Raska fötter springa tripp, tripp, tripp, written by Sigrid Sköldberg-Pettersson and Emmy Köhler, describes the Christmas tree being carried out (julegranen bäres ut); a Knut's party may specially emphasize the final verse.
