= Herr Mannelig =

Swedish folk ballad

Herr Mannelig (also known as Bergatrollets frieri "The Courting of the Mountain Troll") is a Swedish folk ballad (SMB 26; TSB A 59) that tells the story of a female mountain troll (bergatroll) who proposes marriage to a young human man. The troll is trying to convince "Sir Mannelig" (Herr Mannelig) to marry her. She offers him many gifts but he refuses her because she is not a Christian. It is also implied that the troll is actually a pagan woman, and that the song symbolizes a young Christian man resisting material gain that would come with apostasy.

== History ==
The ballad was first published in 1877 as a folk song of the Södermanland region (recorded in Lunda parish, Nyköping Municipality). A variant from Näshulta parish, Eskilstuna Municipality, published in the same collection in 1882, had the title Skogsjungfruns frieri ("The Courting of the Wood-nymph", a skogsjungfru or skogsnufva being a female wood-nymph or fairy). Other variants have been recorded in which the courted man is called "Herr Magnus" (Herr Magnus och Hafstrollet, Hertig Magnus och Hafsfrun, a hafstroll or hafsfru being a water-nymph, neck or mermaid). Certain variants appear to identify the ballad's protagonist as Magnus, Duke of Östergötland, incorporating an alleged incident in which the duke, old and mentally impaired, threw himself into the water after seeing such a water spirit waving to him. Hertig Magnus och sjöjungfrun ("Duke Magnus and the Mermaid") is an 1862 operetta by Ivar Hallström (libretto by Frans Hedberg).

The lyrics of the ballad published in 1877 are in seven verses, with a refrain in the troll's voice (Herr Mannelig trolofven I mig, "Sir Mannelig will you be betrothed to me?"). The first verse gives an exposition, saying of the troll "she had a false tongue" (Hon hade en falskeliger tunga), suggesting that the troll is trying to deceive the young man; this is in contrast to the Näshulta variant, which has hon sjong med så rörande tunga ("she sang with touching [emotionally affecting] tongue", which may or may not imply deception). Verses 2–5 are in the troll's voice, promising gifts of twelve steeds, twelve mills, a gilded sword and a silken shirt, respectively; verse 6 is in the man's voice, rejecting the proposal, calling the troll "of the tribe of the neck and the devil" (af Neckens och djävulens stämma, while in the Näshulta he declines because he swore not to marry a heathen). The final verse has the troll running away wailing ("Had I got the handsome young man / I would have avoided my torment" Hade jag fått den fager ungersven / Så hade jag mistat min plåga). The Näshulta variant is closely related, but has an additional five verses listing promised gifts, the list of promises being (verses 2–10): a castle, twelve horses, a stable, twelve mills, a gilded sword, a silken shirt, a cap of red damask, a blue mantle, and finally treasure of gold and diamonds.

The theme is of the "Fairies' Hope for Christian Salvation" type (no. 5050) in the classification of Christansen (1958); the same theme was notably adapted by Hans Christian Andersen in The Little Mermaid (Den Lille Havfrue, 1837), influenced by Friedrich de la Motte Fouqué's Undine of 1811, and ultimately based on the theory by Paracelsus that there are certain nature spirits who lack a soul and are therefore "willing to surrender their carefee lives to marry a mortal, experience human suffering, and thereby win spiritual immortality". In German folklore, the theme is expressed more typically by the water-nymph trying to draw the young man into perdition rather than trying to be saved by him (cf. Der Fischer by Goethe 1779; Loreley by Clemens Brentano 1801). The sexes are reversed in the German ballad Es freit ein wilder Wassermann, recorded 1813 in Joachimsthal, Brandenburg, where a male water spirit woos a young woman.

The song in the 1877 version has become popular in the Neofolk, Folk rock or Neo-Medieval musical genres since the late 1990s, following its inclusion in the album Guds spelemän by Garmarna in 1996. Later performances include In Extremo, Verehrt und angespien (1999), Haggard, Eppur Si Muove (2004), Heimataerde, Dark Dance (2009), Midnattsol, The Aftermath (2018), SKÁLD, Huldufólk (2023), among others.

== Lyrics ==
Swedish: 1. Bittida en morgon innan solen upprann; Innan foglarna började sjunga Bergatrollet friade till fager ungersven Hon hade en falskeliger tunga (ref.) Herr Mannelig Herr Mannelig trolofven I mig För det jag bjuder så gerna I kunnen väl svara endast ja eller nej Om I viljen eller ej: 2. Eder vill jag gifva de gångare tolf; Som gå uti rosendelunde Aldrig har det varit någon sadel uppå dem Ej heller betsel uti munnen: 3. Eder vill jag gifva de qvarnarna tolf; Som stå mellan Tillö och Ternö Stenarna de äro af rödaste gull Och hjulen silfverbeslagna: 4. Eder vill jag gifva ett förgyllande svärd; Som klingar utaf femton guldringar Och strida huru I strida vill Stridsplatsen skolen I väl vinna: 5. Eder vill jag gifva en skjorta så ny; Den bästa I lysten att slita Inte är hon sömnad av nål eller trå Men virkat av silket det hvita: 6. Sådana gåfvor jag toge väl emot; Om du vore en kristelig qvinna Men nu så är du det värsta bergatroll Af Neckens och djävulens stämma: 7. Bergatrollet ut på dörren sprang; Hon rister och jämrar sig svåra Hade jag fått den fager ungersven Så hade jag mistat min plåga	English: 1. Early one morning before the sun rose up; Before the birds began to sing The mountain troll proposed to the handsome young man She had a false tongue (ref.) Herr Mannelig, herr Mannelig, will you be betrothed to me? For that, I offer you gifts very gladly Surely you can answer only yes or no If you wish to or not: 2. To you I wish to give the twelve horses [palfreys]; That go in the grove of roses Never has there been a saddle upon them Nor a bridle in their mouths: 3. To you I wish to give the twelve mills; That are between Tillö and Ternö The stones are made of the reddest gold And the wheels are covered in silver: 4. To you I wish to give a gilded sword; That chimes of fifteen gold rings And fight however you fight [well or badly] The battle site you would surely win: 5. To you I wish to give a shirt so new; The best you will want to wear It was not sewn with needle or thread But worked of white silk: 6. Such gifts I would surely accept; If thou wert a Christian woman However, thou art the worst mountain troll The kin of the Neck and the Devil: 7. The mountain troll ran out the door; She shakes and wails hard If I had got the handsome young man I would have got rid of my plight.

== See also ==
- Nordic folk music
- Melusine
- Palästinalied
- "Herr Magnus og Bjærgtrolden"
