= Mountain troll =

A mountain troll (bergatroll) is a type of troll in Scandinavian folklore.

Mountain troll may also refer to:

- Troll (Harry Potter), in the Harry Potter book series by J. K. Rowling
- Troll (Middle-earth), in J. R. R. Tolkien's Middle-earth writings

== See also ==
- Bergatrollets frieri (Swedish folk ballad)
