= Duke of Dalsland =

Duke of Dalsland or Duke of Dalia is a Swedish substantive title.

The following rulers have held Dalsland as duke:

- Prince Eric, Duke of Dalsland 1310–1318 (also of Södermanland, West Gothland, Värmland and North Halland)
- Prince Magnus, Duke of Dalsland 1560–1595 (also of East Gothland)
