= Sköldberg =

Sköldberg is a Swedish surname. Notable people with the surname include:

- Per Olof Sköldberg (1910–1979), Swedish sport shooter
- Sigrid Sköldberg-Pettersson (1870–1941), Swedish song lyricist
