= Hertig Magnus och Hafsfrun =

Medieval Swedish/Nordic ballad

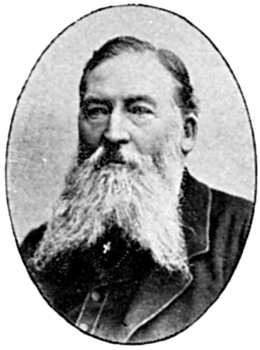
Ivar Christian Hallström

Hertig Magnus och Hafsfrun (Sir Magnus and the Mermaid) is a medieval Swedish and Nordic ballad and an 1867 operetta with libretto by Frans Hedberg and music by Ivar Hallström about the insane Swedish duke Magnus of Östergötland.

== Background ==
The operetta takes place in Vadstena during Erik XIV's reign, and is about how local fishermen try to exploit the insane Swedish Duke Magnus, who lives in Vadstena castle, by making him fall in love with a fisherman's daughter who he believes is a mermaid. The model of the plot is a historically unsettled event, when the real Magnus was said to have seen a mermaid outside his window and fallen into the moat. The event led to Magnus being introduced as the protagonist of medieval ballads and songs about alluring sea creatures.

== See also ==
- Herr Mannelig
- Magnus, Duke of Östergötland
