= Saint Knut's Day =

Scandinavian holiday

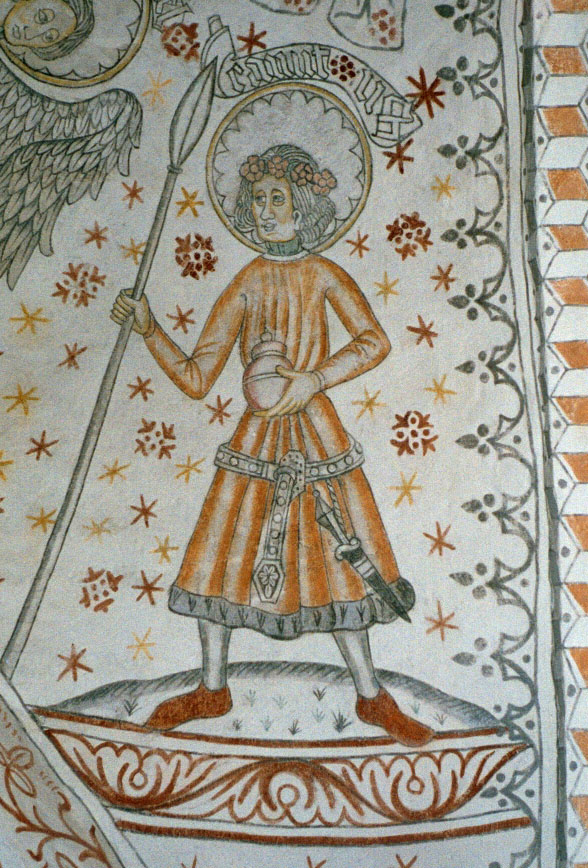
- Canute Lavard
- Also called: tjugondag jul, tjugondag Knut, knutmasso
- Observed by: Sweden, Finland, Estonia
- Date: 13 January
- Frequency: annual

Saint Knut's Day (Swedish: tjugondag jul, lit. 'twentieth-day Christmas'; tjugondag Knut, lit. 'twentieth-day Knut'; or knutmasso; Finnish: nuutinpäivä, lit. 'Knut's Day'), or the Feast of Saint Knut, is a traditional festival celebrated in Sweden and Finland on 13 January. It is not celebrated on this date in Denmark despite being named for the Danish prince Canute Lavard, and later also associated with his uncle, Canute the Saint, the patron saint of Denmark. Christmas trees are taken down on tjugondag jul, and the candies and cookies that decorated the tree are eaten. In Sweden, the feast held during this event is called a Knut's party (julgransplundring, literally 'Christmas tree plundering').

== Origins ==
Canute Lavard (Knut Levard in Swedish) was a Danish duke who was assassinated by his cousin and rival Magnus Nielsen on 7 January 1131 over the Danish throne. In the aftermath of his death there was a civil war, which led to Knut being later declared a saint, and 7 January became Knut's Day, a name day.

As his name day roughly coincided with Epiphany (the "thirteenth day of Christmas"), Knut's Day and Epiphany were conflated to some degree. In 1680, Knut's Day was moved to 13 January and became known as tjugondag Knut or tjugondedag jul (the 'twentieth day of Knut/Christmas').

== Finland ==
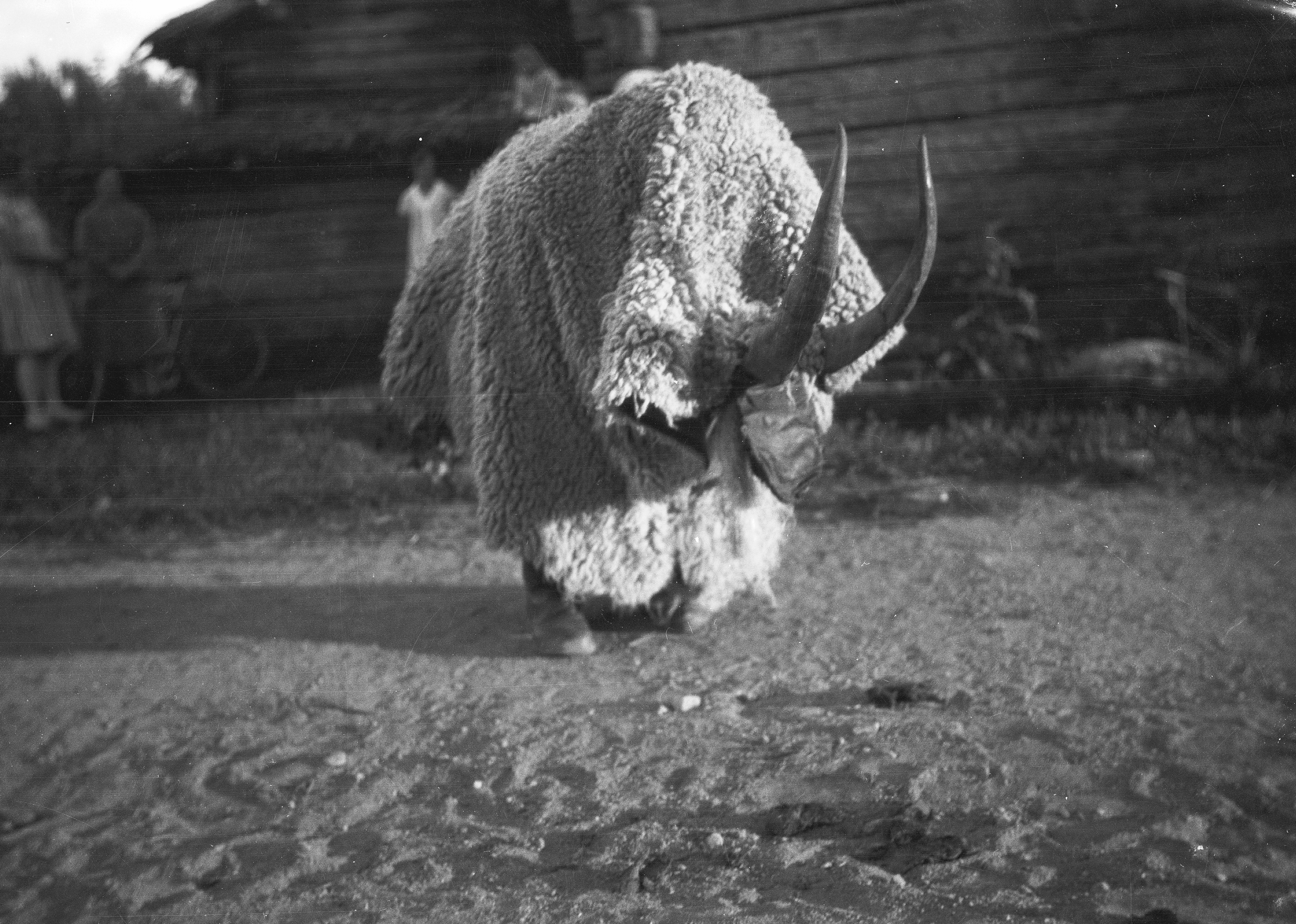
Man dressed as nuuttipukki from 1928

On nuutinpäivä, a tradition has been observed which is somewhat analogous to the modern Santa Claus, where young men dressed as goats (Finnish: nuuttipukki) would visit houses. Usually the dress was an inverted fur jacket, a leather or birch bark mask, horns, sometimes with a sauna whisk as a tail. Unlike Santa Claus, Nuuttipukki was a scary character (cf. Krampus). The men dressed as nuuttipukki wandered from house to house, came in, and typically demanded food from the household and especially leftover alcoholic beverages. Unless Nuuttipukki received a salary from the host, he committed evil deeds. A dialectical proverb from Noormarkku says: Hyvä Tuomas joulun tua, paha Knuuti poijes viä or 'Good [St.] Thomas brings Christmas, evil Knut takes [it] away.'

In Finland, the Nuuttipukki tradition is still kept alive in areas of Satakunta, Southwest Finland, Ostrobothnia and very much so on the Åland Islands. However, nowadays the character is usually played by children and now involves a happy encounter.

== Sweden ==
In Sweden, Saint Knut's Day marks the end of the Christmas and holiday season. It is celebrated by taking out the Christmas tree and dancing around it. Nowadays, the feast is mainly for children.

== Estonia ==
In Estonia, the holiday was adopted from Finland to give a formal end to the Christmas season.
