= Christmas and holiday season =

Christmas and surrounding holiday period

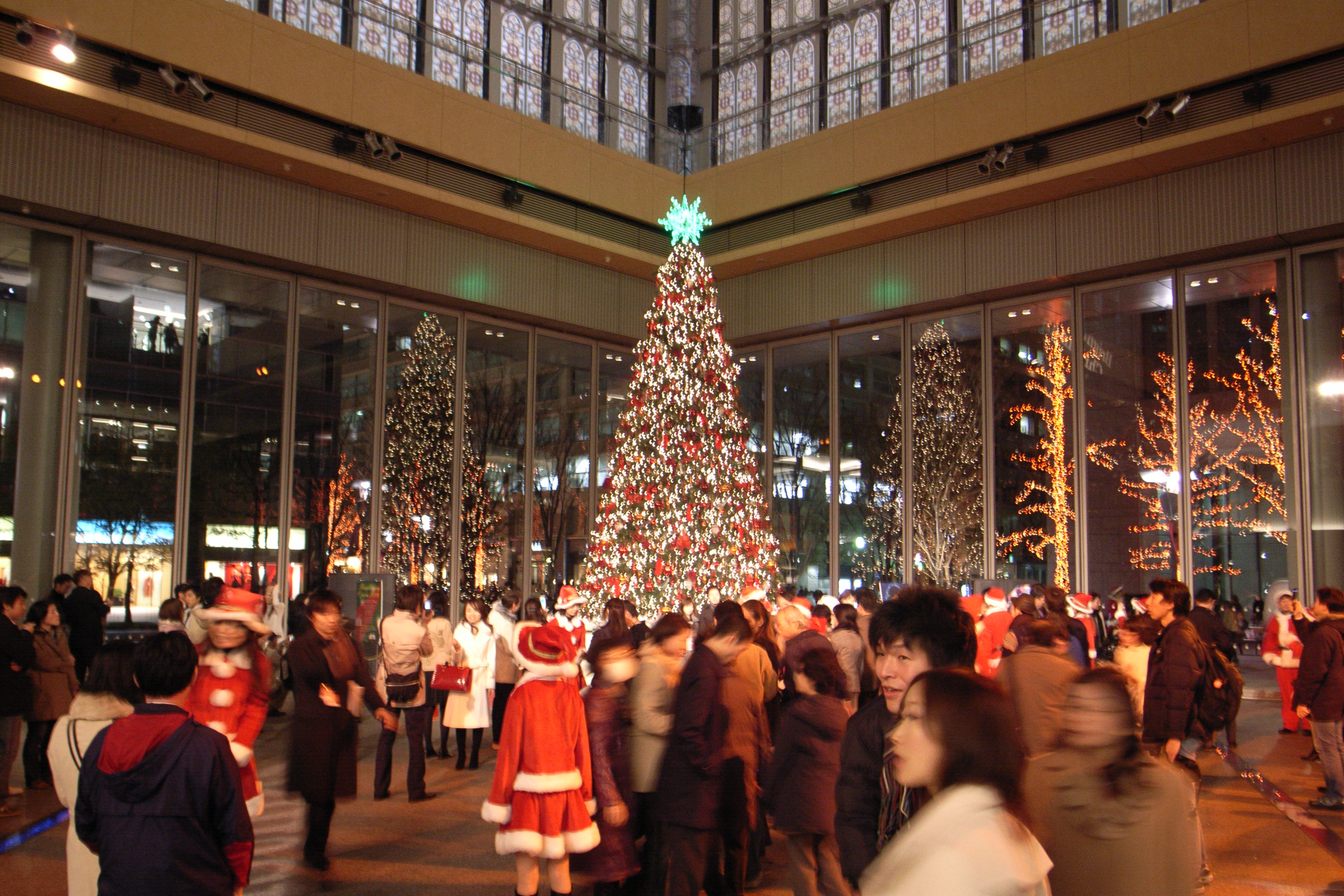
- Christmas tree in Japan. Christmas is celebrated by an increasing number of non-Christians around the world.
- Also called: Christmas season; Christmastime; Holiday season; The holidays; Festive season; Winter holidays (Northern Hemisphere); Summer holidays (Southern Hemisphere); Yuletide; New Year's holidays
- Significance: Christian and secular festive season
- Observances: Gift giving; family gatherings; religious services; parties; other holiday-specific traditions
- Begins: Varies, generally late November or early December
- Ends: Varies (generally January 1 (New Year's Day) or January 6 (Epiphany)
- Related to: Advent; Christmas (Eve); Boxing Day; New Year's Day (Eve); Twelfth Night; Thanksgiving (US); Hanukkah; Yule; Epiphany; Kwanzaa (US); Winter solstice; others

The Christmas season or the festive season, also known as the holiday season or the holidays, is an annual period generally spanning from November or December to early January incorporating Christmas Day and New Year's Day. The gift-giving associated with the season creates a peak season for the retail sector extending to the end of the period. Christmas window displays and Christmas tree lighting ceremonies are customary traditions in various locales.

In Western Christianity, the Christmas season is traditionally synonymous with Christmastide, which runs from December 25 (Christmas Day) to January 5 (Twelfth Night or Epiphany Eve), popularly known as the 12 Days of Christmas. Christmas in Italy is one of the country's major holidays and begins on 8 December, with the Feast of the Immaculate Conception, the day on which traditionally the Christmas tree is mounted and ends on 5 January with Twelfth Night (with the following day commencing Epiphanytide). Christmas is celebrated on December 25 Christmas Day, while the Christmas season extends beyond the holiday itself, commonly continuing through New Year’s Day and concluding on January 6 with the celebration of Epiphany. As the economic impact involving the anticipatory lead-up to Christmas Day grew in America and Europe into the 19th and 20th centuries, the term "Christmas season" began to also encompass the liturgical Advent season, the period of preparation observed in Western Christianity from the fourth Sunday before Christmas Day until the night of Christmas Eve. The term "Advent calendar" continues to be widely known in Western parlance as a term referring to a countdown to Christmas Day from the beginning of December.

Beginning in the mid-20th century, as the Christian-associated Christmas holiday and liturgical season, in some circles, became increasingly commercialized and central to American economics and culture while religio-multicultural sensitivity rose, generic references to the season that omitted the word "Christmas" became more common in the corporate and public sphere of the United States, which has caused a semantics controversy. By the late 20th century, the Jewish holiday of Hanukkah and the new African American cultural holiday of Kwanzaa began to be considered in the U.S. as being part of the "holiday season", a term that as of 2013 had become equally or more prevalent than "Christmas season" in U.S. sources to refer to the end-of-the-year festive period. "Holiday season" has also spread in varying degrees to Canada; however, in the United Kingdom and Ireland, the phrase "holiday season" is not widely understood to be synonymous with the Christmas–New Year period, and is often instead associated with summer holidays.

== History ==
=== Winter solstice ===
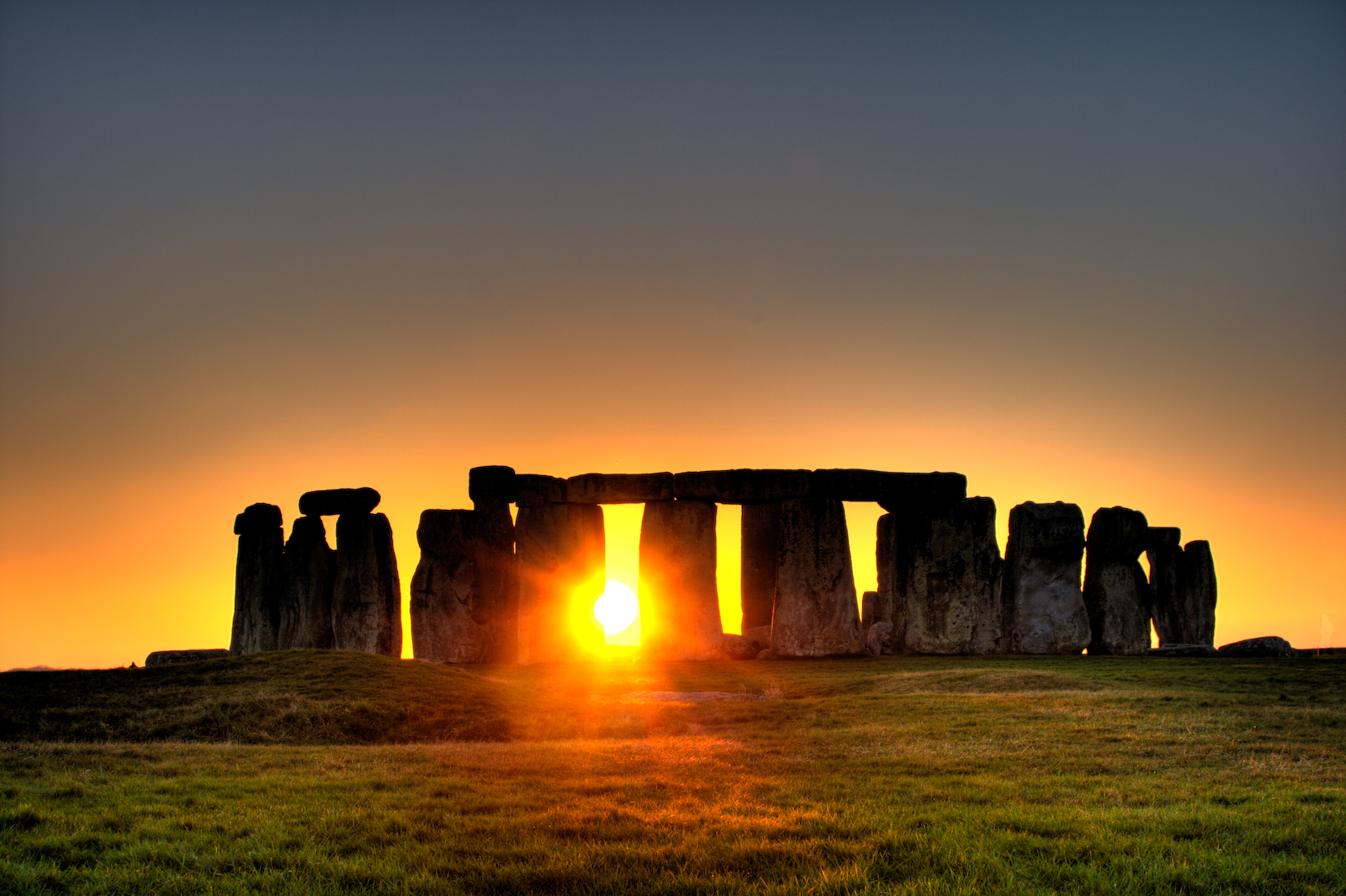
Midwinter sunset at Stonehenge

The winter solstice (in the Northern Hemisphere occurring in late December) may have been a special moment of the annual cycle for some cultures even during Neolithic times. This is attested by physical remains in the layouts of late Neolithic and Bronze Age archaeological sites, such as Stonehenge in England and Newgrange in Ireland. The primary axes of both of these monuments seem to have been carefully aligned on a sight-line pointing to the winter solstice sunrise (Newgrange) and the winter solstice sunset (Stonehenge). It is significant that the Great Trilithon was oriented outwards from the middle of the monument, i.e. its smooth flat face was turned towards the midwinter Sun.

=== Roman Saturnalia ===
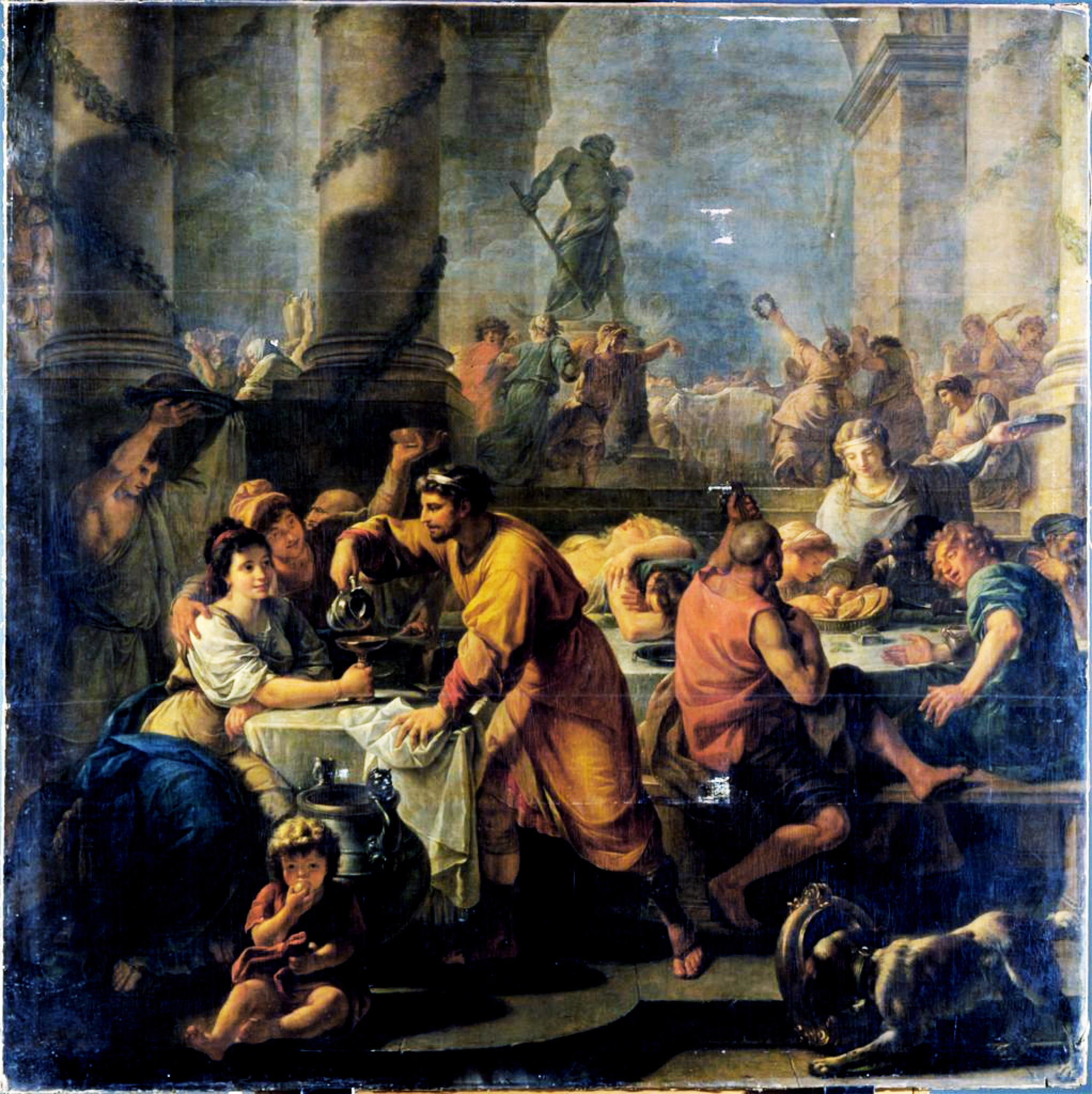
Saturnalia (1783) by Antoine-François Callet, showing his interpretation of what the Roman Saturnalia might have looked like

Saturnalia was an ancient Roman festival in honor of the deity Saturn, the god of time, held on December 17 of the Julian calendar and later expanded with festivities through December 23. The holiday was celebrated with a sacrifice at the Temple of Saturn, in the Roman Forum, and a public banquet, followed by private gift-giving, continual partying, and a carnival atmosphere that overturned Roman social norms: gambling was permitted, and masters provided table service for their slaves. In addition to being a religious celebration, Saturnalia served as a social leveler by temporarily suspending established hierarchies and reversing roles. Because the affluent and the poor could participate in the same celebrations without the customary social barriers, the festival promoted a sense of community delight. The poet Catullus called it "the best of days."

=== Feast of the Nativity: Christmas ===
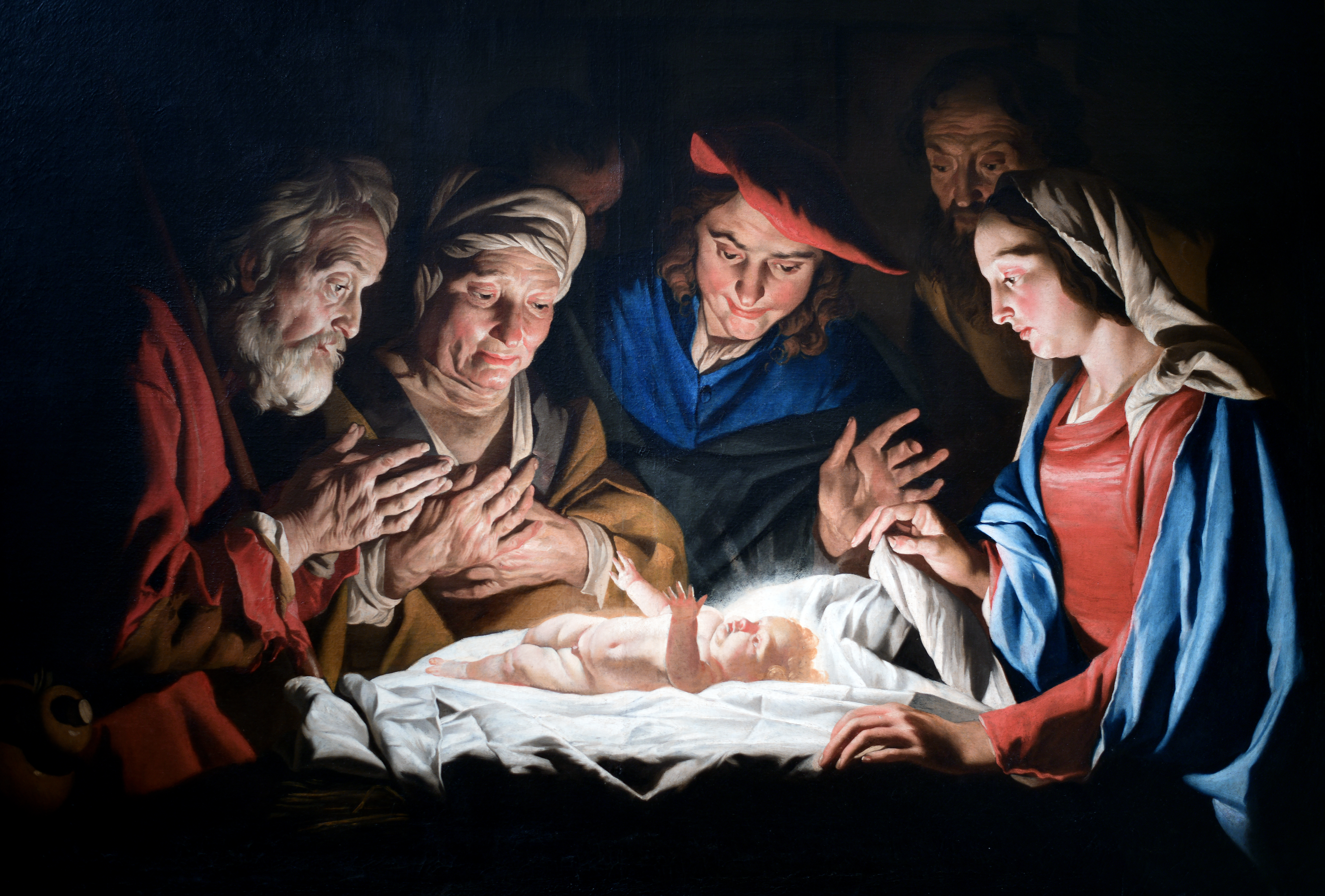
Adoration of the Shepherds by Dutch painter Matthias Stomer, 1632

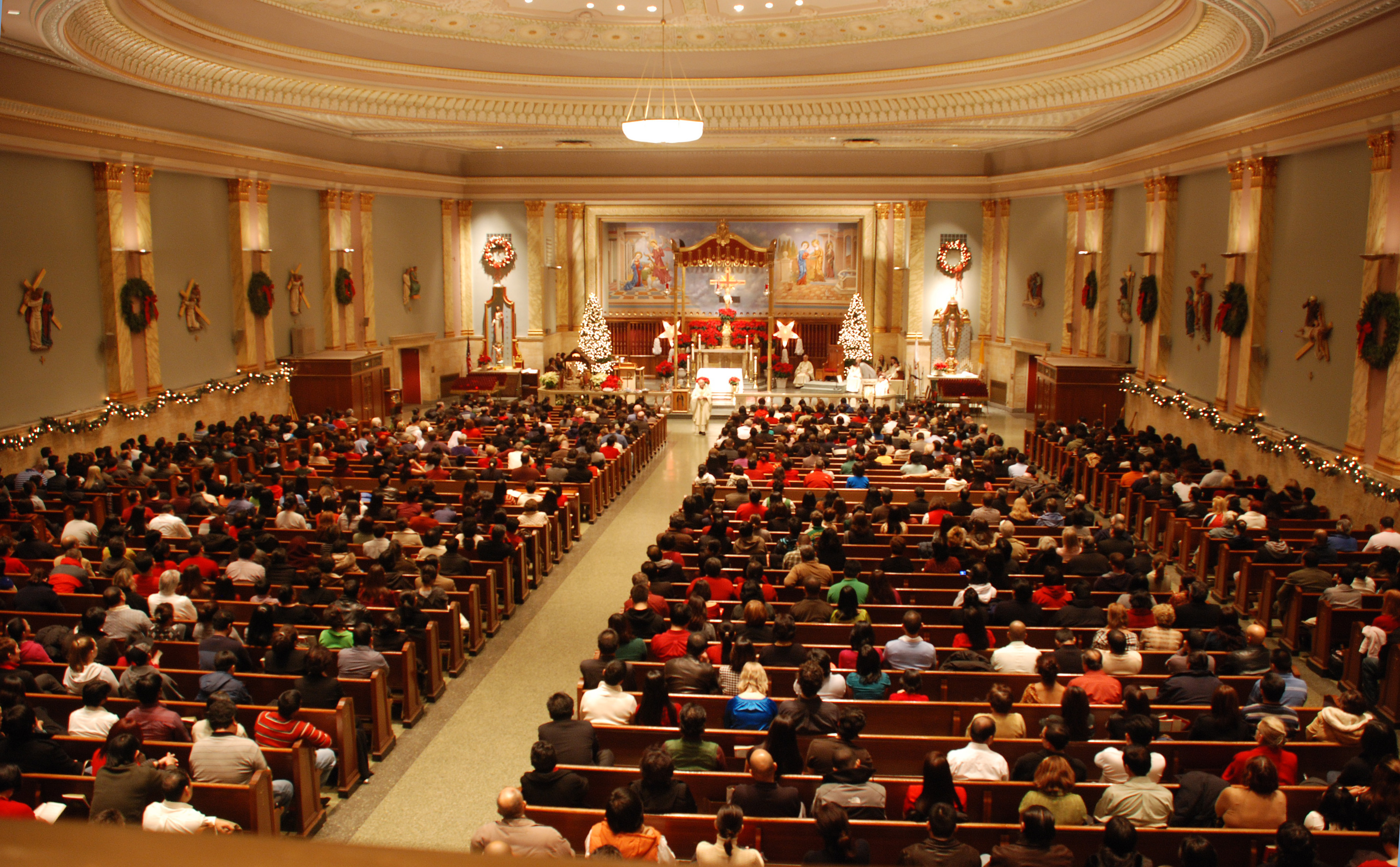
Midnight Mass at St. Sebastian Roman Catholic Church, New York City

The earliest source stating December 25 as the date of birth of Jesus was Hippolytus of Rome (170–236), written very early in the 3rd century, based on the assumption that the conception of Jesus took place at the Spring equinox which he placed on March 25, to which he then added nine months. There is historical evidence that by the middle of the 4th century, the Christian churches of the East celebrated the birth and the Baptism of the Lord on the same day, on January 8, while those in the West celebrated a Nativity feast on December 25 (perhaps influenced by the Winter solstice); and that by the last quarter of the 4th century, the calendars of both churches included both feasts. The earliest suggestions of a feast of the Baptism of Jesus on January 6 during the 2nd century comes from Clement of Alexandria, but there is no further mention of such a feast until 361, when Emperor Julian attended a feast on January 6 that year.

In the Christian tradition, the Christmas season is a period beginning on Christmas Day (December 25). In some churches (e.g., the Lutheran churches and the Anglican Communion), the season continues through Twelfth Night, the day before the Epiphany, which is celebrated either on January 6 or on the Sunday between January 2 and 8. In other churches (e.g., the Catholic Church), it continues until the Feast of the Baptism of the Lord, which falls on the Sunday following the Epiphany, or on the Monday following the Epiphany if the Epiphany is moved to January 7 or 8. If the Epiphany is kept on January 6, the Church of England's use of the term Christmas season corresponds to the Twelve Days of Christmas (December 25 through January 5), and ends on Twelfth Night (Epiphany Eve).

This Christmas season is preceded by Advent, which begins on the fourth Sunday before Christmas Day, coinciding with the majority of the commercialized Christmas and holiday season. The Anglican Communion follows the Christmas season with an Epiphany season lasting until Candlemas (February 2), which is traditionally the 40th day of the Christmas–Epiphany season; meanwhile, in the Lutheran churches and the Methodist churches, Epiphanytide lasts until the first day of Lent, Ash Wednesday.

=== Commercialisation and broadened scope ===
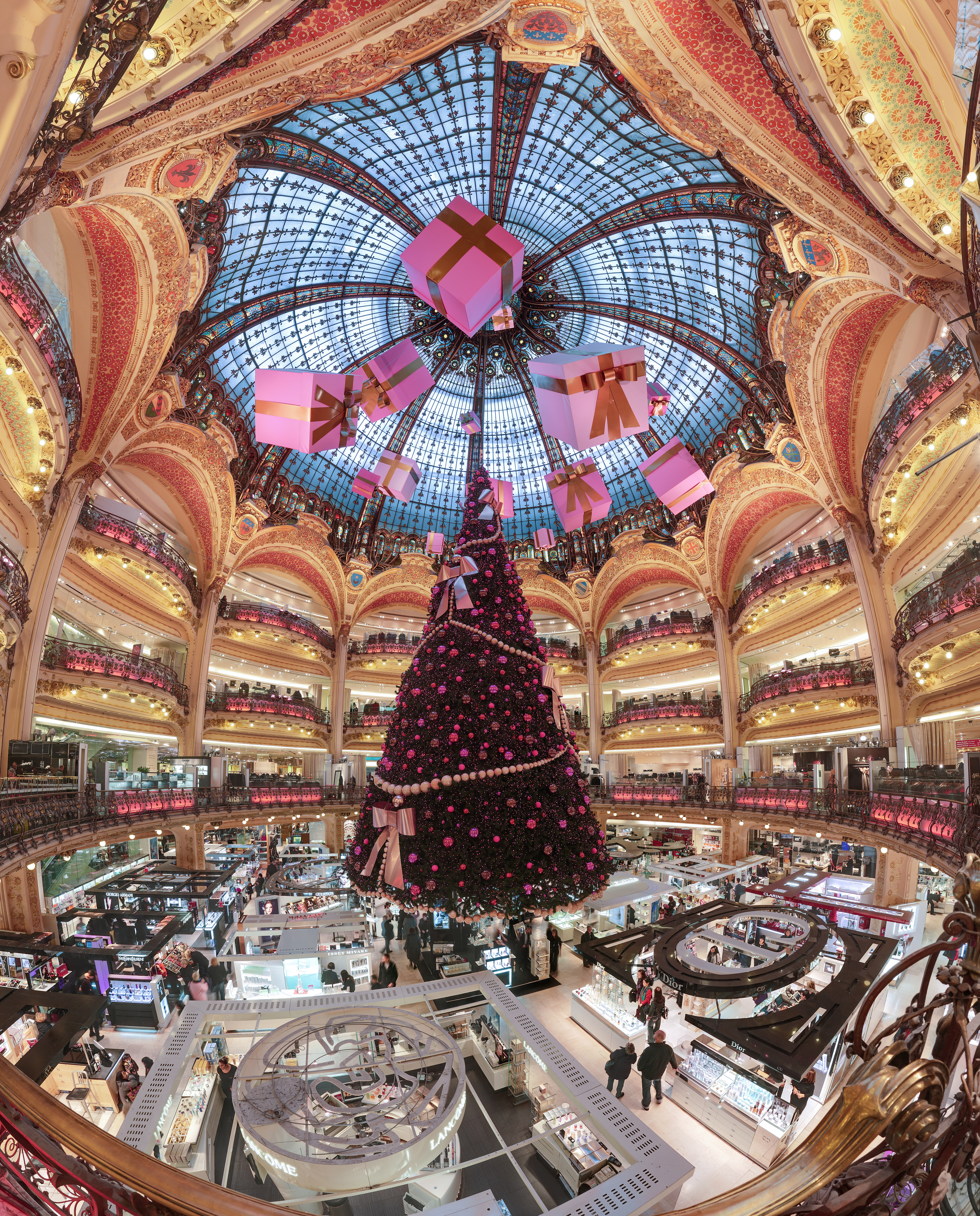
Christmas decorations at the Galeries Lafayette department store in Paris, France. The Christmas season is the busiest trading period for retailers.

The Pew Research Center found that as of 2014, 72% of Americans support the presence of Christian Christmas decorations, such as the nativity scene, on government property; of that 72%, "survey data finds that a plurality (44%) of Americans say Christian symbols, such as nativity scenes, should be allowed on government property even if they are not accompanied by symbols from other faiths." Six in ten Americans attend church services during Christmastime, and "among those who don't attend church at Christmastime, a majority (57%) say they would likely attend if someone they knew invited them."

In the United States, the holiday season "is generally considered to begin with the day after Halloween and end after New Year's Day". According to Axelrad, the season in the United States encompasses at least Christmas and New Year's Day, and also includes Saint Nicholas Day. The U.S. Fire Administration defines the "winter holiday season" as the period from December 1 to January 7. According to Chen et al., in China, the Christmas and holiday season "is generally considered to begin with the winter solstice and end after the Lantern Festival". In some stores and shopping malls, Christmas merchandise is advertised beginning after Halloween or even earlier in late October, alongside Halloween items. In the UK and Ireland, Christmas food generally appears on supermarket shelves as early as September or even August, while the Christmas shopping season itself starts from mid-November, when the high street Christmas lights are switched on.

Secular icons and symbols, such as Santa Claus, the Nutcracker, Jack Frost, Rudolph the Red-Nosed Reindeer and Frosty the Snowman, are on display in addition to Christian displays of the nativity. Public holiday celebrations and observances similarly range from midnight mass to Christmas tree lighting ceremonies, Santa Claus parades, festive lights, sleigh ridings, church services, decorations, ornaments, traditions, festivals, outdoor markets, feasts, social gatherings and the singing of carols.

The precise definition of feasts and festival days that are encompassed by the Christmas and holiday season has become controversial in the United States over recent decades. While in other countries the only holidays included in the "season" are Christmas Eve, Christmas Day, St. Stephen's Day/Boxing Day, New Year's Eve, New Year's Day and Epiphany, in recent times, this term in the U.S. began to expand to include Yule, Hanukkah, Kwanzaa, Thanksgiving, Black Friday and Cyber Monday. The expansion of the holiday season in the U.S. to encompass Thanksgiving is believed to have begun in the 1920s, when in major department stores Macy's and Gimbels launched competing Thanksgiving Day parades to promote Christmas sales. Due to the phenomenon of Christmas creep and the informal inclusion of Thanksgiving, the Christmas and holiday season has begun to extend earlier into the year, overlapping Veterans/Remembrance/Armistice Day, Halloween and Guy Fawkes Night.

== Greetings ==
A selection of goodwill greetings are often used around the world to address strangers, family, colleagues or friends during the season. Some greetings are more prevalent than others, depending on culture and location. Traditionally, the predominant greetings of the season have been "Merry Christmas", "Happy Christmas", and "Happy New Year". In the mid-to-late 20th century in the United States, more generic greetings such as "Happy Holidays" and "Season's Greetings" began to rise in cultural prominence, and this would later spread to other Western countries including Canada, Australia and to a lesser extent some European countries. A 2012 poll by Rasmussen Reports indicated that 68 percent of Americans prefer the use of "Merry Christmas", while 23 percent preferred "Happy Holidays". A similarly timed Canadian poll conducted by Ipsos-Reid indicated that 72 percent of Canadians preferred "Merry Christmas."

=== Merry Christmas and Happy Christmas ===
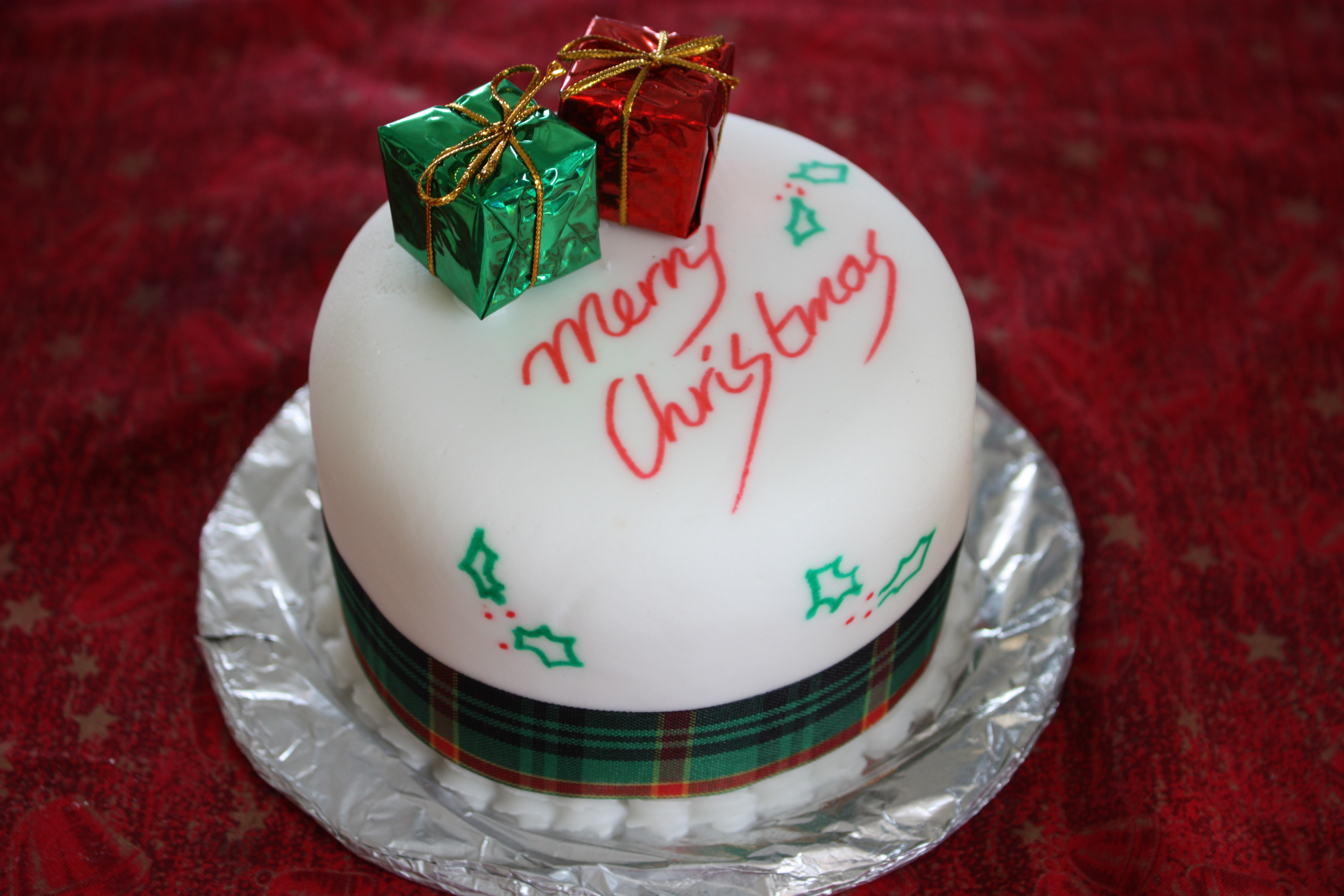
A Christmas cake with a "Merry Christmas" greeting

The greetings and farewells "Merry Christmas" and "Happy Christmas" are traditionally used in English-speaking countries, starting a few weeks before December 25 every year.

Variations are:

- "Merry Christmas", the traditional English greeting, composed of merry (jolly, happy) and Christmas (Old English: Cristes mæsse, for Christ's Mass).
- "Happy Christmas", an equivalent greeting used in Great Britain and Ireland.
- "Merry Xmas", with the "X" replacing "Christ" (see Xmas) is sometimes used in writing, but very rarely in speech. This is in line with the traditional use of the Greek letter chi (uppercase Χ, lowercase χ), the initial letter of the word Χριστός (Christ), to refer to Christ.

These greetings and their equivalents in other languages are popular not only in countries with large Christian populations, but also in the largely non-Christian nations of China and Japan, where Christmas is celebrated primarily due to cultural influences of predominantly Christian countries. They have somewhat decreased in popularity in the United States and Canada in recent decades, but polls in 2005 indicated that they remained more popular than "happy holidays" or other alternatives.

==== History of the phrase ====
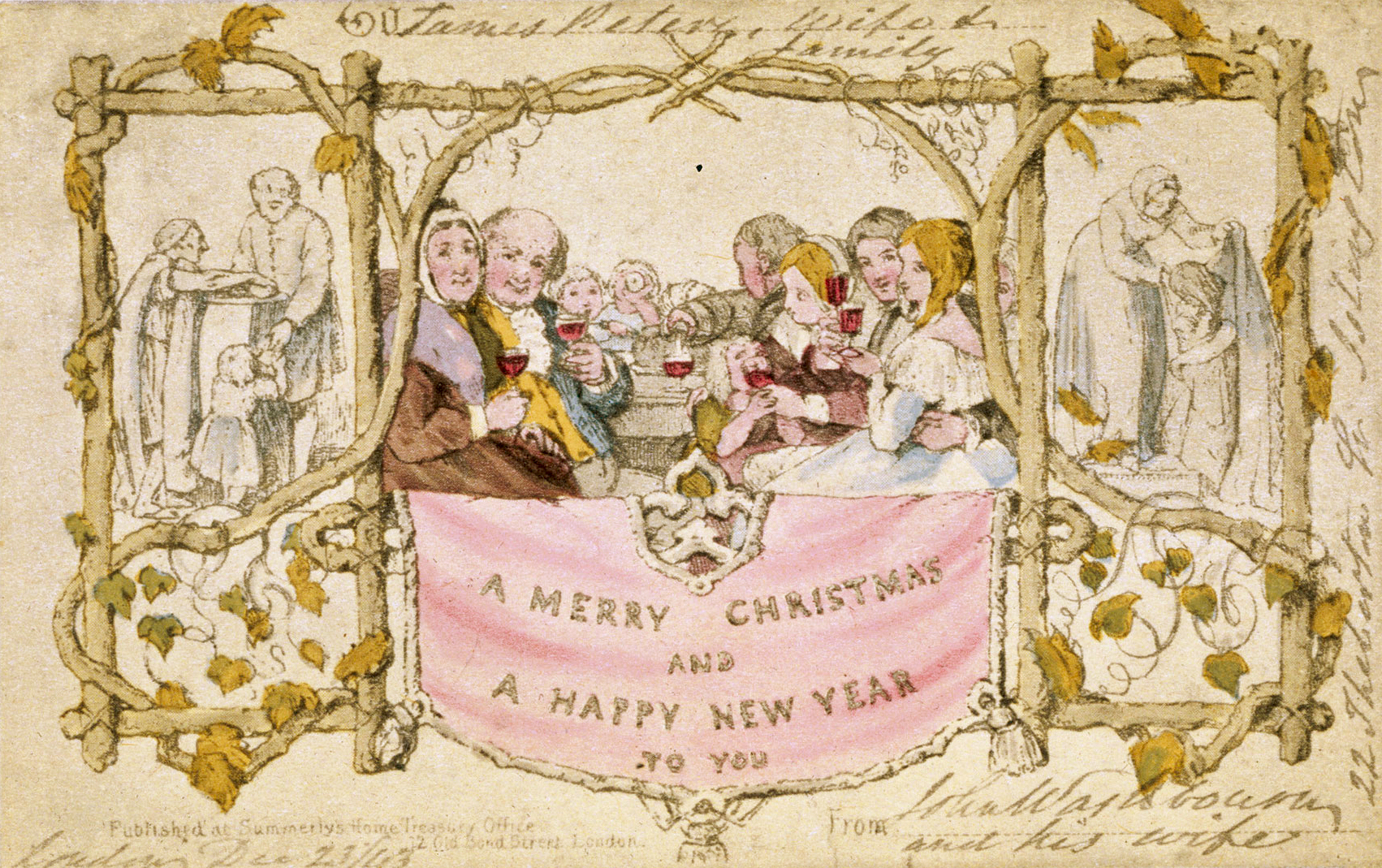
"Merry Christmas" appears on the world's first commercially produced Christmas card, designed by John Callcott Horsley for Henry Cole in 1843

"Merry," derived from the Old English myrige, originally meant merely 'pleasant, agreeable' rather than 'joyous' or 'jolly' (as in the phrase "merry month of May"). Christmas has been celebrated since at least the 4th century CE, the first known usage of any Christmas greeting was in 1534 when Bishop John Fisher, in a letter to Thomas Cromwell wrote "And this our Lord God send you a mery Christmas, and a comfortable, to your heart’s desire." "Merry Christmas and a happy new year" (thus incorporating two greetings) was in an informal letter written in 1699 by the Royal Navy officer Francis Hosier. The same phrase is contained in the title of the English carol "We Wish You a Merry Christmas," and also appears in the first commercial Christmas card, produced by Henry Cole in England in 1843.

Also in 1843, Charles Dickens' A Christmas Carol was published, during the mid Victorian revival of the holiday. The word "merry" was then beginning to take on its current meaning of "jovial, cheerful, jolly and outgoing." "Merry Christmas" in this new context figured prominently in A Christmas Carol. The cynical Ebenezer Scrooge rudely deflects the friendly greeting: "If I could work my will ... every idiot who goes about with 'merry Christmas' on his lips should be boiled with his own pudding." After the visit from the ghosts of Christmas effects his transformation, Scrooge exclaims; "I am as merry as a school-boy. A merry Christmas to everybody!" and heartily exchanges the wish to all he meets. The instant popularity of A Christmas Carol, the Victorian era Christmas traditions it typifies, and the term's new meaning appearing in the book popularized the phrase "Merry Christmas".

The alternative "Happy Christmas" gained usage in the late 19th century, and in the United Kingdom and Ireland is a common spoken greeting, along with "Merry Christmas." One reason may be the Victorian middle-class influence in attempting to separate wholesome celebration of the Christmas season from public insobriety and associated asocial behaviour, at a time when merry also meant 'intoxicated' – Queen Elizabeth II is said to have preferred "Happy Christmas" for this reason. In her annual Christmas messages to the Commonwealth, Queen Elizabeth used "Happy Christmas" far more often than "Merry Christmas." The latter was used only four times during her reign: in 1962, 1967, 1970 and 1999.

In the American poet Clement Moore's "A Visit from St. Nicholas" (1823), the final line, originally written as "Happy Christmas to all, and to all a good night", has been changed in many later editions to "Merry Christmas to all," perhaps indicating the relative popularity of the phrases in the US.

=== Happy holidays ===
In North America, "happy holidays" has, along with the similarly generalized "season's greetings", become a common seasonal expression, both spoken as a personal greeting and used in advertisements, on greeting cards, and in commercial and public spaces such as retail businesses, public schools, and government agencies. Its use is generally confined to the period between American Thanksgiving and New Year's Day. The phrase has been used as a Christmas greeting in the United States for more than 100 years.

The increasing usage of "happy holidays" has been the subject of some controversy in the United States. Advocates claim that "happy holidays" is an inclusive greeting that is not intended as an attack on Christianity or other religions, but is rather a response to what they say is the reality of a growing non-Christian population.

Opponents of the greeting generally claim it is a secular neologism intended to de-emphasize Christmas or even supplant it entirely. However Clemente Lisi, writing for Religion Unplugged, notes that the word "holiday" itself also has religious origins, being derived from "holy day", and that, "It is entirely reasonable to interpret 'Happy Holidays' not as a secular displacement of Christmas, but a seasonal greeting," pointing out that the season of Advent lasts more than a single day, and for many Christians even extends to Epiphany on January 6.

"Happy holidays" has been variously characterized by critics as politically correct, materialistic, consumerist, atheistic, indifferentist, agnostic, anti-theist, anti-Christian, or even a covert form of Christian cultural imperialism. The phrase has been associated with a larger cultural clash dubbed by some commentators as the "War on Christmas". The Rev. Barry W. Lynn, the executive director of Americans United for Separation of Church and State, has stated the uproar is based on "stories that only sometimes even contain a grain of truth and often are completely false."

=== Season's greetings ===
"Season's greetings" is a greeting more commonly used as a motto on winter season greeting cards, and in commercial advertisements, than as a spoken phrase. In addition to "Merry Christmas", Victorian Christmas cards bore a variety of salutations, including "compliments of the season" and "Christmas greetings." By the late 19th century, "with the season's greetings" or simply "the season's greetings" began appearing. By the 1920s it had been shortened to "season's greetings," and has been a greeting card fixture ever since. Several White House Christmas cards, including U.S. President Dwight D. Eisenhower's 1955 card, have featured the phrase.

== Shopping ==
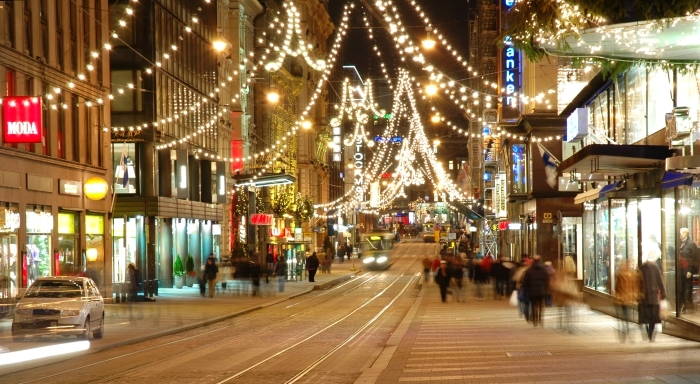
Holiday shopping in Helsinki, Finland

The exchange of gifts is central to the Christmas and holiday season, and the season thus also incorporates a "holiday shopping season". This comprises a peak time for the retail sector at the start of the holiday season (the "Christmas shopping season") and a period of sales at the end of the season, the "January sales".

Although once dedicated mostly to white sales and clearance sales, the January sales now comprise both winter close-out sales and sales comprising the redemption of gift cards given as presents. Young-Bean Song, director of analytics at the Atlas Institute in Seattle, states that it is a "myth that the holiday shopping season starts with Thanksgiving and ends with Christmas. January is a key part of the holiday season." stating that for the U.S. e-commerce sector January sales volumes matched December sales volumes in the 2004–2005 Christmas and holiday season.

Many people find this time particularly stressful. As a remedy, and as a return to what they perceive as the root of Christmas, some practice alternative giving.

=== North America ===
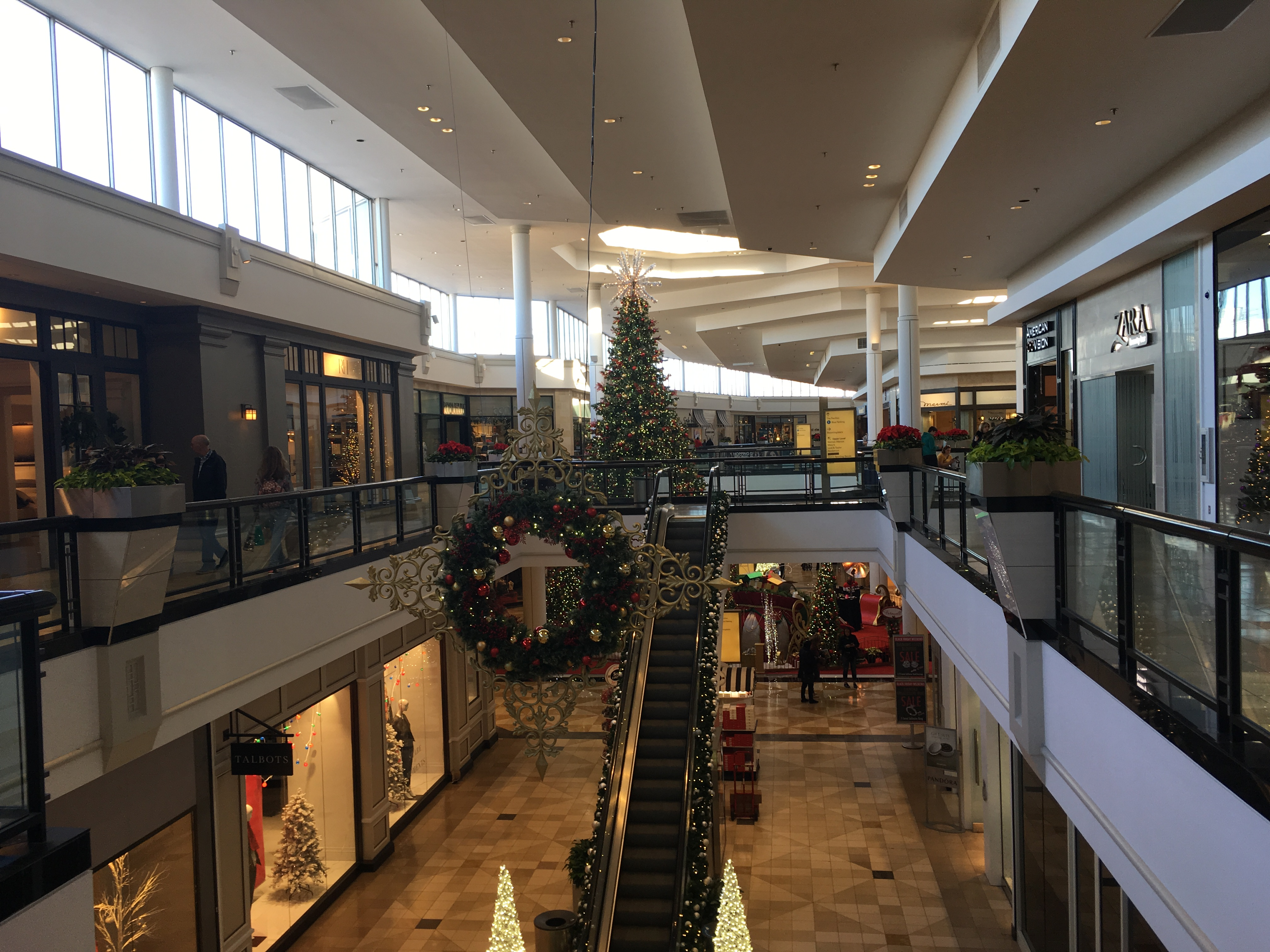
The King of Prussia Mall in King of Prussia, Pennsylvania, decorated during the Christmas season

In the United States, the holiday season is a particularly important time for retail shopping, with shoppers spending more than $600 billion during the 2013 holiday season, averaging about $767 per person. During the 2014 holiday shopping season, retail sales in the United States increased to a total of over $616 billion, and in 2015, retail sales in the United States increased to a total of over $630 billion, up from 2014's $616 billion. The average US holiday shopper spent on average $805. More than half of it was spent on family shopping.

It is traditionally considered to commence on the day after American Thanksgiving, a Friday colloquially known as either Black Friday or Green Friday. This is widely reputed to be the busiest shopping day of the entire calendar year. However, in 2004 the VISA credit card organization reported that over the previous several years VISA credit card spending had in fact been 8 to 19 percent higher on the last Saturday before Christmas Day (i.e., Super Saturday) than on Black Friday. A survey conducted in 2005 by GfK NOP discovered that "Americans aren't as drawn to Black Friday as many retailers may think", with only 17 percent of those polled saying that they will begin holiday shopping immediately after Thanksgiving, 13 percent saying that they plan to finish their shopping before November 24 and 10 percent waiting until the last day before performing their holiday gift shopping.

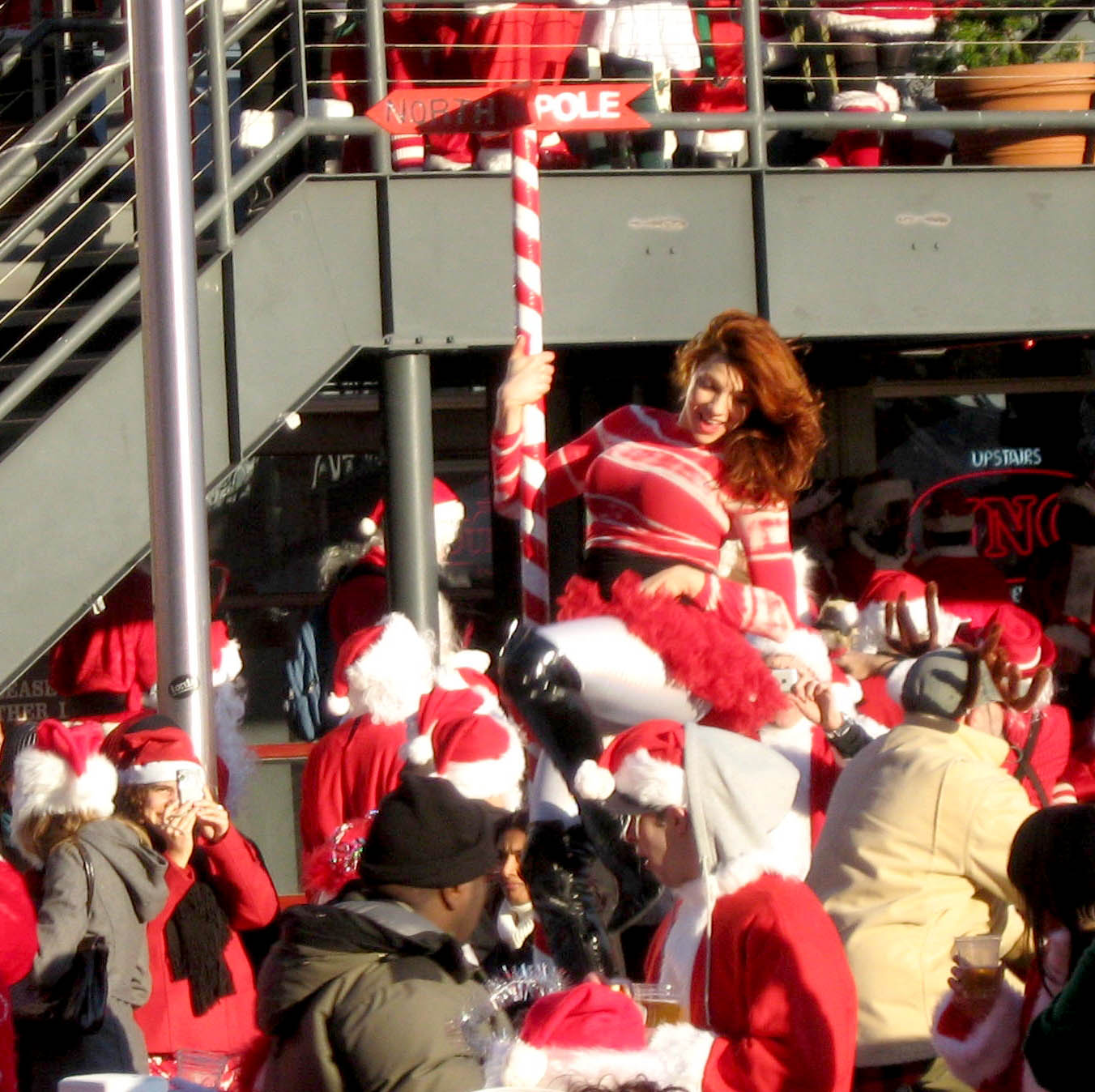
Public, secular celebration in seasonal costume

According to a survey by the Canadian Toy Association, peak sales in the toy industry occur in the Christmas and holiday season, but this peak has been occurring later and later in the season every year.

In 2005, the kick-off to the Christmas and holiday season for online shopping, the first Monday after US Thanksgiving, was named Cyber Monday. Although it was a peak, that was not the busiest online shopping day of that year. The busiest online shopping days were December 12 and 13, almost two weeks later; the second Monday in December has since become known as Green Monday. Another notable day is Free Shipping Day, a promotional day that serves as the last day in which a person can order a good online and have it arrive via standard shipping (the price of which the sender pays) prior to Christmas Eve; this day is usually on or near December 16. Four of the largest 11 online shopping days in 2005 were December 11 to 16, with an increase of 12 percent over 2004 figures. In 2011, Cyber Monday was slightly busier than Green Monday and Free Shipping Day, although all three days registered sales of over US$1 billion, and all three days registered gains ranging from 14 to 22 percent over the previous year. Analysts had predicted the peak on December 12, noting that Mondays are the most popular days for online shopping during the holiday shopping season, in contrast to the middle of the week during the rest of the year. They attribute this to people "shopping in stores and malls on the weekends, and ... extending that shopping experience when they get into work on Monday" by "looking for deals ... comparison shopping and ... finding items that were out of stock in the stores".

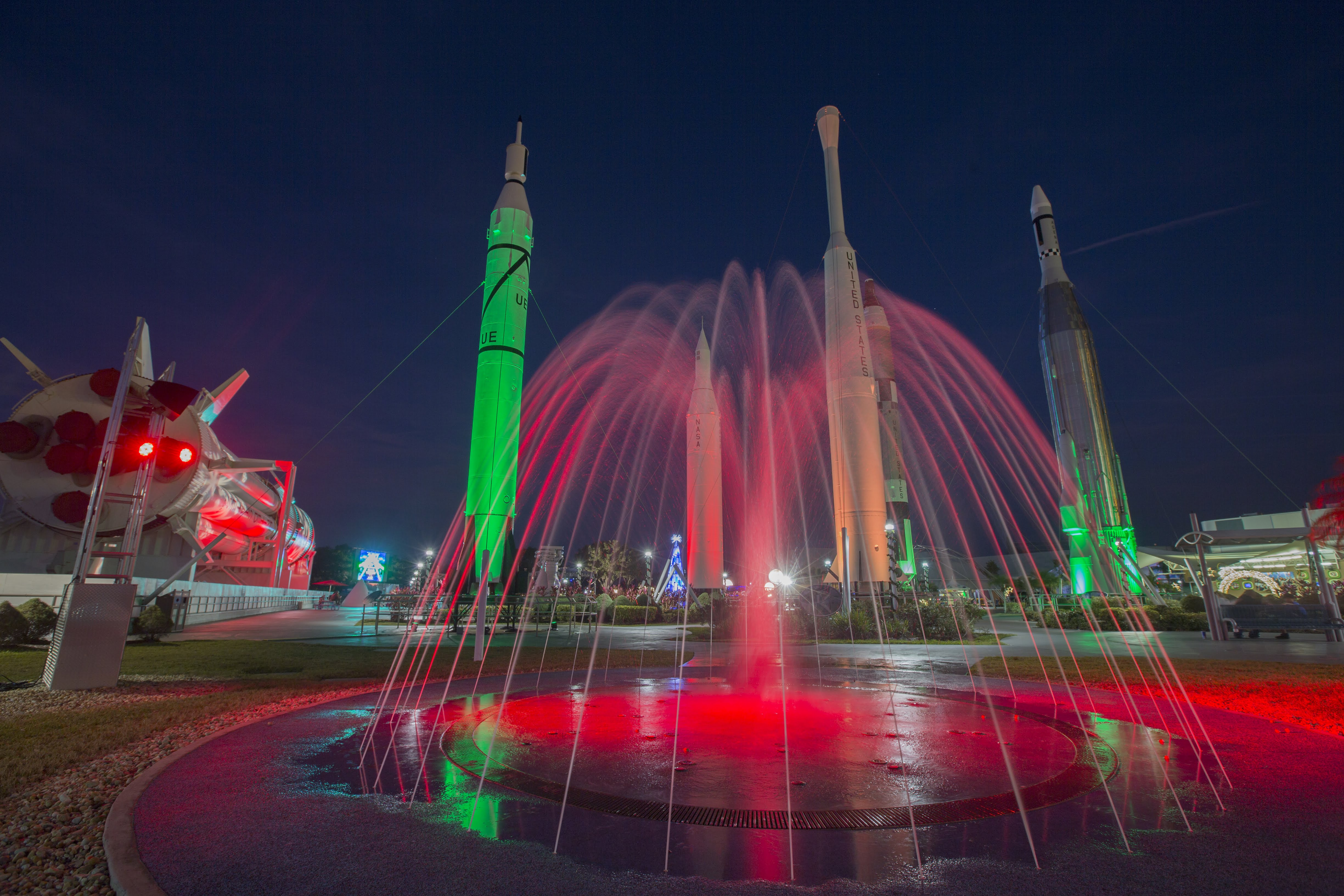
Christmas at the NASA Kennedy Space Center Visitor Complex

In 2006, the average US household was expected to spend about $1,700 on Christmas and holiday spendings. Retail strategists such as ICSC Research observed in 2005 that 15 percent of holiday expenditures were in the form of gift certificates, a percentage that was rising. So they recommended that retailers manage their inventories for the entire holiday shopping season, with a leaner inventory at the start and new winter merchandise for the January sales.

Michael P. Niemira, chief economist and director of research for the Shopping Center Council, stated that he expected gift certificate usage to be between US$30 billion and US$40 billion in the 2006–2007 holiday shopping season. On the basis of the growing popularity of gift certificates, he stated that "To get a true picture of holiday sales, one may consider measuring October, November, December and January sales combined as opposed to just November and December sales.", because with "a hefty amount of that spending not hitting the books until January, extending the length of the season makes sense".

According to the Deloitte 2007 Holiday Survey, for the fourth straight year, gift cards were expected to be the top gift purchase in 2007, with more than two-thirds (69 percent) of consumers surveyed planning to buy them, compared with 66 percent in 2006. In addition, holiday shoppers planned to buy even more cards that year: an average of 5.5 cards, compared with the 4.6 cards they planned to buy the previous year. One in six consumers (16 percent) planned to buy 10 or more cards, compared with 11 percent the previous year. Consumers also spent more in total on gift cards and more per card: $36.25 per card on average compared with $30.22 last year. Gift cards continued to grow in acceptance: Almost four in 10 consumers surveyed (39 percent) would rather get a gift card than merchandise, an increase from the previous year's 35 percent. Also, resistance to giving gift cards continued to decline: 19 percent said they would not like to give gift cards because they're too impersonal (down from 22 percent last year). Consumers said that the cards are popular gifts for adults, teens and children alike, and almost half (46 percent) intend to buy them for immediate family; however, they are hesitant to buy them for spouses or significant others, with only 14 percent saying they plan to buy them for those recipients.

Some stores in Canada hold Boxing Week sales (before the end of the year) for income tax purposes.

==== Christmas creep ====
What has become known as "Christmas creep" refers to a merchandising phenomenon in which merchants and retailers exploit the commercialized status of Christmas by moving up the start of the holiday shopping season. The term was first used in the mid-1980s, and is associated with a desire of merchants to take advantage of particularly heavy Christmas-related shopping well before Black Friday in the United States and before Halloween in Canada.

In the UK and Ireland retailers refer to the "golden quarter", that is, the three months of October through December is the quarter of the year in which the retail industry hopes to make the most profit.

=== Europe ===
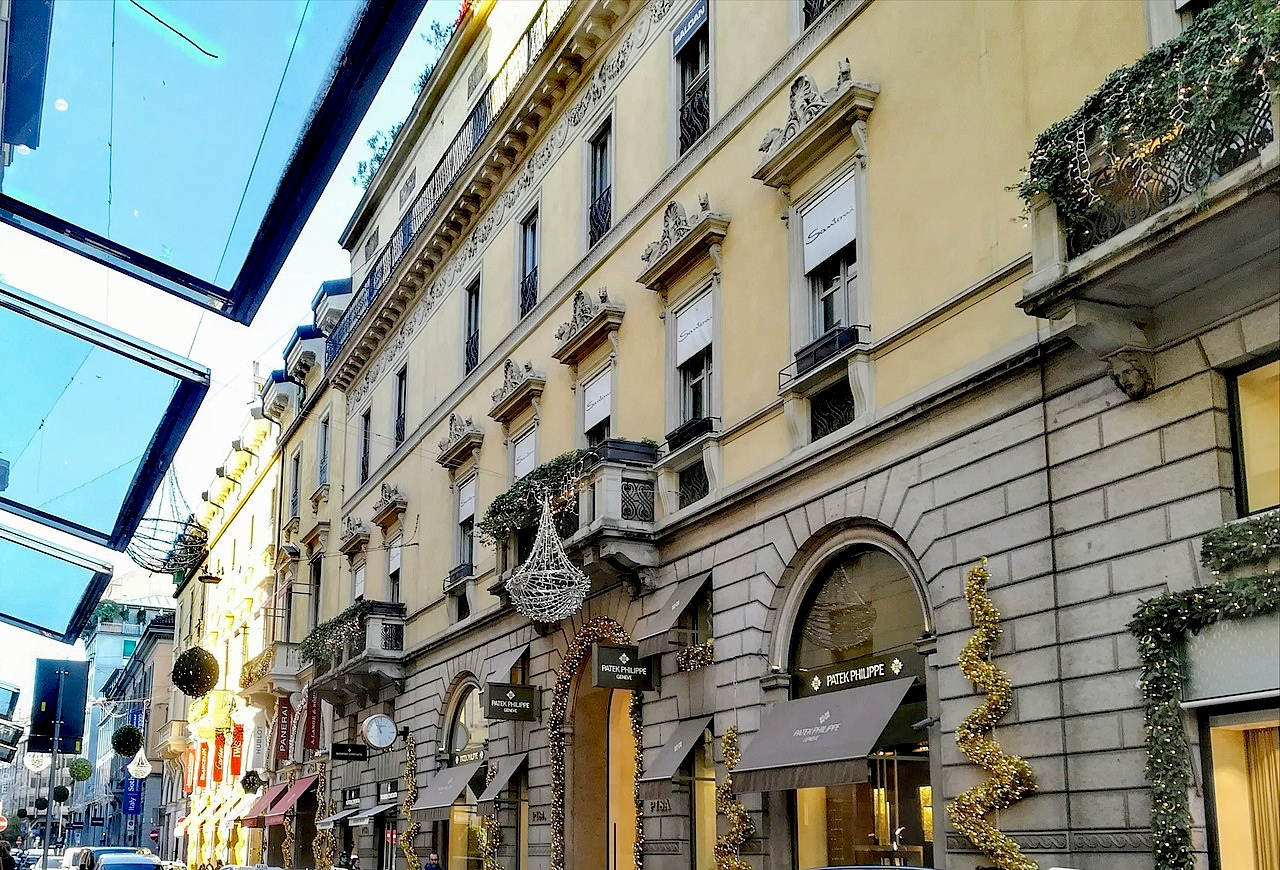
Christmas decorations and lights adorn Via Monte Napoleone, Quadrilatero della moda, Milan, Italy

In the Republic of Ireland and the United Kingdom, the Christmas (known informally as 'Chrimbo/Crimbo') shopping season starts from mid-November, around the time when high street Christmas lights are turned on. In the UK in 2010, up to £8 billion was expected to be spent online at Christmas, approximately a quarter of total retail festive sales. Retailers in the UK call Christmas the "golden quarter", that is, the three months of October to December is the quarter of the year in which the retail industry hopes to make the most money. In Ireland, around early December or late November each year, The Late Late Toy Show is broadcast on Irish television, which features all the popular toys throughout the year being demonstrated and showcased before the holiday season and shopping sprees commence.

The Netherlands and Belgium have a double holiday. The first one, the arrival of the Bishop Saint Nicholas and Black Peter, starts about mid-November, with presents being given on December 5 or 6. This is a separate holiday from Christmas, Bishop Saint Nick (Sinterklaas) and Santa Claus (Kerstman) being different people. The Netherlands and Belgium often do not start the Christmas season until December 6 or 7, i.e. after Sinterklaas has finished.

In France, the January sales are restricted by legislation to no more than four weeks in Paris, and no more than six weeks for the rest of the country, usually beginning on the first Wednesday in January, and are one of only two periods of the year when retailers are permitted to hold sales.

In Italy, the January sales begin on the first weekend in January, and last for at least six weeks.

In Croatia and Bosnia (predominantly Sarajevo) the sales periods are regulated by the Consumer Protection Act. The January sales period starts on December 27 and can last up to 60 days.

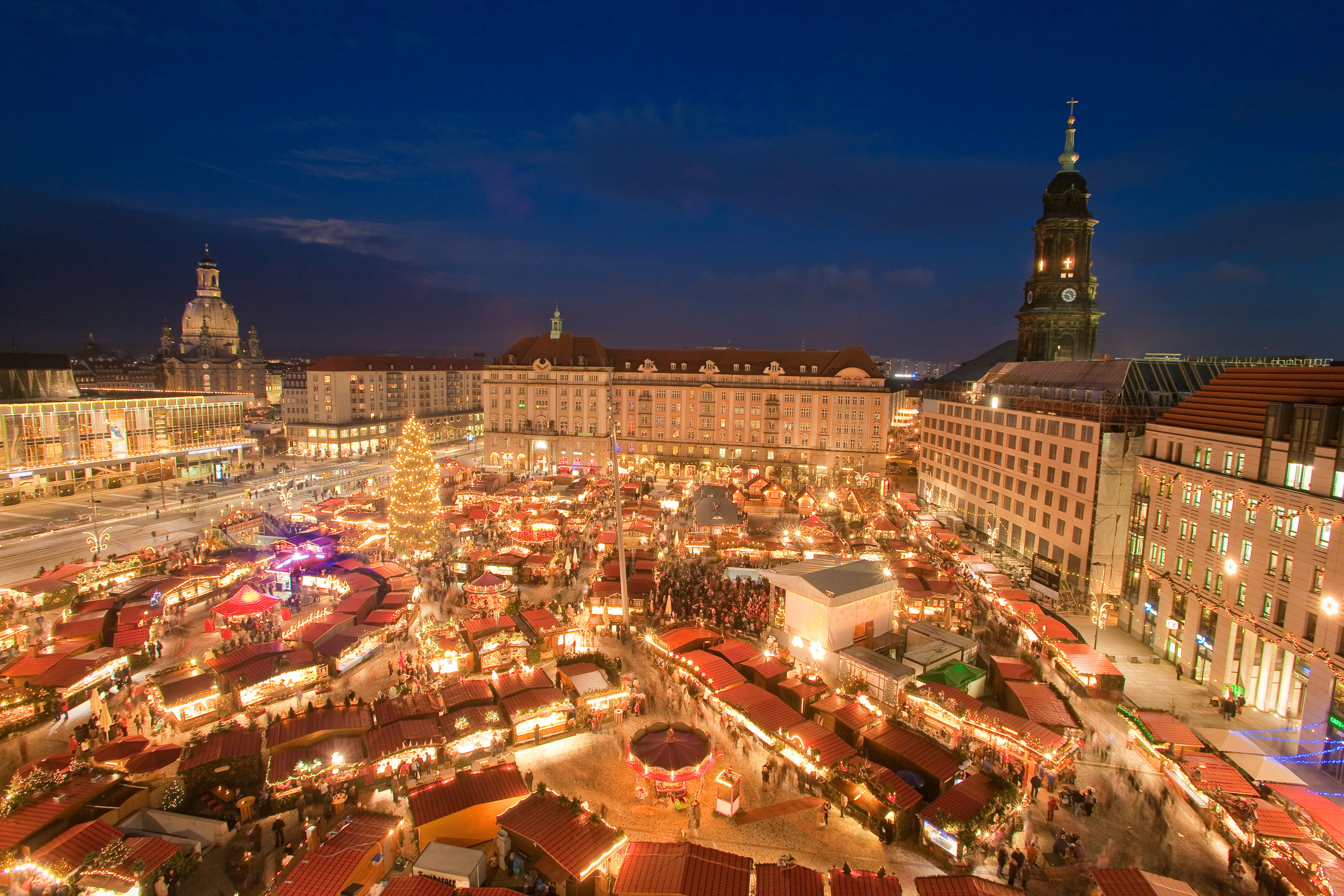
The Striezelmarkt in Dresden, Germany, one of the first Christmas markets in the world

In Germany, the Winterschlussverkauf (winter sale before the season ends) was one of two official sales periods (the other being the Sommerschlussverkauf, the summer sales). It begins on the last Monday in January and lasts for 12 days, selling left-over goods from the holiday shopping season, as well as the winter collections. However, unofficially, goods are sold at reduced prices by many stores throughout the whole of January. By the time the sales officially begin the only goods left on sale are low-quality ones, often specially manufactured for the sales. Since a legislative reform to the corresponding law in 2004, season sales are now allowed over the whole year and are no longer restricted to season-related goods. However, voluntary sales still called "Winterschlussverkauf" take place further on in most stores at the same time every year.

In Sweden, where the week of the first Advent Sunday marks the official start of the Christmas and holiday season, continuing with Saint Lucy's Day on December 13, followed up by Christmas before the Mellandagsrea (between days sell off) traditionally begins on December 27 (nowadays often December 26 or even December 25) and lasts during the rest of the Christmas holiday. It is similar to Black Friday, but lasts longer. They last 34–35 days. Black Friday itself has also gained publicity in Sweden since the early-2010s. The Swedish Christmas and holiday season continues over Epiphany, and finally ends on St. Knut's Day when the children have a Knut's party.

In Bosnia (Republika Srpska), Montenegro and Serbia, holiday sales starts in the middle of December and last for at least one month.

=== Asia ===
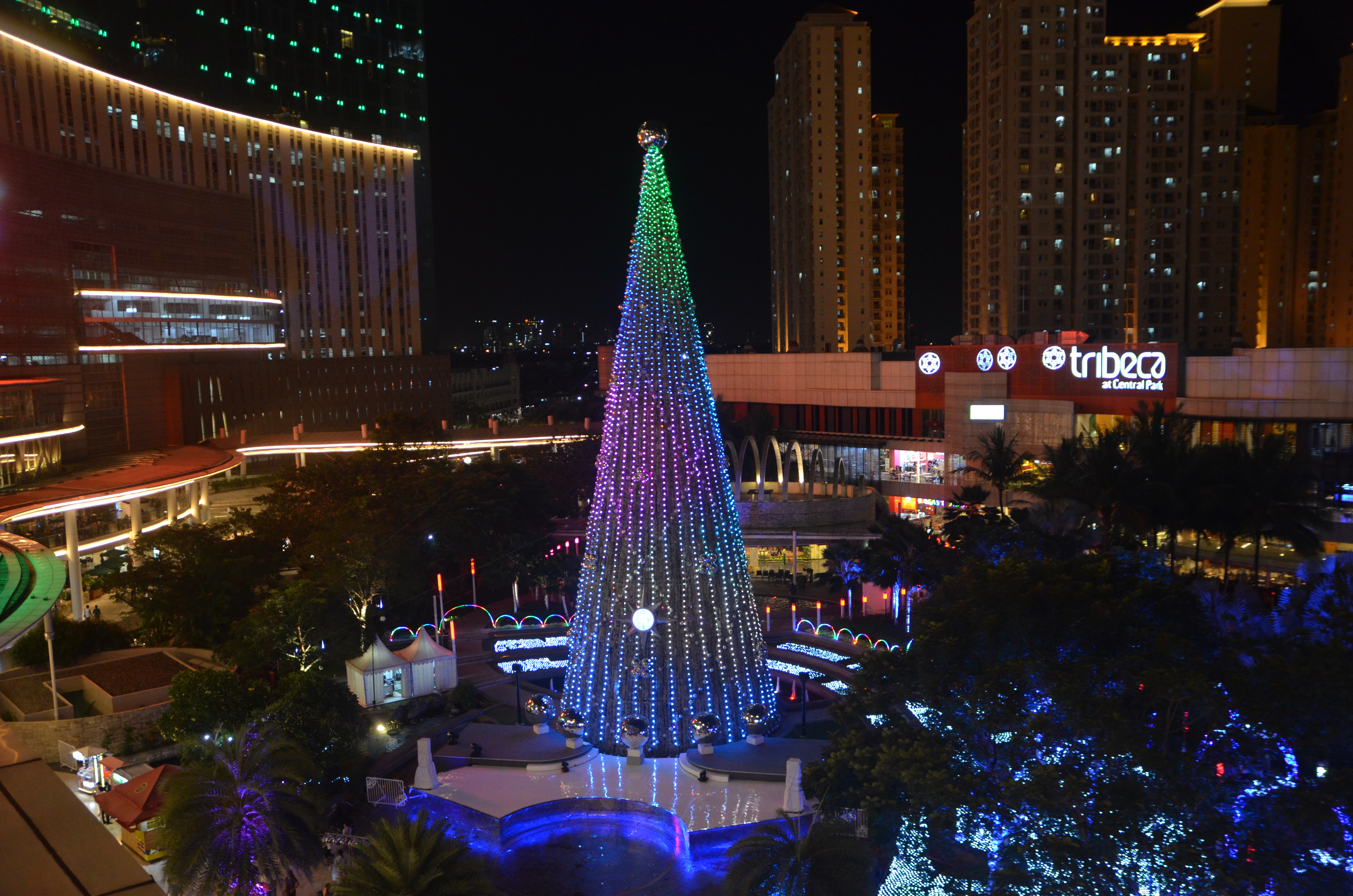
Christmas-decorated tree in Central Park Mall, Jakarta, Indonesia

In the Philippines, parols (star shaped lanterns) are hung and lights are lit. Simbang Gabi or dawn masses start December 16 and run for nine days until Christmas Eve.

Hong Kong has a lot of seasonal activities and traditions to offer around Christmas time. December 25 and 26 are Public Holidays that makes most shops open for shopping. Locals and tourists love to watch the 30-meter Swarovski Christmas tree in the Central as well as the Christmas light displays on buildings on Victoria Harbour. A huge party in Hong Kong called Winterfest is celebrated every year which involves malls, shops, theme parks and other attractions.

South Korea's population are 30 percent Christian and Christmas is a Public Holiday. According to the Washington Post, "Koreans prefer cash Christmas gifts over more creative presents."

Dark brown – countries that do not recognize Christmas on December 25 or January 7 as a public holiday. Light brown – countries that do not recognize Christmas as a public holiday, but the holiday is given observance.

Singapore widely celebrates Christmas which is a Public Holiday in this country. For six weeks, mid-November to early January, the 2.2-kilometre (1.4 mi) stretch of Orchard Road glitters with lights from decorated trees and building facades of malls and hotels.

Indonesia, a predominantly Muslim country, also celebrated Christmas as a public holiday. Every year, Ministry of Religious Affairs holds the National Christmas Celebration of the Republic of Indonesia. The program started in 1993 as a suggestion from Tiopan Bernhard Silalahi, who was Minister of Administrative and Bureaucratic Reform in the Sixth Development Cabinet, who has Protestant background, to the then President of Indonesia Soeharto. Since that, National Christmas Celebration has been held every year, except in 2004, which was canceled as a condolence for the victims of the 2004 Indian Ocean earthquake and tsunami, and in 2018, which was canceled as a condolence for the victims of the 2018 Sunda Strait tsunami. Until 2013, National Christmas Celebration was always held in Jakarta, the most common used venue was Jakarta Convention Center. But since 2014, the tradition was changed by the newly elected President of Indonesia Joko Widodo, and is now held in a different city each year.

== Medical analyses ==
Various studies have been performed on the effects of the Christmas and holiday season, which encompasses several feast days, on health. They have concluded that the health changes that occur during the Christmas and holiday season are not reversed during the rest of the year and have a long-term cumulative effect over a person's life, and that the risks of several medical problems increase during the Christmas and holiday season.

=== Alcohol ===
Heavy drinking significantly increases during December, particularly around Christmas and New Year's, leading to a rise in alcohol sales, consumption, and related harmful events and deaths.

Because of increased alcohol consumption at festivities and poorer road conditions during the winter months, alcohol-related road traffic collisions increase over the Christmas and holiday season.

=== Nutrition ===
Yanovski et al. investigated the assertion that the average American gains weight over the season. They found that average weight gain over the Christmas and holiday season is around 0.48 kilograms (1.1 lb). They also found that this weight gain is not reversed over the rest of the year, and concluded that this "probably contributes to the increase in body weight that frequently occurs during adulthood" (cf Lent). Research indicates that adults who weigh themselves daily with access to their weight graph tended to avoid holiday weight gain; however, self-weighing tends to decrease during the holiday season. Self-monitoring diet (e.g., food, calories, and fat) and physical activity each day helps adults avoid weight gain during the holidays.

Chan et al. investigated the increases in A1C and fasting plasma glucose in type 2 diabetic patients, to see whether these increases were steady throughout the year or varied seasonally. They concluded that the winter holidays did influence the glycemic control of the patients, with the largest increases being during that period, increases that "might not be reversed during the summer and autumn months".

The Christmas and holiday season, according to a survey by the ADA, is the second most popular reason, after birthdays, for sharing food in the workplace. The British Columbia Safety Council states that if proper food safety procedures are not followed, food set out for sharing in the workplace can serve as a breeding ground for bacteria, and recommends that perishable foods (for which it gives pizza, cold cuts, dips, salads, and sandwiches as examples) should not sit out for more than 2 hours.

=== Other issues ===
A survey conducted in 2005 found shopping caused headaches in nearly a quarter of people and sleeplessness in 11 percent.

Phillips et al. investigated whether some or all of the spike in cardiac mortality that occurs during December and January could be ascribed to the Christmas/New Year's holidays rather than to climatic factors. They concluded that the Christmas and holiday season is "a risk factor for cardiac and noncardiac mortality", stating that there are "multiple explanations for this association, including the possibility that holiday-induced delays in seeking treatment play a role in producing the twin holiday spikes".

The Asthma Society of Canada states that the Christmas and holiday season increases exposure to irritants because people spend 90 percent of their time indoors, and that seasonal decorations in the home introduce additional, further, irritants beyond the ones that exist all year around. It recommends that asthmatics avoid scented candles, for example, recommending either that candles not be lit or that soy or beeswax candles be used.

== Other impact and effects ==
According to the Stanford Recycling Center Americans throw away 25 percent more trash during the Christmas and holiday season than at other times of the year.

Because of the cold weather in the Northern Hemisphere, the Christmas and holiday season (as well as the second half of winter) is a time of increased use of fuel for domestic heating. This has prompted concerns in the United Kingdom about the possibility of a shortage in the domestic gas supply. However, in the event of an exceptionally long cold season, it is industrial users, signed on to interruptible supply contracts, who would find themselves without gas supply.

The U.S. Fire Administration states that the Christmas and holiday season is "a time of elevated risk for winter heating fires" and that the fact that many people celebrate the different holidays during the Christmas and holiday season by decorating their homes with seasonal garlands, electric lights, candles, and banners, has the potential to change the profile of fire incidence and cause. The Government of Alberta Ministry of Municipal Affairs states that candle-related fires rise by 140 percent during the Christmas and holiday season, with most fires involving human error and most deaths and injuries resulting from the failure to extinguish candles before going to bed. It states that consumers don't expect candle holders to tip over or to catch fire, assuming that they are safe, but that in fact candle holders can do this.

=== Week between Christmas and New Year ===
In recent years, the week-long period between Christmas Day and New Year's Day, which has been called Betwixtmas, Twixmas and, Twixtmas in the UK, Dead Week in the US, as well as various other names in other languages, has been increasingly recognized, often in a context relating to the confusion and aimlessness that occurs during this week owing to the typical lack of routine due to a widespread absence of work, school, or other responsibilities and schedule expectations for many. It has been said that one can often not be sure "what day it is" and that "time loses its meaning" during this period between the two holidays.

== Legal issues ==
=== United States ===
In the United States, the Establishment Clause of the First Amendment to the Constitution of the United States has had significant legal impact upon the activities of governments and of state-funded public schools during and relating to the Christmas and holiday season, and has been the source of controversy.

Public schools are subject to what the Anti-Defamation League terms the "December dilemma", namely the task of "acknowledging the various religious and secular holiday traditions celebrated during that time of year" while restricting observances of the various religious festivals to what is constitutionally permissible. The ADL and many school district authorities have published guidelines for schools and for teachers. For example, the directive on maintaining religious neutrality in public schools over the Christmas and holiday season, given to public school administrators in the District of Columbia by the superintendent, contains several points on what may and may not be taught in the District of Columbia Public Schools, the themes of parties and concerts, the uses of religious symbols, the locations of school events and classes and prayer.

=== Russia ===
In 2002, Moscow mayor Yuriy Luzhkov ordered all stores, restaurants, cafés and markets to display seasonal decorations and lights in their windows and interiors from December 1 onwards. Banks, post offices and public institutions were to do the same from December 15, with violators liable for fines of up to 200 rubles. Every business was ordered to have illuminated windows during the hours of 16:30 until 01:00. This caused a mixed reaction, with people objecting to being forced to put up decorations.

== See also ==
- List of winter festivals
- Seasonal affective disorder
- Winterval
