= Lucretia Magnusdotter (Gyllenhielm) =

Illegitimate daughter of a Swedish prince

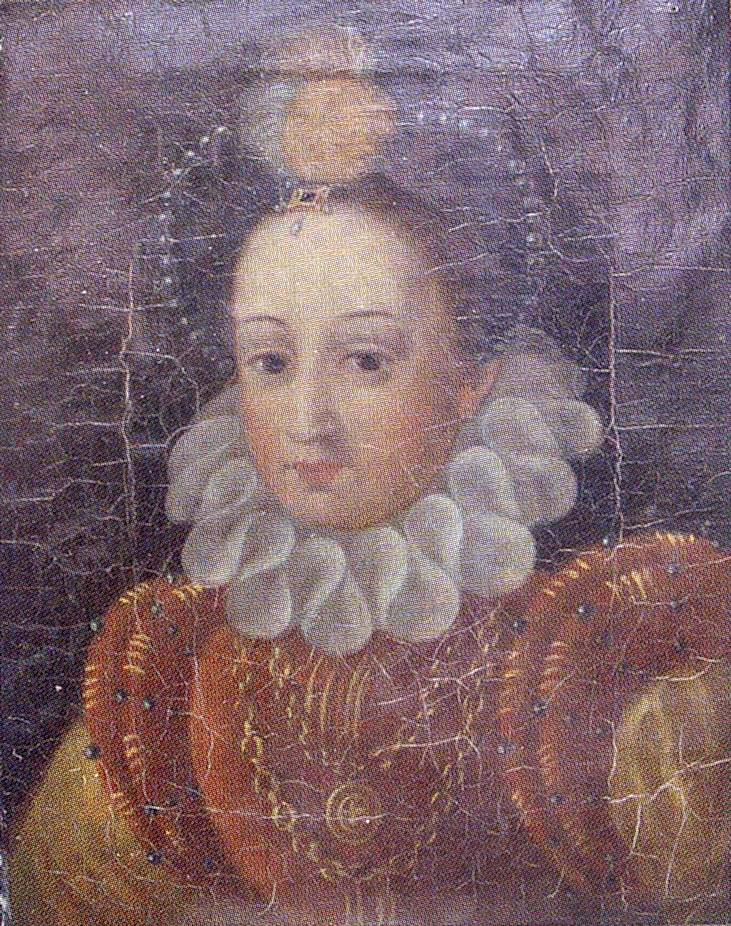
- Gyllenhielm as painted by Crommeny in the 1590s.
- Born: Lucretia Magnusdotter Gyllenhielm; 1562
- Died: 1624 (aged 61–62)
- Noble family: Vasa (illegittimate)
- Spouse: Christoffer von Warnstedt
- Issue: Carl; Johan; Magnus; Christina; Melcher
- Father: Magnus, Duke of Östergötland
- Mother: Valborg Eriksdotter
- Occupation: Chief Court Mistress to Maria of the Palatinate, Duchess of Södermanland

Lucretia Magnusdotter (Gyllenhielm) (1562-1624), was the illegitimate daughter of the Swedish prince Magnus, Duke of Östergötland, and Valborg Eriksdotter. She married the German noble Christoffer von Warnstedt (1542-1627) in 1586.

== Life ==
As was the tradition with the illegitimate children of royalty, she was raised by her mother until the age of three. Thereafter, she was placed in the care of her aunt, Princess Elizabeth of Sweden, to whom she became a courtier as an adult.

In 1581, she followed Elizabeth to her wedding in Germany with Christopher, Duke of Mecklenburg-Gadebusch. There, she met the nobleman and courtier Christoffer von Warnstedt and wished to marry him, but she was not granted permission by John III of Sweden until 1586.

The couple settled in Sweden, where her spouse became governor and she the head lady in waiting (hovmästarinna) to Maria of the Palatinate-Simmern, consort of her uncle King Charles IX of Sweden.

== Issue ==
1. Carl (1587-29 November 1607)
2. Johan (1590 - 1628), married to Anna Kyle.
3. Magnus (-1626)
4. Christina (24 March 1600 - 15 April 1654)
5. Melcher (June 1602 - 21 February 1655)

== Other sources ==
- Gadd, Pia (Swedish): Frillor, fruar och herrar - en okänd kvinnohistoria (Mistresses, wives and masters - an unknown history of women) Falun 2009
