= 1985 in Nordic music =

The following is a list of notable events and releases that happened in Nordic music in 1985.

== Events ==
- 4 May – At the Eurovision Song Contest 1985, held in Gothenburg, Sweden, Norway wins the contest for the first time, with "La det swinge", performed by Bobbysocks!. Sweden finish 3rd, Finland 9th and Denmark 11th.
- July The Tangomarkkinat festival is founded in Finland.
- 16 September – A-ha release a new version of their previously unsuccessful 1984 single "Take On Me", accompanied by a new video.
- 25 December – Danish heavy metal band King Diamond, formed earlier in the year, release their debut single, "No Presents for Christmas".

== Classical works ==
- Kalevi Aho
  - Oboe Sonata
  - Solo II, for piano
- Magnus Lindberg – Kraft
- Einojuhani Rautavaara – Symphony No. 5
- Aulis Sallinen – Symphony No. 5, "Washington Mosaics"

== Hit singles ==
- A-ha
  - "Take On Me" (#1 Australia, Austria, Belgium, Greece, Italy, Netherlands, Norway, Sweden, Switzerland, West Germany)
  - "The Sun Always Shines on T.V." (#1 Ireland, UK; #2 Denmark, Norway)
- Gemini – "Just Like That"/"Live On The Love" (#24 Netherlands)
- Gnags – "Elskende I Sommerlandet" (#4 Denmark)
- Hjálparsveitin – "Hjálpum þeim" (charity recording)
- Imperiet – "Balladen om Briggen Blue Bird av Hull"
- Tone Norum – "Can't You Stay" (#2 Sweden)
- Swedish Metal Aid – "Give A Helpin' Hand"

== Eurovision Song Contest ==
- Denmark in the Eurovision Song Contest 1985
- Finland in the Eurovision Song Contest 1985
- Norway in the Eurovision Song Contest 1985
- Sweden in the Eurovision Song Contest 1985

== Film and television music ==
- Björn Isfält – My Life as a Dog

== Births ==
- 16 May – Emilíana Torrini, Icelandic singer-songwriter
- 8 September – Ragnar Þórhallsson, vocalist and guitarist

== Deaths ==
- 19 May – Hilding Rosenberg, Swedish composer (born 1892)
- 29 May – Christian Hartmann, Norwegian composer (born 1910).
- 5 August – Olav Kielland, composer and orchestra conductor (born 1901).
- 13 September – Ruth Althén, Swedish operatic soprano (born 1890)
- 3 October – Yngve Stoor, Swedish singer and composer (born 1912)
- 18 November – Stephan Henrik Barratt-Due, Norwegian violinist and music teacher (born 1919).
