= Valborg Eriksdotter =

Valborg Eriksdotter (1545–1580), was the royal mistress of Magnus, Duke of Östergötland, from 1560 to 1567. She was the only official mistress of Magnus, aside from Anna von Haugwitz. She was the mother of his acknowledged illegitimate daughter, Lucretia Magnusdotter (Gyllenhielm).

Valborg's background is uncertain, but she is believed to have been the daughter of a priest. Notably, she could read and write, which was uncommon at the time. She became Magnus's official mistress in 1560 and accompanied him to Vadstena when he left court to reside at Vadstena Castle as duke of Östergötland. In 1563, Magnus fell mentally ill, and his brother, King Erik XIV of Sweden, gave Valborg many gifts to ensure she stayed with Magnus during his illness. She requested and was granted an entire private floor at Vadstena Castle for herself and her children. Valborg also visited the court at Stockholm and is believed to be the unidentified royal mistress mentioned as a friend of Karin Månsdotter during the Sture Murders in 1567. She remained Magnus's mistress at Nyköping Castle in the autumn of 1567, but by November, the relationship seems to have ended.

By autumn of 1567, Valborg had married a "Master Hans" whose identity is unclear. It is noted that she visited Magnus in late 1567 and that she, by all accounts, was regarded to have a good effect upon him. She became a widow in the autumn of 1568 and was granted several estates by King John III, which provided her with a good income. Shortly thereafter, she remarried, likely to a nobleman or officer, though his identity is unknown. Valborg died in 1580 on one of her estates, likely of the plague that was present in Sweden that year.
