= Raska fötter springa tripp, tripp, tripp =

Song
- Language: Swedish
- Published: 1901
- Genre: children, Christmas
- Songwriter: Sigrid Sköldberg-Pettersson
- Composer: Emmy Köhler

Raska fötter springa tripp, tripp, tripp or just Raska fötter, is a Christmas song, originally published in Julklappen in 1901. The song, originally entitled Liten julvisa, describes a time when on several places in Sweden, the Christmas goat was still the Christmas giftbringer, and not Santa Claus. Sigrid Sköldberg-Pettersson (1870–1941) wrote lyrics while Emmy Köhler (1858–1925) wrote music.

The song lyrics describe Christmas celebrations in a family from the first Christmas presents are wrapped until the Christmas tree is taken out. The song remained in popularity throughout the 20th century, and is often sung when dancing around the Christmas tree. Despite Santa Claus replacing the Christmas Goat, the lyrics describe Swedish Christmas celebrations as most Swedes know it throughout the 20th century, with the family gathered around the Christmas tree, and Christmas presents.

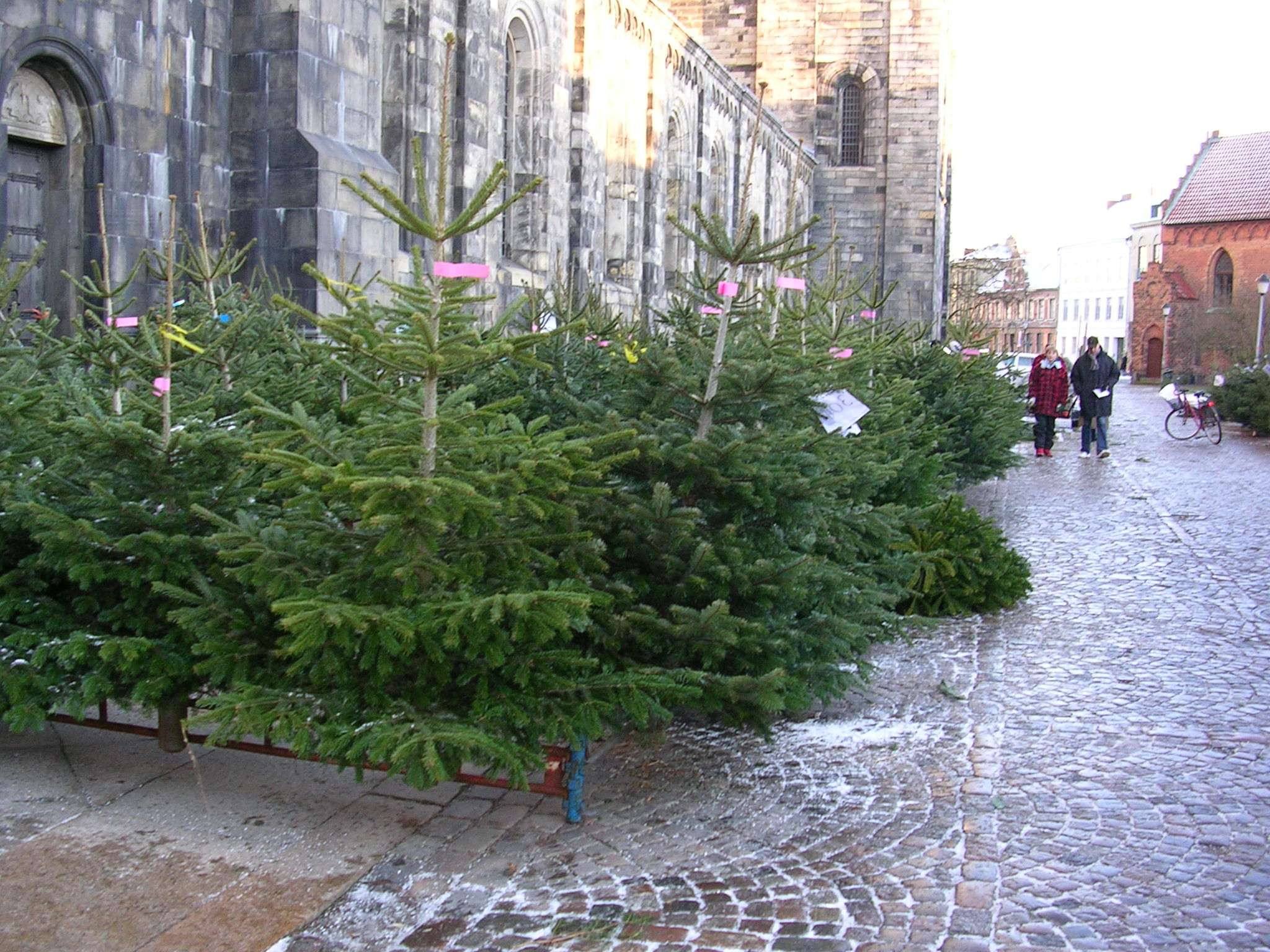
Song lyrics describe Christmas passing by, step by step.

== Publication ==
- Nu ska vi sjunga, 1943, as "Liten julvisa", under the lines "Julsånger"
- Julens önskesångbok, 1997, as "Raska fötter springa tripp, tripp, tripp", under the lines "Traditionella julsånger"
- Barnens svenska sångbok, 1999, as "Raska fötter springa tripp, tripp, tripp (Liten julvisa)", under the lines "Året runt".

== Recordings ==
An early recording was done by Alice Skoglund in February 1928, and the record was released in October that year. The song was also recorded by the Glenmark Family on the 1983 album Från advent till jul.
