= Kjell Roikjer =

Danish composer and bassoonist

Kjell Maale Roikjer (14 June 1901 – 19 September 1999) was a Danish composer and bassoonist.

== Early life and education ==
Roikjer was born and grew up in Malmö, Sweden, where his parents were photographers. At 17, he moved to Copenhagen and began an apprenticeship as a scene painter, but left it a few years later to pursue music. He had learned violin, but decided instead to become a bassoonist because there was less competition, and studied under Knud Lassen.

== Career ==
He began his career in 1924 in Sweden, as bassoon soloist in the Helsingborg Symphony Orchestra. In 1926 he returned to Copenhagen, becoming a member of the Tivoli Concert Hall orchestra and permanent assistant with the new Radio Symphony Orchestra. He became a Danish citizen in 1928. He was a founder member of the chamber ensemble Blæserkvintetten af 1932 (Woodwind Quintet of 1932), in which he played until 1948.

From 1938 until his retirement as a player in 1971, he was a member of the Royal Danish Orchestra, where he succeeded Lassen as bassoon soloist in 1943. He also worked as an archivist at the Tivoli Concert Hall, assisting in the reconstruction of the sheet music library following the hall's destruction by the occupying Germans during World War II.

== Compositions ==
Roikjer composed approximately 100 works, about one third after his retirement. His style was classically-inspired, in the French manner. He wrote mostly for small ensembles, often employing less frequently used instruments such as tuba, xylophone and saxophone.

=== Selected works ===
- Introduction and Theme with Variations for Viola Solo, Op.29
- Concerto for Xylophone and Orchestra, Op.34
- Woodwind Quintet, Op.42
- Divertimento for Flute and Viola, Op.45
- Variations, Chorale and Fugue on a theme by Carl Nielsen for 4 Trombones, Op.51
- Variations and Rondo on a Swedish Folksong for Brass Quintet, Op.53
- 10 Inventions for 2 Tubas, Op.55
- Variations and Finale on a Norwegian Folksong for Brass Quintet, Op.56
- Scherzo for Brass Quintet, Op.53
- Concerto for Tuba and Orchestra, Op.61
- Capriccio for Tuba and Orchestra, Op.66
- Sonata for Tuba and Piano, Op.68
- Andante for Tuba and Piano, Op.65
- Tonal Miniature Pieces in All Keys for Tuba and Piano, Op.75
- Concerto for Bassoon and String Orchestra, Op.90
