= Magnus, Duke of Östergötland =

Swedish prince and duke

Magnus
- Duke of Östergötland
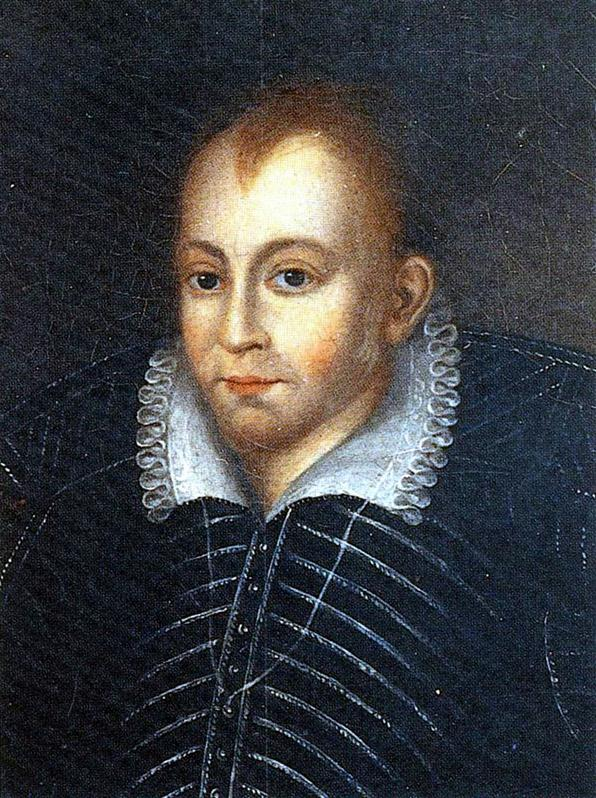
- Prince Magnus of Sweden
- Born: 25 July 1542
- Died: 26 June 1595 (aged 52); Kungsbro
- Burial: Vadstena Abbey
- Issue: Lucretia Magnusdotter Gyllenhielm; Helena Magnusdotter Gyllenhielm; Virginia Magnusdotter Gyllenhielm
- House: Vasa
- Father: Gustav Vasa of Sweden
- Mother: Margareta Leijonhufvud

Magnus Vasa (25 July 1542 – 26 June 1595), prince of Sweden, Duke of Östergötland from 1555. Magnus was the third son of King Gustav Vasa. His mother was queen Margareta Leijonhufvud.

== Biography ==
Magnus was the only one of Gustav Vasa's sons—except for Karl and Sten, who died in infancy—that did not become king of Sweden. In 1555, he was made Duke of Östergötland, including the hundreds of Kinda and Ydre in Småland, the province of Dalsland, Sundbo Hundred in Närke, the hundreds of Kåkind and Valla, and most of Vadsbo Hundred in Västergötland. As Duke of Östergötland, he resided permanently at Vadstena Castle in Vadstena.

Magnus suffered from a severe mental illness. The illness showed its first signs in 1563, and eventually became permanent. In 1574, the responsibility of his fiefs were taken over by his brother King John III, who managed them as his guardian because of his mental condition. A smaller part of them was granted to his other brother, Charles.

Magnus died at the Manorhouse of Kungsbro, outside Linköping, in 1595 and is buried in the Bridgettine Abbey Church in Vadstena.

== Legacy ==
Many ballads and stories were inspired by Magnus and his alleged interest in mythological creatures such as fairies.

There are many stories about the "Mad Duke", for instance about how he saw a mermaid in the castle moat and threw himself out of a window, nearly drowning himself. There is no proof that this event ever took place, but the story might have evolved from an incident in 1563 when he fell in the moat, during the construction of the castle drawbridge. Geijer and Afzelius note that the alleged mermaid incident appears to have found its way into the ballad "Hertig Magnus och Hafsfrun" ("Herr Mannelig").

== Issue ==
Magnus was never married. He had three confirmed and acknowledged children outside of marriage.

With Valborg Eriksdotter:

1. Lucretia Magnusdotter (Gyllenhielm) (1562–1624), married to nobleman Christoffer von Warnstedt

With Anna von Haubitz

1. Helena Gyllenhielm (1572-1630), married to nobleman Wollmar Yxkull

Mother unknown:

1. Virginia

== Ancestry ==
Ancestors of Magnus, Duke of Östergötland

Johan Kristiersson (Vasa)
Erik Johansson (Vasa)
Birgitta Gustafsdotter (Sture)
Gustav I of Sweden (Vasa)
Måns Karlsson (Eka)
Cecilia Månsdotter (Eka)
Sigrid Eskilsdotter (Banér)
Magnus of Sweden (Vasa)
Abraham Kristiernsson (Leijonhuvud)
Erik Abrahamsson (Leijonhufvud)
Birgitta Månsdotter (Natt och Dag)
Margareta Leijonhufvud
Erik Karlsson (Vasa)
Ebba Eriksdotter (Vasa)
Anna Karlsdotter (Vinstorpa)

== Sources ==
- "Magnus Gustavsson Vasa". Historiesajten.
- "Vadstena kloster och stad". Bengans historiasidor.
