= Ivar Hallström =

Swedish composer (1826–1901)

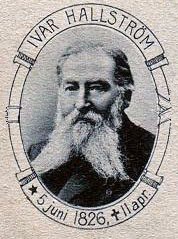
Ivar Hallström

Ivar Christian Hallström (5 June 1826 – 11 April 1901) was a Swedish composer, particularly of opera.

== Life ==
Hallström was born and died in Stockholm. Although he learnt the piano, he was self-taught as a composer. He studied law in Uppsala and in 1853 was appointed librarian to Prince Oscar which assisted him in advancing his career as a composer. His operas in collaboration with the librettist Frans Hedberg launched his operatic career, where he was particularly able to use Swedish folk tunes effectively. Hallström introduced a flavour of Gallic wit into his light operas, many of them based on French libretti. Fourteen operatic works survive.

He was one of the founding members of Sällskapet Idun, a men's association founded in Stockholm in 1862.

After many years neglect, Hallström’s operas were revived, in Umeå in 1986 with Bergtagna, seen also at the York Early Music Festival in 1988, Hertig Magnus at Vadstena in 1988 and 2000, also broadcast on Swedish television, and Liten Karin in 1997, also at Vadstena, with Malena Ernman as Princess Cecilia.

== Compositions ==
- Hertig Magnus och sjöjungfrun (Duke Magnus and the mermaid) – romantic operetta
- Mjölnarvargen (after Le diable au moulin by Eugène Cormon and Michel Carré) - operetta
- Den bergtagna (The bride of the mountain king) – romantic opera
- Vikingarne (The Vikings) – romantic opera
- Neaga - opera
- Per Svinaherde (Peter the swineherd) – fairy play
- Ett äfventyr i Skottland (An Adventure in Scotland) - ballet in two acts
- En dröm (A dream) - ballet in one act
