= Frans Hedberg =

Swedish playwright and poet

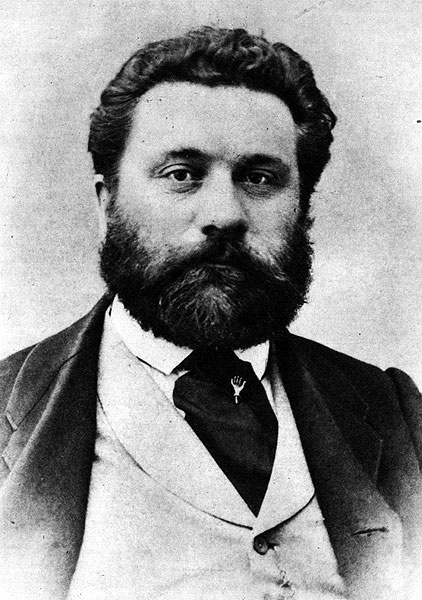
- Born: Frans Theodor Hedberg; 2 March 1828; Stockholm, Sweden
- Died: 8 June 1908 (aged 80); Vaxholm, Sweden
- Occupations: Playwright, poet
- Writing career
- Pen name: Esbern Snare; Palle Block; Paul Qvitt

Frans Theodor Hedberg (2 March 1828 – 8 June 1908) was a Swedish playwright and poet. He is also known by his pseudonyms: Esbern Snare, Palle Block, and Paul Qvitt.

== Biography ==
He was born at Stockholm, Sweden. After growing up in an orphanage he tried various professions, including that of actor and wig-maker, before he set seriously to work as a playwright in 1854. Afterwards he was appointed a reader, and then teacher, at the Royal Theatre in Stockholm (1861), and later director of the New Theatre, Gothenburg (1881). In 1883 he gave up this position to devote himself entirely to writing.

His works include comedies, tragedies, adaptations, translations, vaudevilles, and poems. The best known of his plays is Bröllopet på Ulfåsa (The Wedding at Ulfåsa; 1865). He also wrote Svenska skådespelare: karakteristiker och porträtter (Swedish Actors: Characteristics and Portraits, 1884) and Svenska operasångare: karakteristiker och porträtter (Swedish Opera Singers: Characteristics and Portraits, 1885) as well as other works dealing with theater subjects.
