= Emmy Köhler =

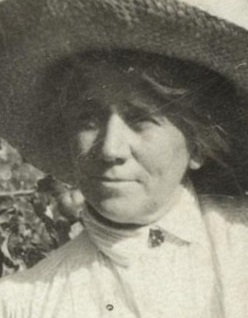

Background information
- Born: 22 May 1858; Stockholm, Sweden
- Died: 2 February 1925 (aged 66) Fresta, Sweden
- Genres: children, Christian hymns
- Occupation: composer

Emmy Köhler (22 May 1858 – 2 February 1925) was a Swedish hymnwriter and writer. She was born in Stockholm.

Among her more famous works is the Christmas carol "Nu tändas tusen juleljus" and the music for the children's Christmas song "Raska fötter springa tripp, tripp, tripp" ("Liten julvisa"), the later with lyrics by Sigrid Sköldberg-Pettersson. She died in Fresta.
