= Sigrid Sköldberg-Pettersson =

- Born: 7 October 1870; Stockholm, Sweden
- Died: 15 October 1941 (aged 71) Oscar Parish, Stockholm, Sweden
- Genres: children
- Occupation: song lyricist

Sigrid Sköldberg-Pettersson (7 October 1870, Stockholm, Sweden – 15 October 1941, Oscar Parish, Stockholm, Sweden) was a Swedish song lyricist. She has written many children's songs. One of her most famous works is the lyrics for the Christmas song Raska fötter springa tripp, tripp, tripp ("Liten julvisa"), while Emmy Köhler composed the music.
