= Hanging of the greens =

Christian ceremony

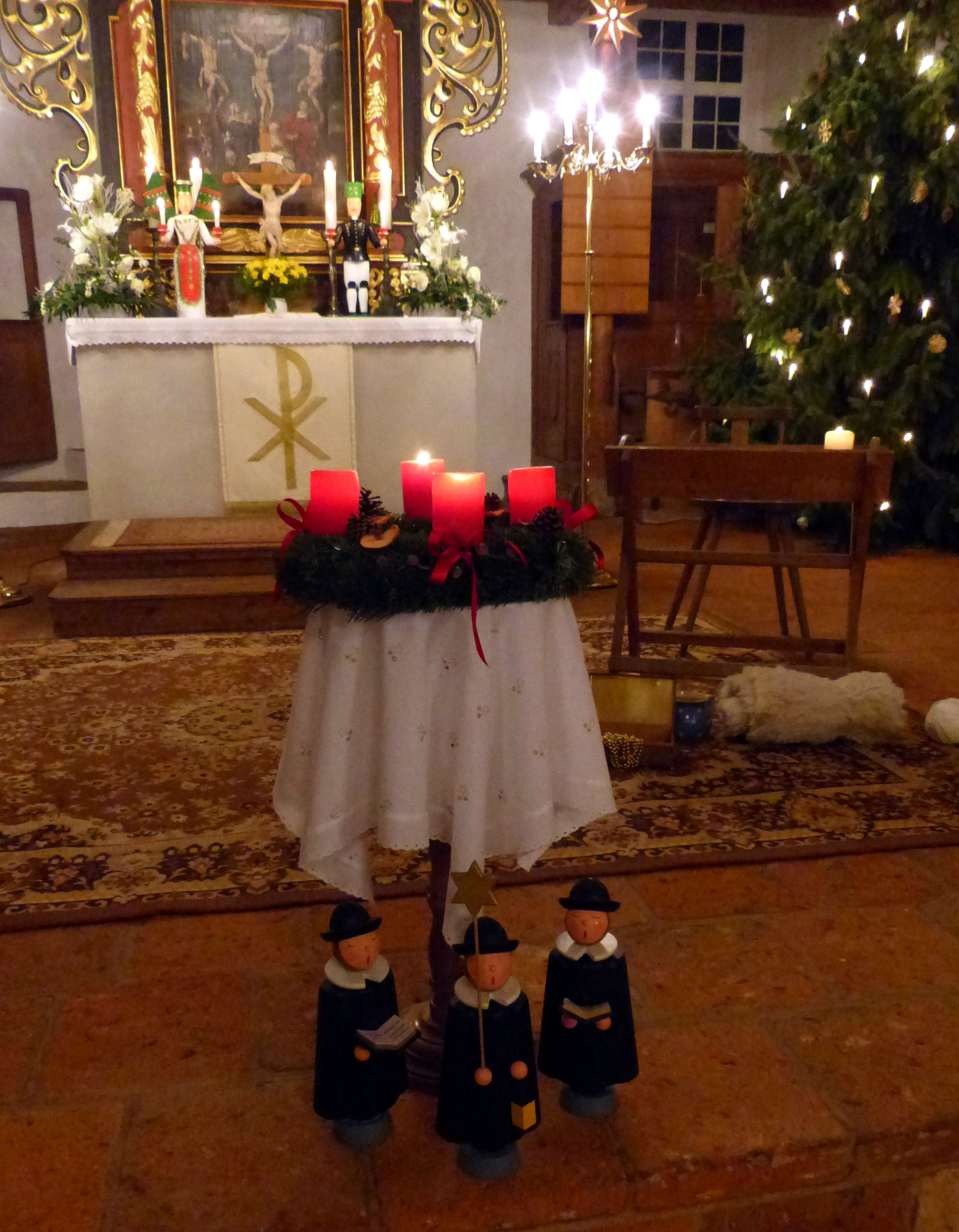
Items such as the Chrismon/Christmas tree and Advent wreath are placed in the church during the hanging of the greens ceremony

The hanging of the greens is a Western Christian ceremony in which many congregations and people adorn their churches, as well as other buildings (such as a YWCA or university), with Advent and Christmas decorations. This is done on or directly before the start of the Advent season, in preparation for Christmastide. The service involves the placement of evergreen vegetation in the parish. Items such as the evergreen wreath, in Christianity, carry the religious symbolism of everlasting life, a theological concept within that faith. As such, during the liturgy, "Biblical passages and other readings help explain the significance of the holly, the cedar, the Advent wreath, the Chrismon tree, and any other special decorations". Christmas trees are frequently erected during the hanging of the greens, although they are sometimes left bare until Christmas Eve.

Outside of a formal liturgy, in many countries, such as Sweden, people start to set up their Advent and Christmas decorations on the first day of Advent. In the Western Christian world, the two traditional days when Christmas decorations are removed are Twelfth Night, and if they are not taken down on that day, Candlemas, the latter of which ends the Christmas-Epiphany season in some denominations. Leaving the decorations up beyond Candlemas is historically considered to be inauspicious.

== See also ==
- Advent wreath
- Blue Christmas
- Gaudete Sunday
