= Stir-up Sunday =

Last Sunday before Advent

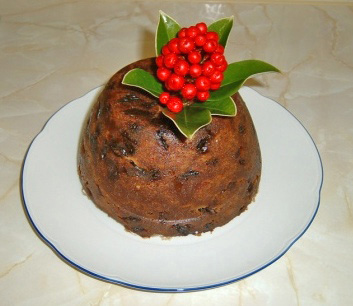
- Traditionally, the preparation of Christmas puddings began on Stir-up Sunday.
- Observed by: Western Christianity
- Type: Christianity
- Date: Sunday before Advent Sunday
- 2025 date: 23 November
- 2026 date: 22 November
- 2027 date: 21 November
- 2028 date: 26 November
- Frequency: annual
- Related to: Christmas Day

Stir-up Sunday is an informal term in Catholic and Anglican churches for the last Sunday before the season of Advent. It gets its name from the beginning of the collect for the day in the Book of Common Prayer, which begins with the words, "Stir up, we beseech thee, O Lord, the wills of thy faithful people...", but it has become associated with the custom of making the Christmas puddings on that day. The Christmas pudding is a British Christmas tradition said to have been introduced by Prince Albert, consort of Queen Victoria, even as the meatless version was already brought from Germany by George I in 1714. Most recipes for Christmas pudding require it to be cooked well in advance of Christmas and then reheated on Christmas Day, so the collect of the day served as a useful reminder.

== Family activity ==
Traditionally, families gather together in the kitchen of their homes to mix and steam Christmas pudding on Stir-up Sunday. Parents teach their children how to mix ingredients for the pudding. Everyone takes a turn to stir the pudding mix, for each person involved is able to make a special wish for the year ahead. Practically, stirring the mixture is hard work, therefore as many people as possible are involved. By tradition, the pudding mixture is stirred from East to West in honour of the three wise men who visited the Infant Jesus (commemorated on Epiphany, which occurs much much later during Christmastide).

In some households, silver coins or other charms are added to the pudding mix. It is believed that finding a coin brings good luck.

In a 2013 survey, two-thirds of British children reported that they had never experienced stirring Christmas pudding mix, reflecting consumers' preference for ready-made puddings widely available in shops.

== History and etymology ==
The term stir-up Sunday comes from the opening words of the collect for the day in the 1549 Book of Common Prayer and later (a translation of the Roman Missal's collect "Excita, quæsumus" used on the last Sunday before Advent):

Excita, quæsumus, Domine, tuorum fidelium voluntates: ut divini operis fructum propensius exsequentes, pietatis tuæ remedia maiora percipiant: Per Christum Dominum nostrum. Amen.

Translation:

Stir up, we beseech thee, O Lord, the wills of thy faithful people; that they, plenteously bringing forth the fruit of good works, may of thee be plenteously rewarded; through Jesus Christ our Lord. Amen.

In the Book of Common Prayer and later editions, this collect is listed for "The Twenty-Fifth Sunday After Trinity", with a rubric specifying that this collect "shall always be used upon the Sunday next before Advent". This reinforced the significance of this day as forming part of the preparation for the season of Advent. The rubric is necessary because the last Sunday before Advent does not always fall on the 25th Sunday after Trinity Sunday. Trinity Sunday is a moveable feast and the Advent season is fixed, so the number of weeks in between varies from year to year. Thus, this collect was always read just before Advent – as it in the pre-1969 Roman Missal whence it came (where the Sunday is called the "24th Sunday after Pentecost", but the remaining Sundays After Epiphany are "caught-up" between the 23rd and the 24th, making it always the last before Advent).

Since most recipes for Christmas pudding call for the pudding to be kept for several weeks to mature, the day subsequently became connected, in countries which used the Book of Common Prayer, with the preparation of Christmas puddings in readiness for Christmas.

In recent years most provinces of the Anglican Communion have adopted the practice of the Catholic Church in observing this Sunday as Christ the King (sometimes under the name "The Reign of Christ"). Popular attachment to the "Stir up" collect has, however, caused it to be retained (in contemporary language) in the liturgies of several provinces. The Church of England's "Common Worship" uses it as the Post-Communion prayer, with a rubric stating that it "may be used as the Collect at Morning and Evening Prayer during this week".

In the Catholic Ordinariates for former Anglicans, Divine Worship: The Missal appoints the "stir up" collect for use on any of the weekdays between the Solemnity of Christ the King which are not themselves Feasts or Obligatory Memorials. The collect thus functions as the collect for the Sunday Next Before Advent, even though the Sunday with that title is now a liturgical fiction, always being impeded by the higher ranking Solemnity of Christ the King. However, the fictional Sunday nonetheless provides the real collect for the following weekdays, as in other weeks in the calendar where a Sunday is occasionally impeded by a higher ranking Feast. The collect thus continues to be used the week before Advent.

In addition, one of the two choices in Divine Worship: The Missal for the collect for the Second Sunday in Advent begins with the words, "Stir up our hearts, O Lord." The other collect option on the Second Sunday in Advent is the more famous "Read, mark, learn, and inwardly digest". However, another collect featuring the phrase "stir up" within the Advent season is the collect for Ember Friday in Advent, which in the Ordinariates occurs on the Friday in the first week of Advent, beginning "Stir up, we beseech thee, O Lord, thy power."

In the Episcopal Church in the United States, the collect designated for the Third Sunday of Advent in the 1979 Book of Common Prayer commences with the invocation, "stir up your power, O Lord." Consequently, within numerous Episcopal congregations, the Third Sunday of Advent, commonly known as Gaudete Sunday, is referred to as "Stir-up Sunday". Marion J. Hatchett in his definitive work "Commentary on the American Prayer Book", notes that in the Pre-Reformation English Sarum Rite, the collects for four of the last five Sundays preceding Christmas commenced with the words excita, or 'stir up'. A comparable collect to the one appointed in the 1979 Book of Common Prayer is found in the recent book authorized for use in the Church of England, "Common Worship", designated for the Second Sunday of Advent; however, in this version, the phrase "raise up" is employed instead.

== See also ==
- Advent Sunday
- Feast of Christ the King
- Gaudete Sunday
- Totensonntag
