= Advent Sunday =

First day of liturgical year and start of the season of Advent

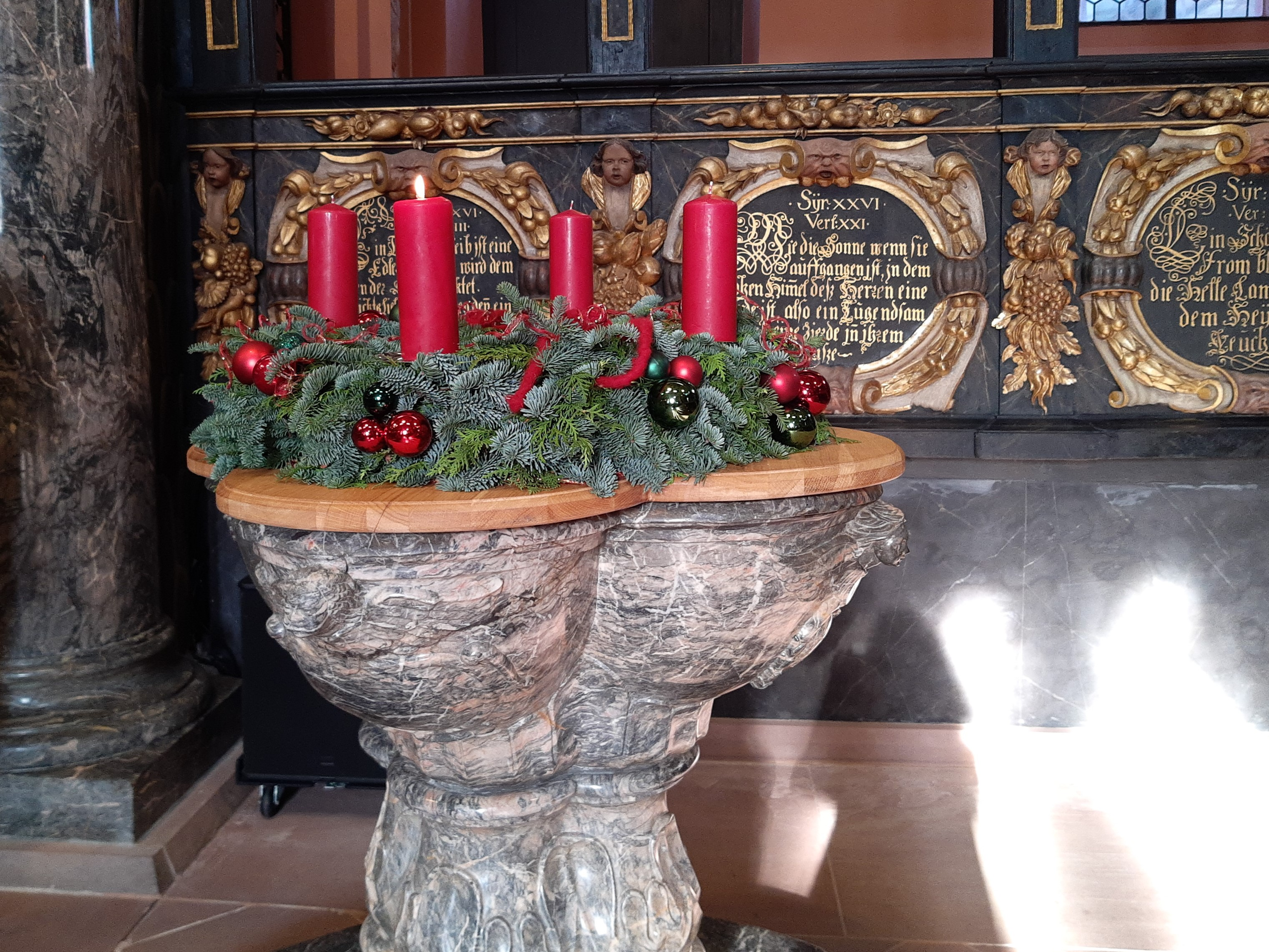
- An Advent wreath with the first candle lit
- Observed by: Western Christianity
- Type: Christian
- Celebrations: Season of Advent
- Date: Fourth Sunday before Christmas Day
- 2025 date: 30 November
- 2026 date: 29 November
- 2027 date: 28 November
- 2028 date: 3 December
- Frequency: annual
- Related to: Christmas Day

Advent Sunday, also called the First Sunday of Advent or First Advent Sunday, is the first day of the liturgical year in the Western Christian Churches and the start of the Christian season of Advent; a time of preparation for the celebration of Christ's birth at Christmas and the return of Christ at the Second Coming.

== Observance ==
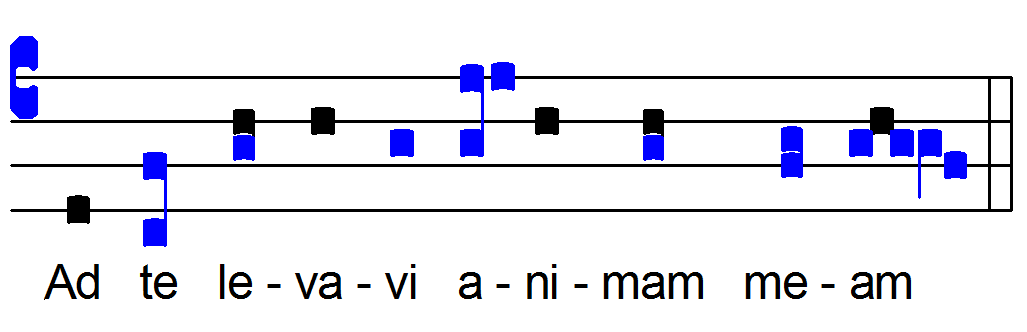
Ad te levavi animam meam ("Unto thee lift I up my soul"), beginning of the introit of the First Sunday of Advent

On the First Sunday of Advent, Christians start lighting the candles of their Advent wreaths, and praying their Advent daily devotional. The faithful may also erect a Chrismon tree or light a Christingle. They may also prepare for Christmas in other ways, such as setting up Christmas decorations, a custom that is sometimes done liturgically through a hanging of the greens ceremony.

=== Denominational differences ===
In Lutheran, Anglican, and Methodist churches the celebrant wears violet-coloured or blue vestments on this day, and the first violet or blue Advent candle is lit in the worship service. In the Church of Sweden, a Lutheran national Church, the liturgical colour is specifically white: the motivation is that the day is a joyful feast (the colour is changed to blue, the traditional colour for Advent in Scandinavia, or—if the church does not possess blue vestments—violet, after 6 p.m.). Zechariah 9:9–10 and Matthew 21:1–9 are always read in the service, and the symbolism of the day is that Christ enters the church.

Likewise, in the Roman Rite of the Catholic Church, Advent also "begins with First Vespers (Evening Prayer I) of the Sunday that falls on or closest to 30 November and it ends before First Vespers (Evening Prayer I) of Christmas". The colour violet or purple is used in Advent, but where it is the practice the colour rose may be used on Gaudete Sunday (Third Sunday of Advent).

== Date ==
Advent Sunday is the fourth Sunday before Christmas Day, whether celebrated according to the Gregorian or Julian calendar.

It can fall on any date between 27 November and 3 December. When Christmas Day is a Monday, Advent Sunday will fall on its latest possible date.

For most Christians, Advent Sunday is the Sunday nearest to St. Andrew's Day, 30 November. It is possible to compute the date of Advent Sunday by adding three days to the date of the last Thursday of November; it can also be computed as the Sunday before the first Thursday of December.

In the Ambrosian Rite and the Mozarabic Rite, the First Sunday in Advent comes two weeks earlier than in the Roman, being on the Sunday after St. Martin's Day (11 November), six weeks before Christmas.

== See also ==
- Stir-up Sunday
