= Chrismon =

Chrismon may refer to:

- Chrismon, a Christogram
  - Chrismon, the Chi Rho monogram
- Signum manus or Chrismon, the medieval European practice of signing a document or charter with a special type of monogram or royal cypher
- Chrismon, a type of Christmas decoration, such as a Chrismon tree
- Chrismon (magazine), a German Lutheran magazine

== See also ==
- Chrisma (disambiguation)
