= Chrisma =

Chrisma may refer to:

- Chrism, a consecrated oil used in various Christian denominations
- Krisma, originally known as Chrisma, an Italian new wave/electronic music duo

== See also ==
- Chrismon (disambiguation)
