= Advent wreath =

Symbol of Advent period

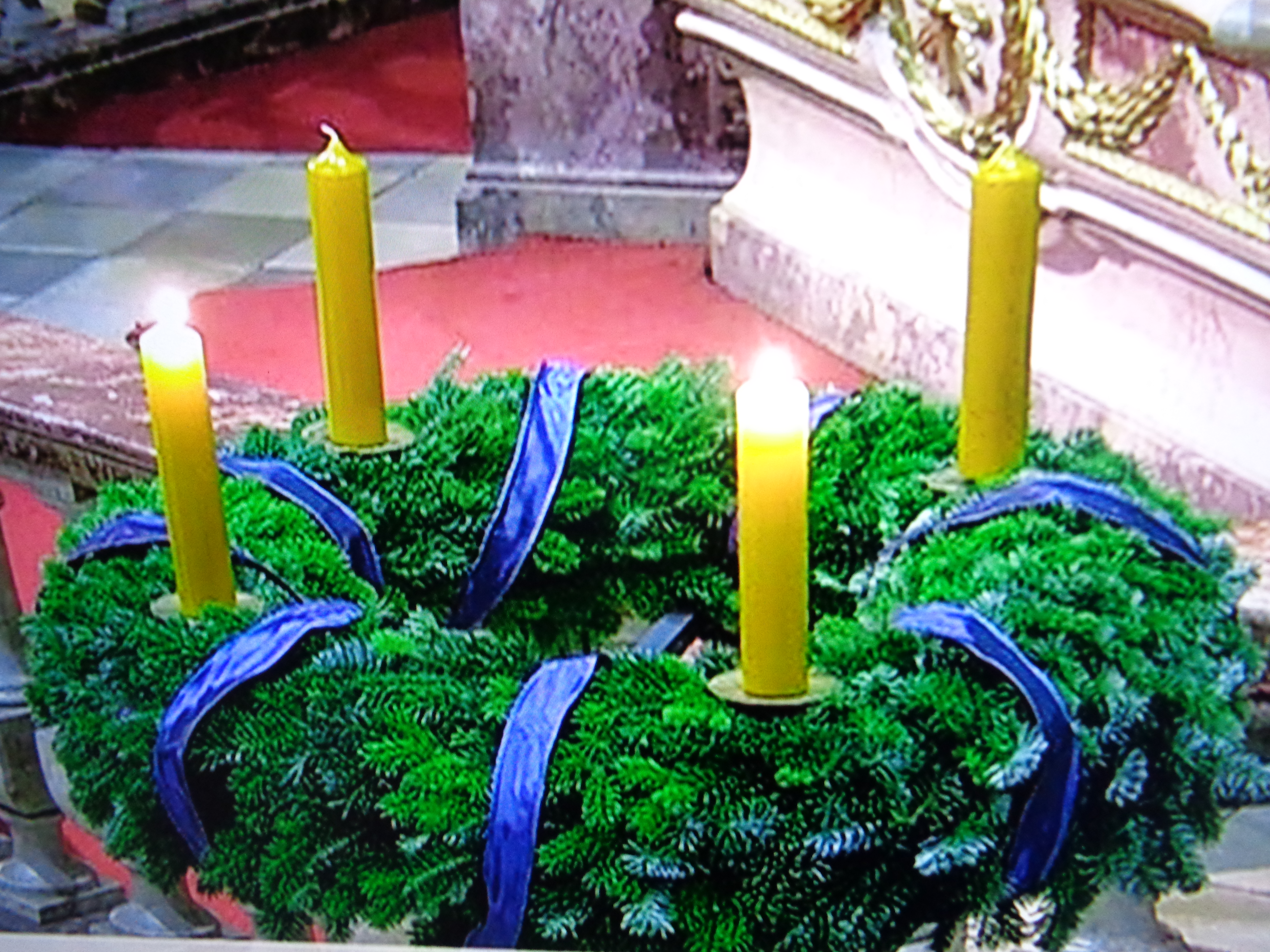
Advent wreath in the pilgrimage church Maria im Sand in Dettelbach, Bavaria

The Advent wreath, or Advent crown, is a Christian tradition that symbolizes the passage of the four weeks of Advent in the liturgical calendar of the Western church. It is traditionally a Lutheran practice, although it has spread to many other Christian denominations.

It is an evergreen wreath with four candles, sometimes with a fifth, white candle in the center. Beginning with the First Sunday of Advent, the lighting of a candle can be accompanied by a Bible reading, devotional time and prayers. An additional candle is lit on each subsequent Sunday until, by the last Sunday of Advent, all four candles are lit. Some Advent wreaths include a fifth, Christ candle which is lit on Christmas Eve or Christmas Day. The custom originated in family settings but has also become widespread in public worship.

== History ==
The concept of the Advent wreath originated among German Lutherans in the 16th century. However, it was not until three centuries later that the modern Advent wreath took shape.

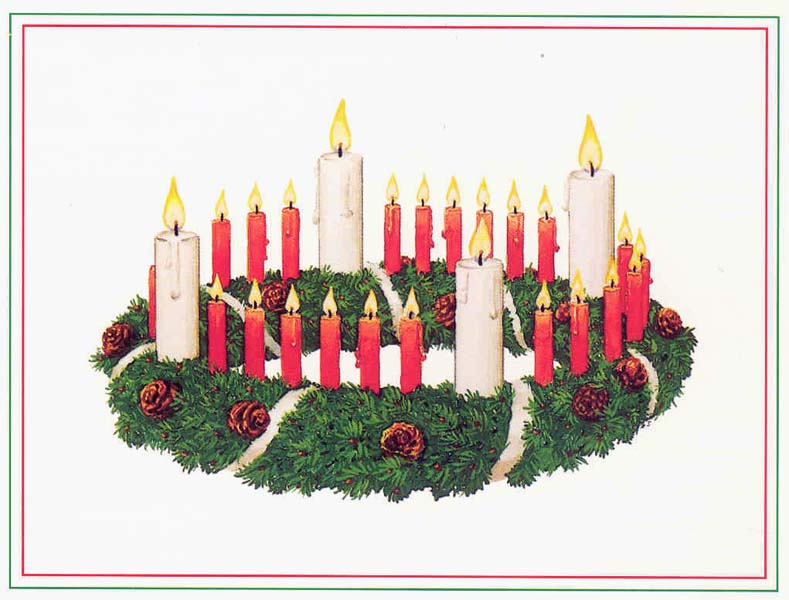
Advent wreath as designed by Johann Hinrich Wichern

Research by Mary Jane Haemig of Luther Seminary, St. Paul, Minnesota, points to Johann Hinrich Wichern (1808–1881), a Lutheran pastor in Germany and a pioneer in urban mission work among the poor, as the inventor of the modern Advent wreath. During Advent, children at the mission school Rauhes Haus, founded by Wichern in Hamburg, would ask daily if Christmas had arrived. In 1839, he took a large wooden ring from an old cartwheel and decorated it with 24 small red candles and four large white candles. One small candle was lit successively every weekday and Saturday during Advent, and a large white candle was lit each Sunday. The custom gained ground among Protestant churches in Germany and evolved into the smaller wreath with four or five candles known today. Roman Catholics in Germany began to adopt the custom in the 1920s, and in the 1930s it spread to North America. Haemig's research also indicates that the custom did not reach the United States until the 1930s, even among German Lutheran immigrants.

In medieval times, Advent was a period of fasting during which people's thoughts were directed to the expected second coming of Christ; but in modern times many have forgotten this meaning and it has instead been primarily seen as the lead up to Christmas, and in that context the Advent wreath serves as a reminder of the approach of the feast.

In 1964, an Advent crown, made at home from wire coathangers and tinsel, appeared on the BBC's bi-weekly children's TV program Blue Peter. This "make" became one of the program's most iconic features, repeated each year, and was the introduction of this tradition to most of the broadly Anglican audience. In later years, the candles were replaced by baubles, out of concern for fire safety.

More recently, some Eastern Orthodox families have adopted an Advent wreath with six candles, symbolizing the longer Christmas fast in Orthodox tradition, which corresponds to Advent in Western Christianity.

== Christian symbolism in the Advent wreath ==
Advent wreaths are circular, representing God's infinite love, and are usually made of evergreen leaves, which "represent the hope of eternal life brought by Jesus Christ". Within the Advent wreath are candles that generally represent the four weeks of the Advent season as well as "the light of God coming into the world through the birth of Jesus Christ" although each of the candles can be attributed its own significance as well. The four candles of the Advent wreath specifically symbolize the Christian concepts of hope, peace, joy and love, with these candles being lit subsequently throughout each week of the Advent season. Some Advent wreaths also have a white candle in the center, known as the 'Christ candle', to symbolize the arrival of Christmastide. (Others omit the use of the Christ Candle as to not confuse it with the Paschal candle, and remove the wreath at the conclusion of the Advent season.) It is first lit on Christmas Eve, the beginning of Christmastide, and may be lit throughout the rest of the Christmas season, as well as during Epiphanytide. The Christ candle is white because this is the traditional festal color in the Western Church. An additional layer of meaning names the first candle as the Messiah or Prophecy candle (representing the Jewish prophets who predicted the coming of Jesus), the second is the Bethlehem candle (representing the journey of Joseph and Mary), the third represents the shepherds and their joy, and the fourth is the Angel's candle, representing peace.

In many Catholic and Protestant churches, the most popular colors for the four surrounding Advent candles are violet (or blue) and rose, corresponding with the colors of the liturgical vestments for the Sundays of Advent. For denominations of the Western Christian Church, violet is the historic liturgical color for three of the four Sundays of Advent as it is the traditional color of penitential seasons; blue has been historically used too, as it represents hopefulness, reflective of the theme of Advent surrounding the First Coming of Jesus and Second Coming of Jesus. Rose is the liturgical color for the Third Sunday of Advent, known as Gaudete Sunday (from the Latin word meaning "rejoice ye", the first word of the introit of this Sunday); it is a pause in the penitential spirit of Advent. As such, the third candle, representing joy, is often a different color from the other three.

In other Protestant churches, especially in the United Kingdom, it is more common for Advent wreaths to have four red candles (reflecting their traditional use in Christmas decorations). An Advent wreath given to Pope Benedict XVI of the Catholic Church also had four red candles. In the UK, the four red Advent candles are often linked to the Sunday Revised Common Lectionary readings for Advent, each candle representing those looking forward to the coming of Christ: the hope of all God's people (week one), the Old Testament prophets (week two), John the Baptist (week three) and Mary the mother of Jesus (week four).

In Making God Real in the Orthodox Christian Home, Anthony Coniaris states that an Eastern Christian wreath consists of six different colored candles on a round base to celebrate the six weeks of the 40-day Advent and Christmas period. A green candle, symbolizing faith, is lit on the first Sunday that begins on November 15; on the second Sunday, a blue candle, symbolizing hope, is lit; on the third Sunday, a gold candle, symbolizing love; on the fourth Sunday, a white candle, symbolizing peace; on the fifth Sunday, a purple candle, symbolizing repentance; on the sixth Sunday, a red candle, symbolizing communion.

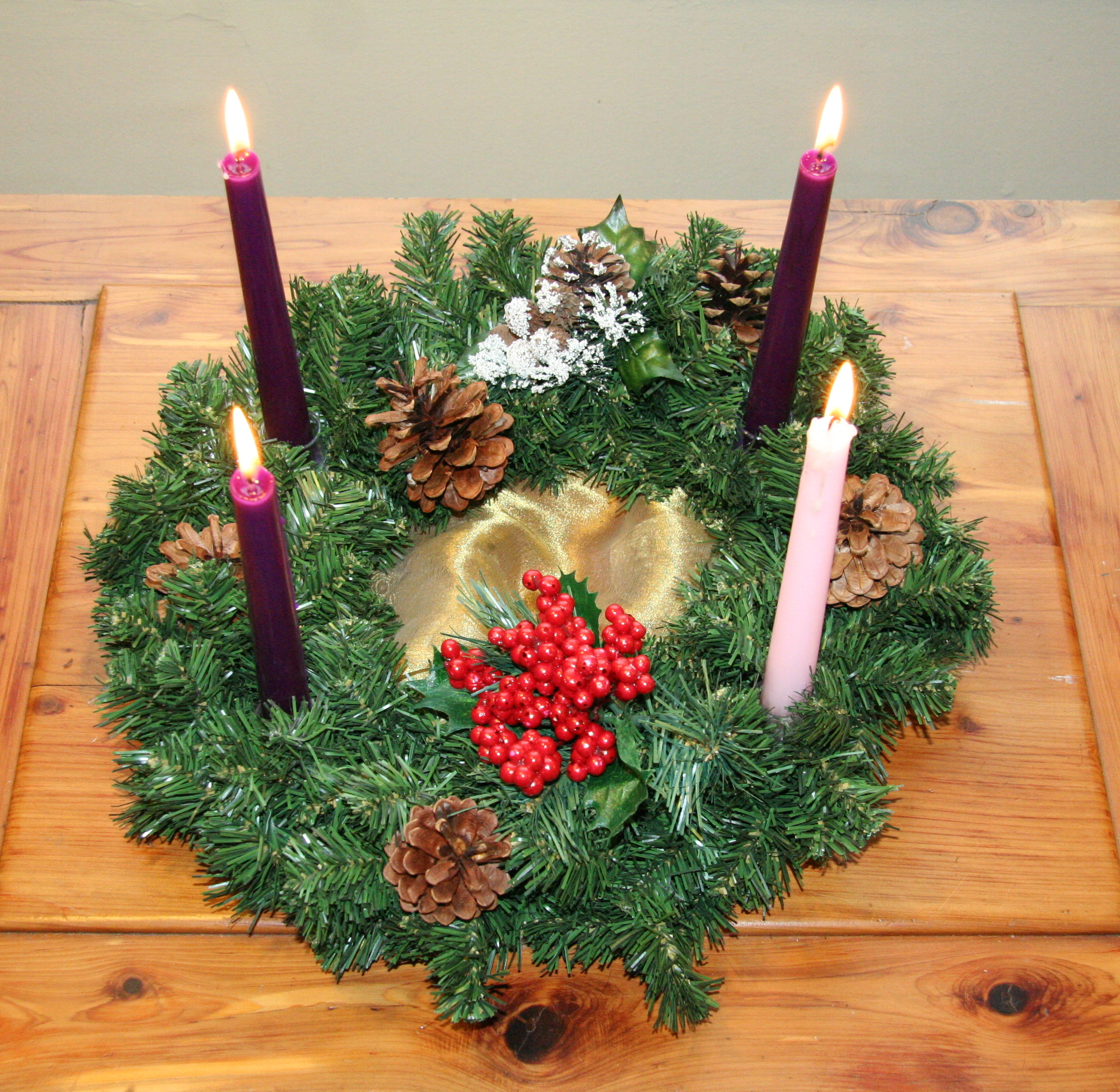
Advent wreath with three purple candles and one rose candle for Gaudete

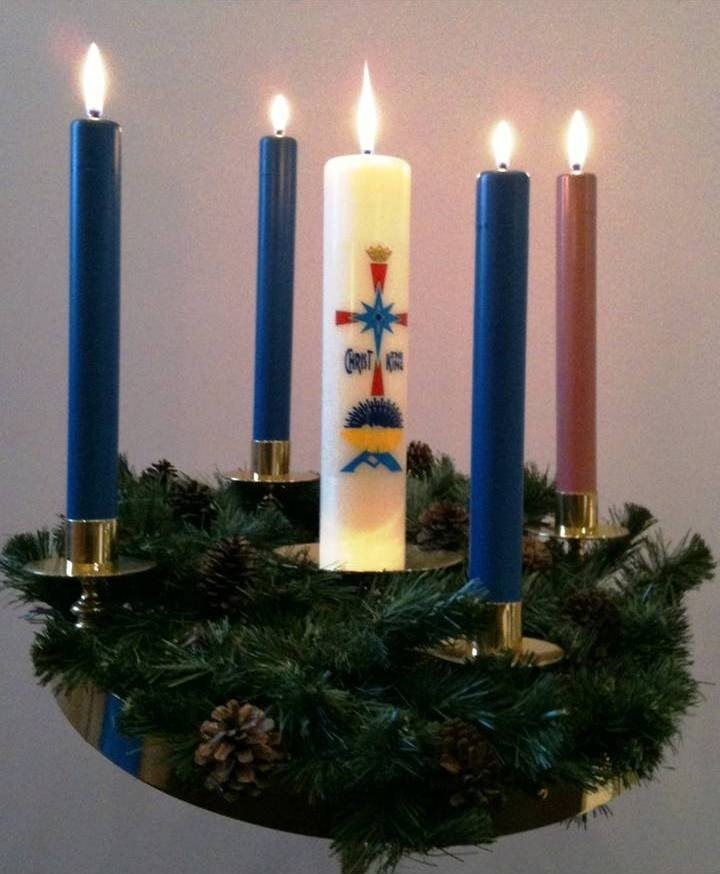
Advent wreath with a Christ candle in the center

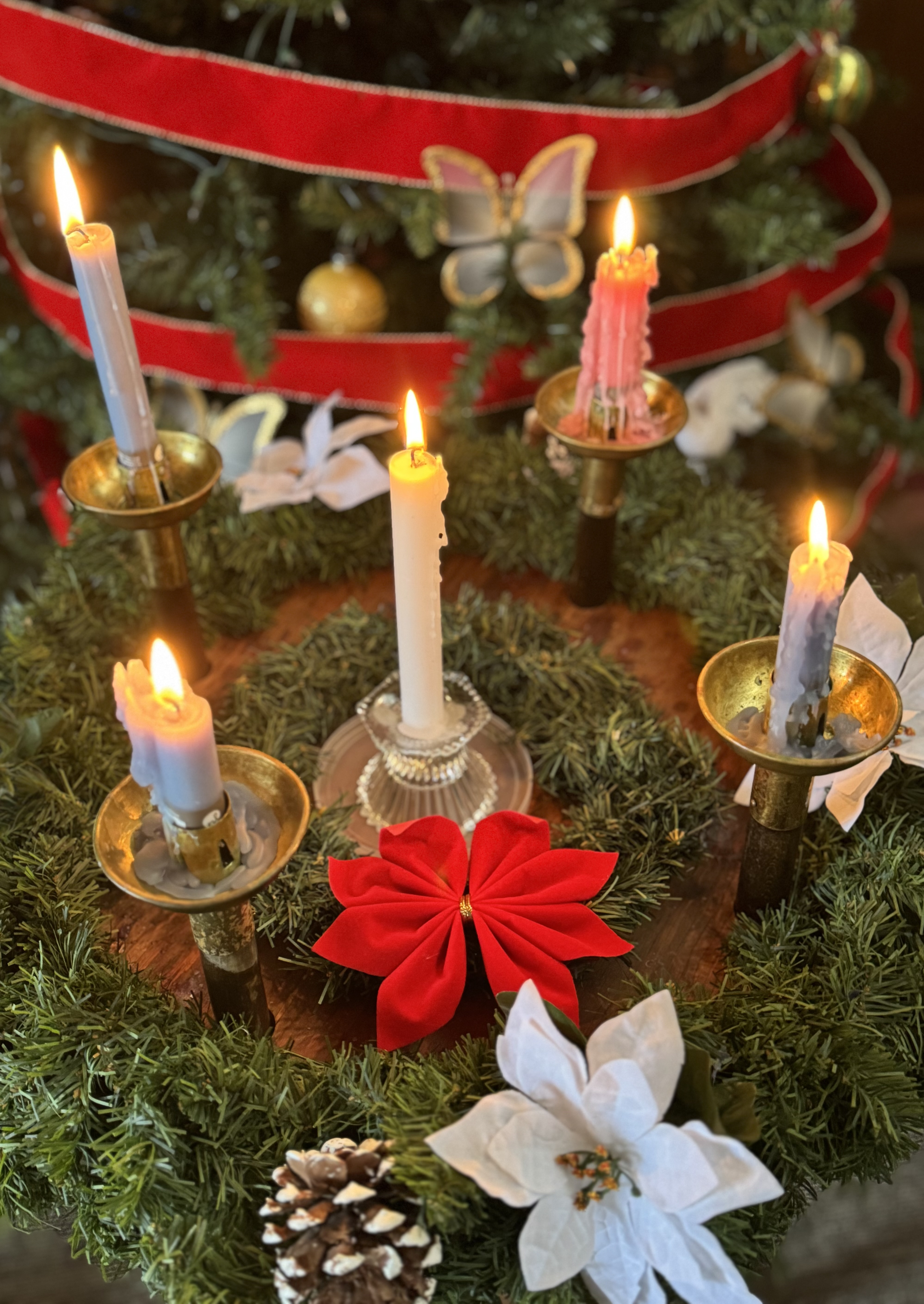
Advent wreath with one rose candle and three blue ones, plus a central white one

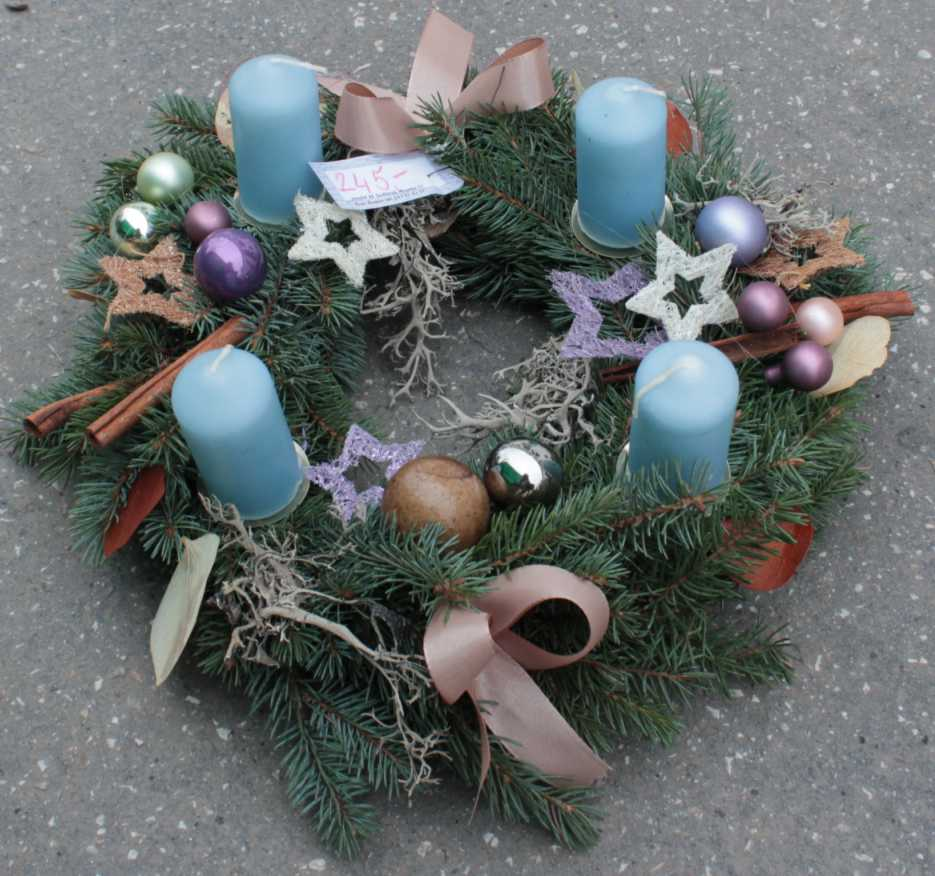
Advent wreath, Czech Republic

== See also ==
- Advent calendar
- Chrismon tree
- Christingle
- Daily devotional
