= Advent =

Christian church season preceding Christmas

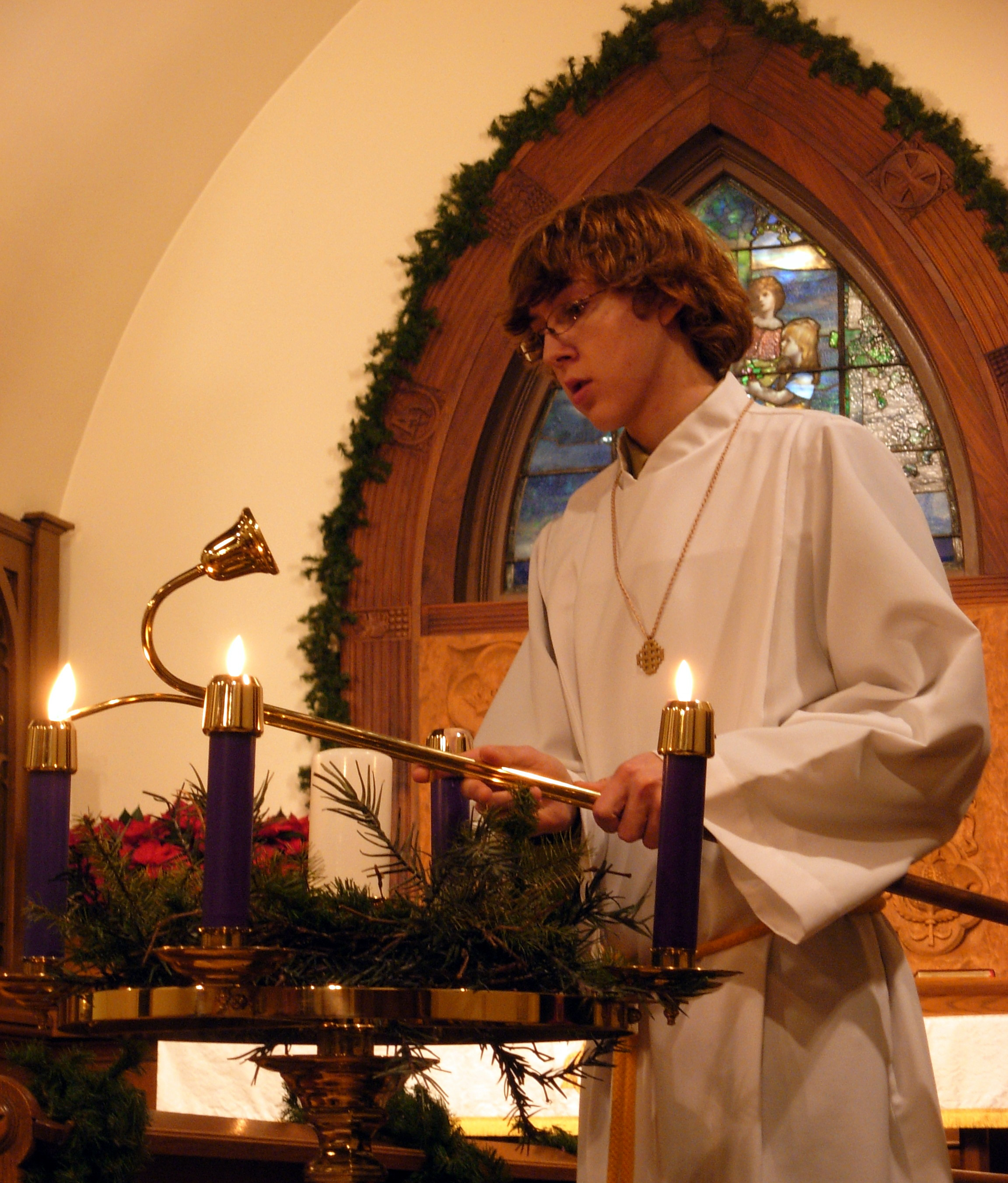
- Lighting the candles of an Advent wreath in a church service
- Observed by: Christians
- Type: Christian, cultural
- Significance: Preparation for the Second Coming and commemoration of the birth of Jesus
- Observances: Church services, completing an Advent calendar and Advent wreath, praying through a daily devotional, erecting a Chrismon tree, hanging of the greens, lighting a Christingle, gift giving, family and other social gatherings
- Begins: Fourth (or, in the Ambrosian and Mozarabic Rites, sixth) Sunday before Christmas
- 2025 date: 30 November; 16 November (Ambrosian and Mozarabic Rites)
- 2026 date: 29 November; 15 November (Ambrosian and Mozarabic Rites)
- 2027 date: 28 November; 14 November (Ambrosian and Mozarabic Rites)
- 2028 date: 3 December; 19 November (Ambrosian and Mozarabic Rites)
- Duration: 22–28 days
- Frequency: Annual
- Related to: Christmastide, Christmas Eve, Annunciation, Epiphany, Epiphanytide, Baptism of the Lord, Nativity Fast, Nativity of Jesus

Advent is a season observed in most Christian denominations as a time of waiting and preparation for both the celebration of Jesus's birth at Christmas and Jesus's return at the Second Coming. It begins on the fourth Sunday before Christmas, often referred to as Advent Sunday. Advent is the beginning of the liturgical year in Western Christianity. The name comes from Latin adventus ('coming; arrival'), translating the Greek parousia from the New Testament, originally referring to the Second Coming.

The season of Advent in the Christian calendar anticipates the "coming of Christ" from three different perspectives: the physical nativity in Bethlehem, the reception of Christ in the heart of the believer, and the eschatological Second Coming. (Note: "since the time of Bernard of Clairvaux (d. 1153), Christians have spoken of the three comings of Christ: In the flesh in Bethlehem, in our hearts daily, and in glory at the end of time".)

Practices associated with Advent include Advent calendars, lighting the candles of an Advent wreath, (Note: The use of a five-candle Advent wreath involves lighting an additional candle every Sunday and lighting a center Christ candle on Christmas.) praying an Advent daily devotional, erecting a Chrismon tree, lighting a Christingle, as well as other ways of preparing for Christmas, such as setting up Christmas decorations, a custom that is sometimes done liturgically through a hanging of the greens ceremony.

The analogue of Advent in Eastern Christianity is called the Nativity Fast, but it differs in meaning, length, and observances, and does not begin the liturgical church year as it does in the West. The Eastern Nativity Fast does not use the term parousia in its preparatory services.

== Dates ==
In the Anglican, Lutheran, Moravian, Presbyterian, and Methodist calendars, Advent begins on the fourth Sunday before Christmas (the Sunday that falls on or closest to 30 November, always between 27 November and 3 December; it is the Sunday between the last Thursday of November and the first Thursday of December), and ends by Christmas Eve on 24 December. In the Roman Rite of the Catholic Church, Advent begins with the First Vespers of the First Sunday of Advent and ends with the Deus, in adiutorium of the First Vespers of Christmas. The first day of Advent also begins a new liturgical year.

In the Ambrosian Rite and the Mozarabic Rite of the Catholic Church, Advent begins on the sixth Sunday before Christmas (the Sunday that falls on or closest to 16 November, always between 13 November and 19 November; it is the Sunday before the third Tuesday of November).

== Significance ==
For Western Christians of the Catholic, Lutheran and Anglican traditions, Advent signifies preparation for a threefold coming of Christ: firstly in the Incarnation at Bethlehem, then in a perpetual sacramental presence in the Eucharist, and thirdly at his Second Coming and final judgement. Furthermore, Advent is a time to focus on his present coming to mankind in the Word and Sacraments.

Historically, Advent had a connection with the so-called Four last things which has largely lost its importance in popular practice.

== History ==
It is not known when the period of preparation for Christmas that is now called Advent began, though it was certainly in existence from about 480; the novelty introduced by the Council of Tours of 567 was to order monks to fast every day in the month of December until Christmas. According to J. Neil Alexander, it is "impossible to claim with confidence a credible explanation of the origin of Advent".

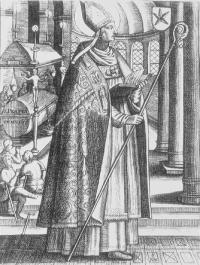
A representation of Saint Perpetuus

Associated with Advent as a time of penitence was a period of fasting, known also as St Martin's Lent or the Nativity Fast. According to Saint Gregory of Tours the celebration of Advent began in the fifth century when the Bishop Perpetuus directed that starting with the St. Martin's Day on 11 November until Christmas, one fasts three times per week; this is why Advent was sometimes also named "Lent of St. Martin". This practice remained limited to the diocese of Tours until the sixth century.

The Council of Macon held in 581 adopted the practice in Tours. Soon all France observed three days of fasting a week from the feast of Saint Martin until Christmas. The most devout worshipers in some countries exceeded the requirements adopted by the council, and fasted every day of Advent.

The first clear references in the Western Church to Advent occur in the Gelasian Sacramentary, which provides Advent Collects, Epistles, and Gospels for the five Sundays preceding Christmas and for the corresponding Wednesdays and Fridays. The homilies of Gregory the Great in the late sixth century showed four weeks to the liturgical season of Advent, but without the observance of a fast. Under Charlemagne in the ninth century, writings claim that the fast was still widely observed.

In the 13th century, the fast of Advent was not commonly practised although, according to Durand of Mende, fasting was still generally observed. As quoted in the bull of canonisation of St. Louis, the zeal with which he observed this fast was no longer a custom observed by Christians of great piety. It was then limited to the period from the feast of Saint Andrew until Christmas Day, since the solemnity of this apostle was more universal than that of St. Martin.

When Pope Urban V ascended the papal seat in 1362, he imposed abstinence on the papal court but there was no mention of fasting. It was then customary in Rome to observe five weeks of Advent before Christmas. The Ambrosian Rite has six. The Greeks show no more real consistency: Advent was an optional fast that some begin on 15 November, while others begin on 6 December or only a few days before Christmas.

The liturgy of Advent remained unchanged until the Second Vatican Council introduced minor changes, differentiating the spirit of Lent from that of Advent, emphasising Advent as a season of hope for Christ's coming now as a promise of his Second Coming.

== Traditions ==
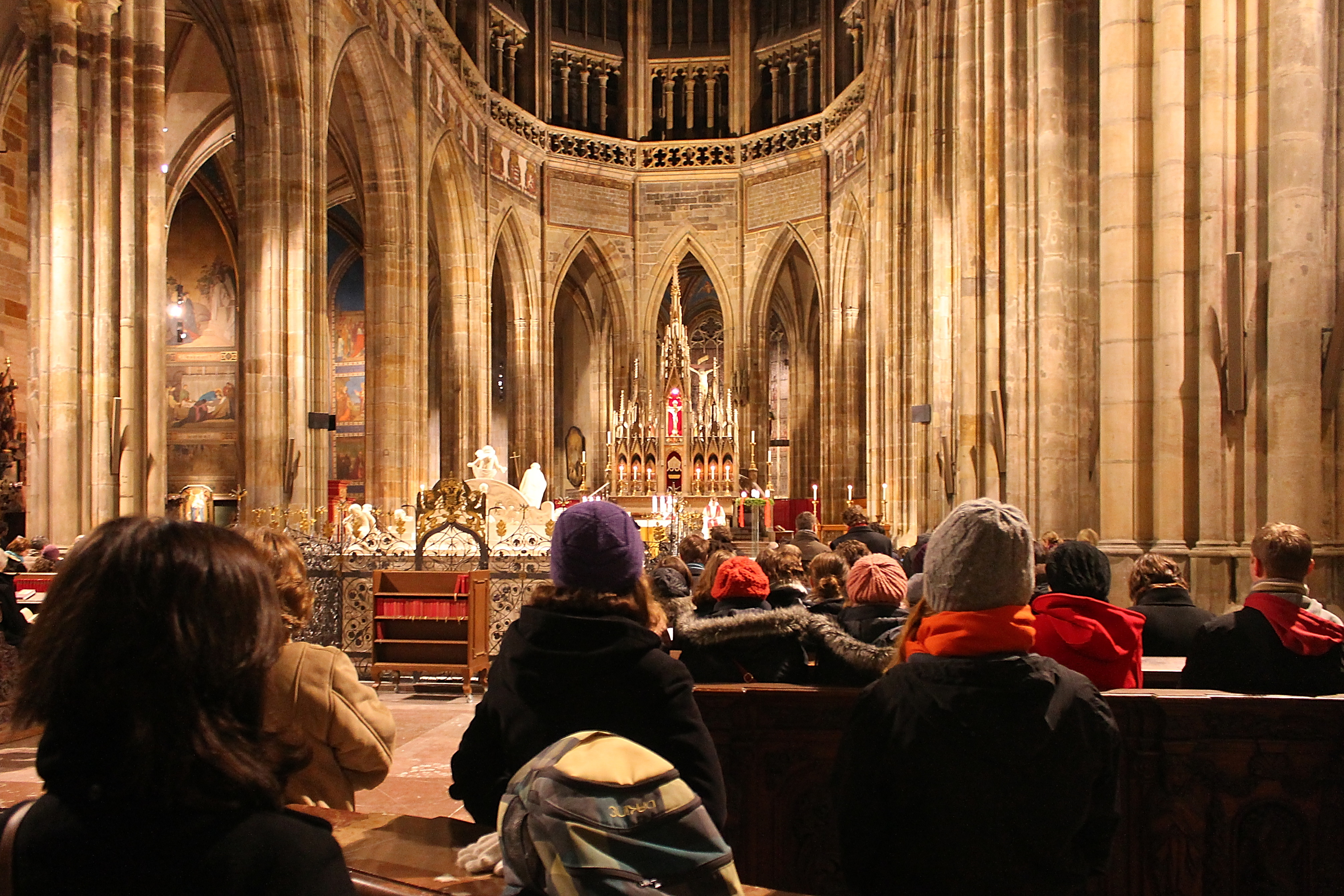
Rorate Mass in Prague Cathedral, Czech Republic

The theme of readings and teachings during Advent is often the preparation for the Second Coming and the Last Judgment. While the Sunday readings relate to the first coming of Jesus Christ as saviour as well as to his Second Coming as judge, traditions vary in the relative importance of penitence and expectation during the weeks in Advent.

=== Liturgical colour ===
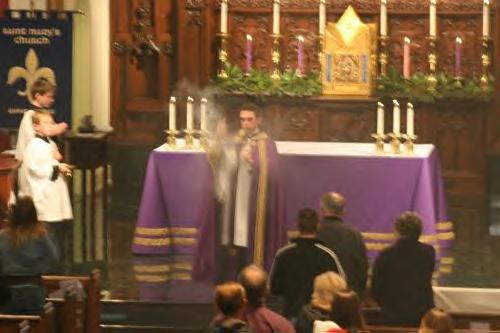
Celebration of a Advent vespers. Cope and antependium are violet, the liturgical colour of Advent in the Roman Rite.

Since approximately the 13th century, the usual liturgical colour in Western Christianity for Advent has been violet; Pope Innocent III declared black to be the proper colour for Advent, though Durandus of Saint-Pourçain claims violet has preference over black. The violet or purple colour is often used for antependia, the vestments of the clergy, and often also the tabernacle. On the third Sunday of Advent, Gaudete Sunday, rose may be used instead, referencing the rose used on Laetare Sunday, the fourth Sunday of Lent. A rose-coloured candle in Western Christianity is referenced as a sign of joy (Gaudete) lit on the third Sunday of Advent.

While the traditional colour for Advent is violet, there is a growing interest in and acceptance, by some Christian denominations of blue as an alternative liturgical colour for Advent, a custom traced to the usage of the Church of Sweden (Lutheran) and the Mozarabic Rite, which dates from the 8th century.

The Lutheran Book of Worship lists blue as the preferred colour for Advent, while the Methodist Book of Worship and the Presbyterian Book of Common Worship identify purple or blue as appropriate for Advent. Proponents of this new liturgical trend argue that purple is traditionally associated with solemnity and somberness, which is fitting to the repentant character of Lent. There has been an increasing trend in Protestant churches to supplant purple with blue during Advent as it is a hopeful season of preparation that anticipates both Bethlehem and the consummation of history in the Second Coming of Jesus Christ. This colour is often called "Sarum blue", referring to its purported use at Salisbury Cathedral. Many of the ornaments and ceremonial practices associated with the Sarum rite were revived in the Anglican Communion in the late 19th and early 20th centuries, as part of the Anglo-Catholic Oxford Movement in the Church of England. While Anglican liturgist Percy Dearmer does not object to the use of blue during Advent, he did not attribute its use to Sarum. "[T]he so-called Sarum uses are really one-half made up from the fancy of nineteenth-century ritualists."

While the Sarum use was influential, different dioceses, including Salisbury, used a variety of coloured vestments. "In the Sarum Rite the Advent colour was red, but it could very well have been the red-purple known as murray ..."

The Roman Catholic Church retains the traditional violet. Blue is not generally used in Latin Catholicism, and where it does regionally, it has nothing to do with Advent specifically, but with veneration of the Blessed Virgin. However, on some occasions that are heavily associated with Advent, such as the Rorate Mass (but not on Sundays), white is used.

During the Nativity Fast, red is used by Eastern Christianity, although gold is an alternative colour.

=== Music ===
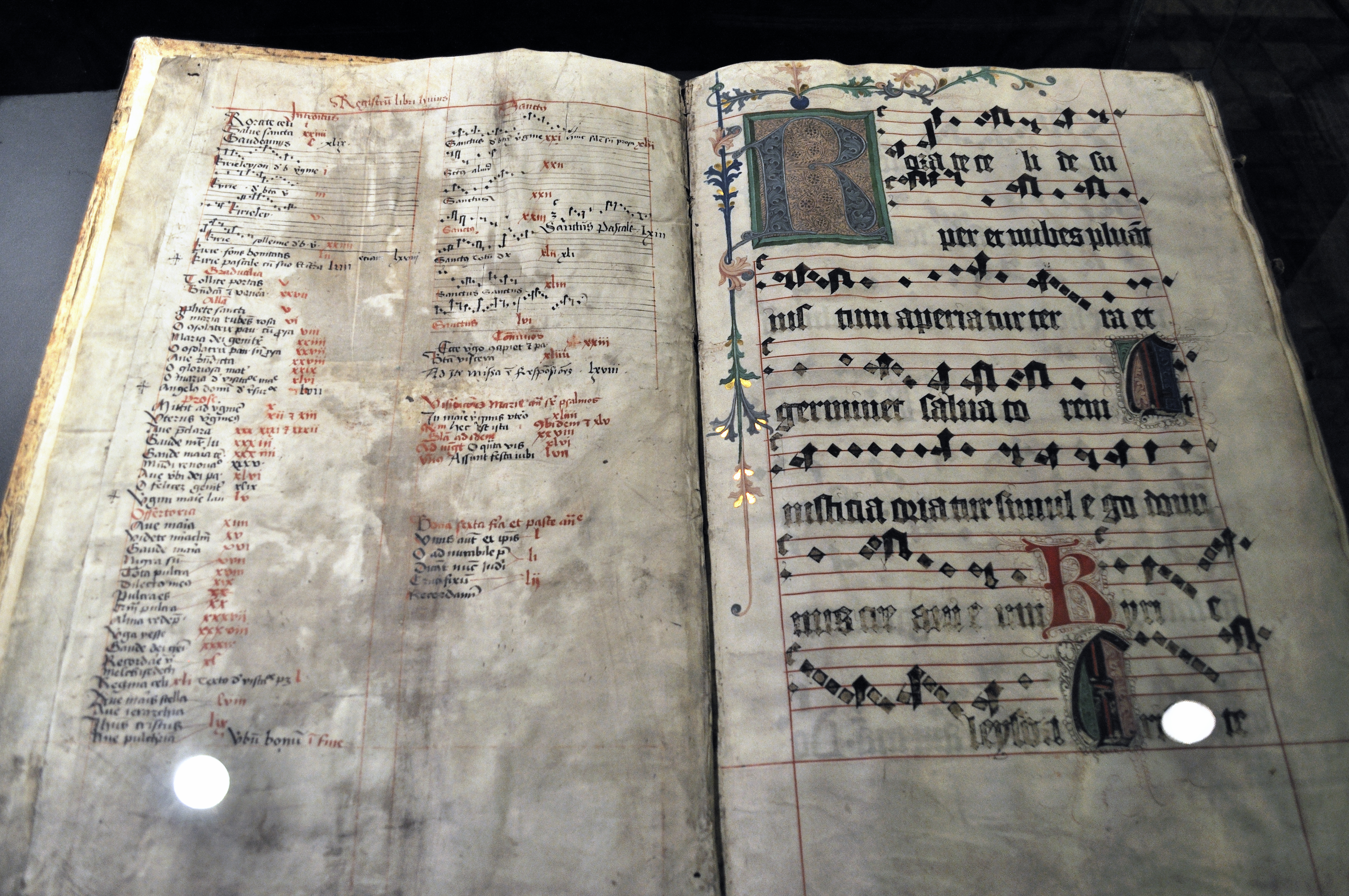
Medieval manuscript of Gregorian chant setting of "Rorate Coeli"

Many churches hold special musical events, such as Nine Lessons and Carols and singing of Handel's Messiah oratorio. The Advent Prose, an antiphonal plainsong, may be sung. The "Late Advent Weekdays", 17–24 December, mark the singing of the Great Advent 'O antiphons'. These are the daily antiphons for the Magnificat at Vespers, Evensong, or Evening Prayer, in the Roman Catholic, Anglican, and Lutheran churches, and mark the forthcoming birth of the Messiah. They form the basis for each verse of the popular Advent hymn "O come, O come, Emmanuel".

German songs for Advent include "Es kommt ein Schiff, geladen" from the 15th century and "O Heiland, reiß die Himmel auf", published in 1622. Johann Sebastian Bach composed several cantatas for Advent in Weimar, from Nun komm, der Heiden Heiland, BWV 61, to Herz und Mund und Tat und Leben, BWV 147a, but only one more in Leipzig where he worked for the longest time, because there Advent was a silent time which allowed cantata music only on the first of the four Sundays.

During Advent, the Gloria of the Mass is omitted, so that the return of the angels' song at Christmas has an effect of novelty. Mass compositions written especially for Lent, such as Michael Haydn's Missa tempore Quadragesimae, in D minor for choir and organ, have no Gloria and so are appropriate for use in Advent.

=== Fasting ===
Bishop Perpetuus of Tours, who died in 490, ordered fasting three days a week from the day after Saint Martin's Day (11 November). In the 6th century, local councils enjoined fasting on all days except Saturdays and Sundays from Saint Martin's Day to Epiphany (the feast of baptism), a period of 56 days, but of 40 days fasting, like the fast of Lent. It was therefore called Quadragesima Sancti Martini (Saint Martin's Lent). This period of fasting was later shortened and called "Advent" by the Church.

In the Anglican and Lutheran churches this fasting rule was later relaxed. The Roman Catholic Church later abolished the precept of fasting during Advent (at an unknown date at the latest in 1917), later, but kept Advent as a season of penitence. In addition to fasting, dancing and similar festivities were forbidden in these traditions. On Gaudete Sunday, relaxation of the fast was permitted. Eastern Orthodox and Oriental Orthodox churches still hold the tradition of fasting for 40 days before Christmas.

=== Local rites ===
In England, especially in the northern counties, there was a custom (now extinct) for poor women to carry around the "Advent images", two dolls dressed to represent Jesus and the Blessed Virgin Mary. A halfpenny coin was expected from every one to whom these were exhibited and bad luck was thought to menace the household not visited by the doll-bearers before Christmas Eve at the latest.

In Normandy, farmers employed children under twelve to run through the fields and orchards armed with torches, setting fire to bundles of straw, and thus, it was believed, driving out such vermin as were likely to damage the crops.

In Italy, among other Advent celebrations, is the entry into Rome in the last days of Advent of the Calabrian pifferari, or bagpipe players, who play before the shrines of Mary, the mother of Jesus: in Italian tradition, the shepherds played these pipes when they came to the manger at Bethlehem to pay homage to the infant Jesus.

In recent times, the most common observance of Advent outside church circles has been the keeping of an Advent calendar or Advent candle, with one door being opened in the calendar, or one section of the candle being burned, on each day in December leading up to Christmas Eve. In many countries, the first day of Advent often heralds the start of the Christmas season, with many people opting to erect their Christmas trees and Christmas decorations on or immediately before Advent Sunday.

Since 2011, an Advent labyrinth consisting of 2,500 tealights has been formed for the third Saturday of Advent in Frankfurt-Bornheim.

== Advent wreath ==
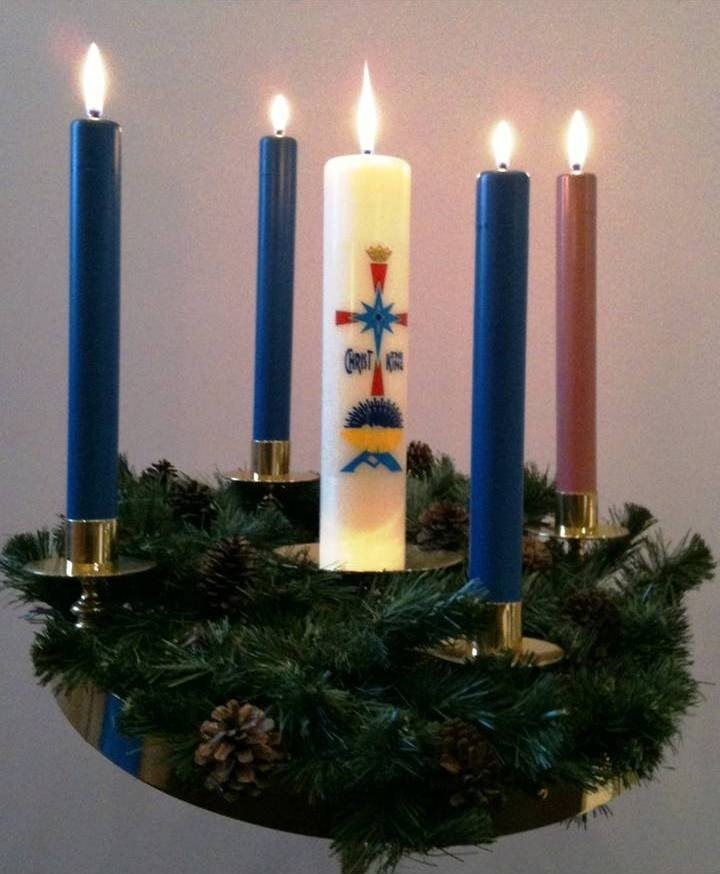
An Advent wreath with three blue candles and one rose candle surrounding a central Christ candle

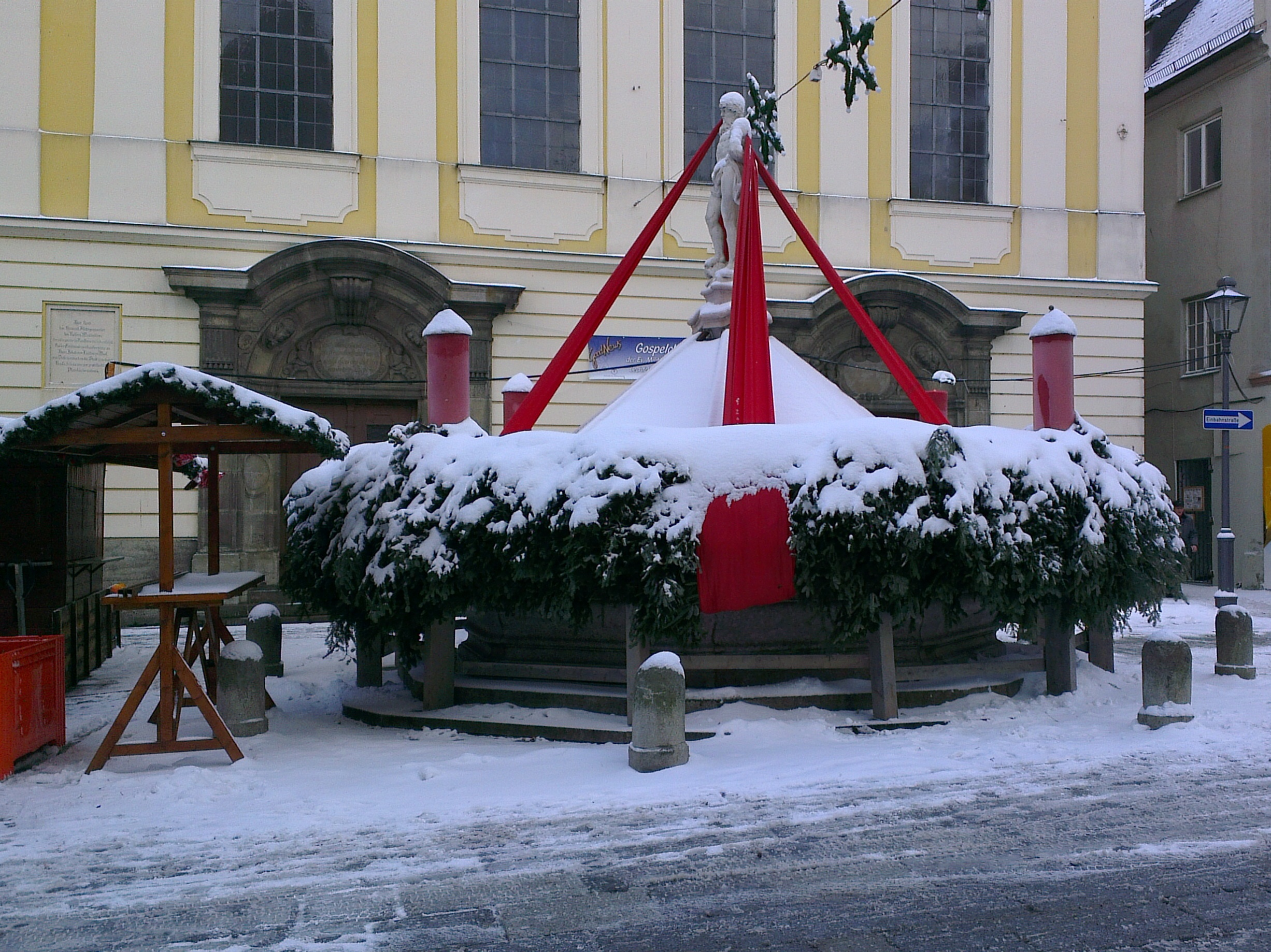
A giant Advent wreath in Kaufbeuren, Bavaria, Germany

The keeping of an Advent wreath is a common practice in homes or churches. The concept of the Advent wreath originated among German Lutherans in the 16th century. However, it was not until three centuries later that the modern Advent wreath took shape. (Note: The first clear association with Advent is generally attributed to German Lutherans in the 16th century. However, another three centuries would pass before the modern Advent wreath took shape. Specifically, a German theologian and educator by the name of Johann Hinrich Wichern (1808–1881) is credited with the idea of lighting an increasing number of candles as Christmas approached.)

The modern Advent wreath, with its candles representing the Sundays of Advent, originated from an 1839 initiative by Johann Hinrich Wichern, a Protestant pastor in Germany and a pioneer in urban mission work among the poor. To deal with the impatience of the children awaiting Christmas, whom he was teaching, Wichern made a ring of wood, with 19 small red tapers and four large white candles. Every morning a small candle was lit, and every Sunday a large candle. Modern practice only retains the large candles.

The wreath crown is traditionally made of fir tree branches knotted with a red ribbon and decorated with pine cones, holly, laurel, and sometimes mistletoe. It is also an ancient symbol signifying several things; first of all, the crown symbolises victory, in addition to its round form evoking the sun and its return each year. The number four represents the four Sundays of Advent, and the green twigs are a sign of life and hope.

The fir tree is a symbol of strength and laurel a symbol of victory over sin and suffering. The latter two, with the holly, do not lose their leaves, and thus represent the eternity of God. The flames of candles are the representation of the Christmas light approaching and bringing hope and peace, as well as the symbol of the struggle against darkness. For Christians, this crown is also the symbol of Christ the King, the holly recalling the crown of thorns resting on the head of Christ.

The Advent wreath is adorned with candles, usually three violet or purple and one pink; the pink candle is lit on the Third Sunday of Advent, called "Gaudete Sunday" after the opening word, Gaudete, meaning 'Rejoice', of the entrance antiphon at Mass. Some add a fifth candle (white), known as the "Christ candle", in the middle of the wreath, to be lit on Christmas Eve or Christmas Day.

The candles symbolize, in one interpretation, the great stages of salvation before the coming of the Messiah; the first is the symbol of the forgiveness granted to Adam and Eve, the second is the symbol of the faith of Abraham and of the patriarchs who believe in the gift of the Promised Land, the third is the symbol of the joy of David whose lineage does not stop and also testifies to his covenant with God, and the fourth and last candle is the symbol of the teaching of the prophets who announce a reign of justice and peace. Alternatively, they symbolize the four stages of human history; creation, the Incarnation, the redemption of sins, and the Last Judgment.

In Orthodox churches there are sometimes wreaths with six candles, in line with the six-week duration of the Nativity Fast/Advent.

In Sweden, white candles, symbol of festivity and purity, are used in celebrating Saint Lucy's Day, 13 December, which always falls within Advent.

== Four Sundays ==
Dates for the four Sundays of Advent 2022–2030
Year	1st	2nd	3rd	4th
2022	27 November	4 December	11 December	18 December
2023	3 December	10 December	17 December	24 December
2024	1 December	8 December	15 December	22 December
2025	30 November	7 December	14 December	21 December
2026	29 November	6 December	13 December	20 December
2027	28 November	5 December	12 December	19 December
2028	3 December	10 December	17 December	24 December
2029	2 December	9 December	16 December	23 December
2030	1 December	8 December	15 December	22 December

=== Roman Catholic Church ===
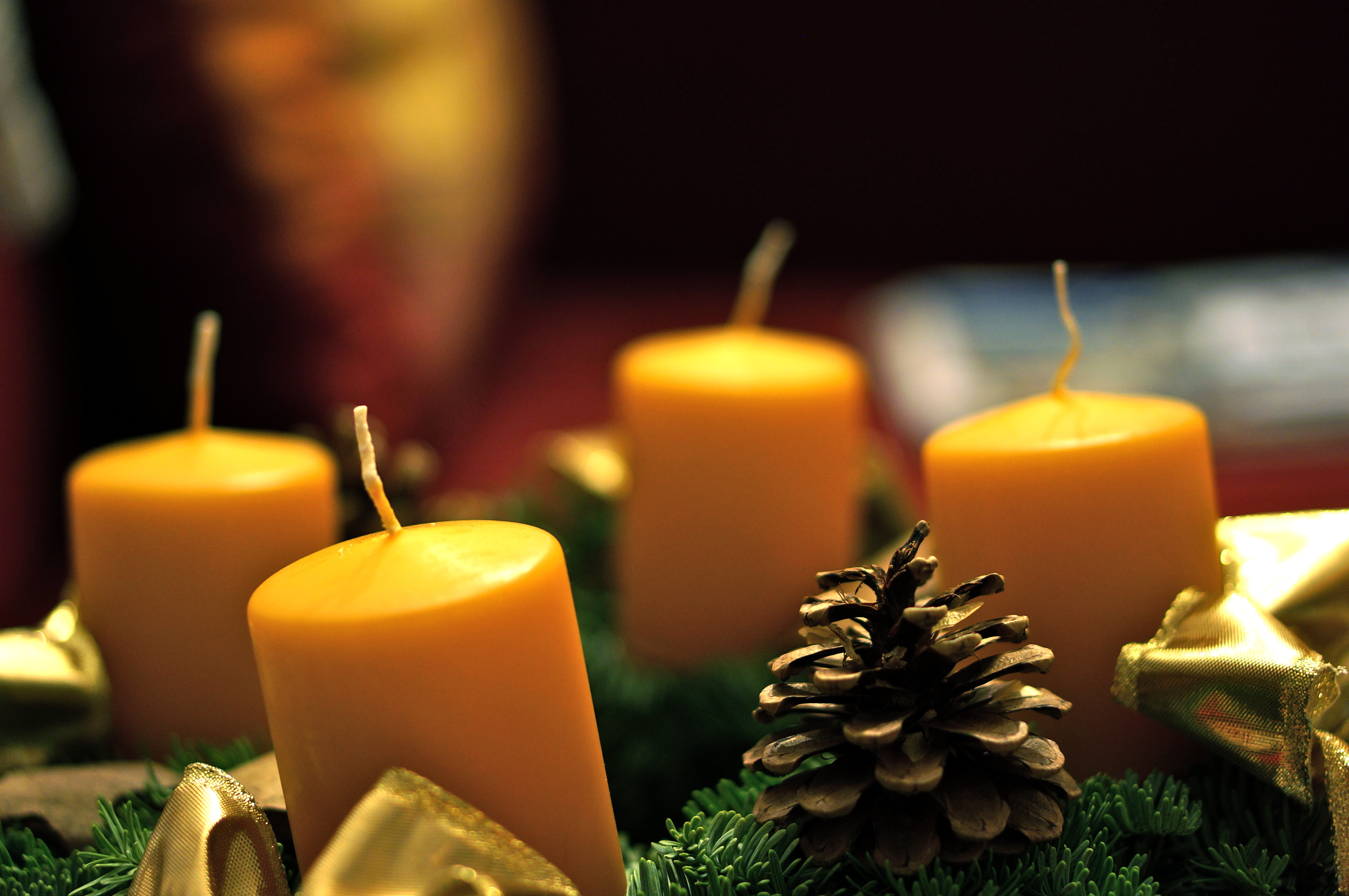
Advent candles

In the Roman Rite of the Catholic Church, the readings of Mass on the Sundays of Advent have distinct themes:

- First Sunday in Advent: On the First Sunday (Advent Sunday), they look forward to the Second Coming of Christ.
- Second Sunday in Advent: On the Second Sunday, the Gospel reading recalls the preaching of John the Baptist, who came to "prepare the way of the Lord"; the other readings have associated themes. The Catholic Church in England and Wales treats this Sunday as "Bible Sunday", reflecting a call by Pope Francis to have one Sunday in the year "given over entirely to the word of God, so as to appreciate the inexhaustible riches contained in that constant dialogue between the Lord and his people".
- Third Sunday in Advent: On the Third Sunday ("Gaudete Sunday"), the Gospel reading is again about John the Baptist, the other readings about the joy associated with the coming of the Saviour.
- Fourth Sunday in Advent: On the Fourth Sunday, the Gospel reading concerns the events involving Mary and Joseph that led directly to the birth of Jesus, while the other readings are related to these.

=== Anglican, Lutheran, Presbyterian, and Methodist traditions ===
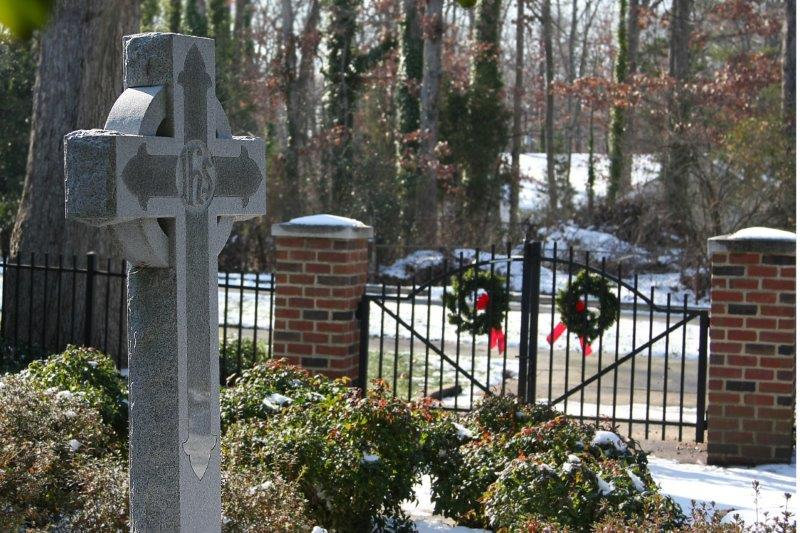
Celtic cross in memorial garden, Bon Air Presbyterian Church, Virginia, with Advent wreaths decorating the gates

A variety of practices derived from the Roman rite are observed in various protestant churches which retain similar liturgical practices.

- Last Sunday before Advent: In the Roman Catholic Church since 1969, and in most Anglican churches since at least 2000, the Sunday before Advent (the final Sunday of the liturgical year) is celebrated as the Feast of Christ the King. This feast is now also widely observed in many Protestant churches, sometimes as the Reign of Christ.
- First Sunday in Advent: The readings for the first Sunday in Advent relate to the Old Testament patriarchs who were Christ's ancestors, so some call the first Advent candle that of hope.
- Second Sunday in Advent: The readings for the second Sunday concern Christ's birth in Bethlehem and other prophecies, so the candle may be called the "Bethlehem candle", the "way candle", or the "prophets' candle".
- Third Sunday in Advent: The third Sunday, called Gaudete Sunday after the first word of the introit (Philippians 4:4), is celebrated with rose-coloured vestments similar to Laetare Sunday at the middle point of Lent. The readings relate to John the Baptist, and the rose-coloured candle may be called the "joy candle", "Mary candle", or "shepherds' candle". (Note: In the U.S. Episcopal Church, the collect "Stir up" (the first words of the collect) may be read during the third Sunday in Advent, although before the 1979 revision of the Book of Common Prayer it was sometimes read in the first Sunday in Advent. Even earlier, "stir-up Sunday" was once jocularly associated with the stirring of the Christmas mincemeat, begun before Advent, since the phrase "stir up" occurs at the start of the collect for the last Sunday before Advent in the old 1662 Book of Common Prayer.)
- Fourth Sunday in Advent: The readings for the fourth Sunday relate to the annunciation of Christ's birth, for which the Magnificat or "Song of Mary" may be featured. The candle may be known as the "angel's candle".
- First Sunday after Advent: Where an Advent wreath includes a fifth candle, it is known as the "Christ candle" and is lit during the Christmas Eve service.

=== Other weekly theme variations ===
Other variations of the themes celebrated on each of the four Sundays include:

- The Prophets' Candle, symbolizing hope; the Bethlehem Candle, symbolizing faith; the Shepherds' Candle, symbolizing joy; the Angel's Candle, symbolizing peace
- Hope–Love–Joy–Peace
- Hope–Peace–Joy–Love
- Faithfulness–Hope–Joy–Love
- Prophets–Angels–Shepherds–Magi
- Faith–Prepare–Joy–Love

== See also ==
- Christmas market
- Fasting and abstinence in the Roman Catholic Church
- Great Lent
- Nativity Fast
