= Nativity Fast =

Period of abstinence and penance in Christianity

In Christianity, the Nativity Fast—or Fast of the Prophets in Ethiopian Orthodox Tewahedo Church and Eritrean Orthodox Tewahedo Church—is a period of abstinence and penance practiced by the Eastern Orthodox Church, Oriental Orthodox Church and Catholic Church in preparation for the Nativity of Jesus on December 25. Ethiopian and Eritrean Orthodox Churches commence the season on November 24 and end the season on the day of Ethiopian Christmas, which falls on January 7. The corresponding Western season of preparation for Christmas, which also has been called the Nativity Fast and St. Martin's Lent, has taken the name of Advent. The Eastern fast runs for 40 days instead of four (in the Roman Rite) or six weeks (Ambrosian Rite) and thematically focuses on proclamation and glorification of the Incarnation of God, whereas the Western Advent focuses on three comings (or advents) of Jesus Christ: his birth, reception of his grace by the faithful, and his Second Coming or Parousia.

The Byzantine fast is observed from November 15 to December 24, inclusively. These dates apply to the Eastern Catholic Churches, and Eastern Orthodox churches which use the Revised Julian calendar, which currently matches the Gregorian calendar. For those Eastern Orthodox churches which still follow the Julian calendar—the Greek Orthodox Patriarchate of Jerusalem, the Russian Orthodox Church, the Serbian Orthodox Church, the Georgian Orthodox Church, the Ukrainian Orthodox Church (Moscow Patriarchate), the Macedonian Orthodox Church, Mount Athos, the Portuguese Orthodox Church, and all Old Calendarists, as well as some parishes of the Romanian Orthodox Church, of the Polish Orthodox Church, and of the Orthodox Church of America—the Winter Lent does not begin until November 28 (Gregorian) which coincides with November 15 on the Julian calendar. The Ancient Church of the East fasts dawn til dusk from December 1 until December 25 on the Gregorian calendar.

Sometimes the fast is called Philip's Fast (or the Philippian Fast), as it traditionally begins on the day following the Feast of St. Philip the Apostle (November 14). Some churches, such as the Melkite Greek Catholic Church, have abbreviated the fast to start on December 10, following the Feast of the Conception by Saint Anne of the Most Holy Theotokos.

== Purpose of fasting ==
Through the discipline of fasting, when practiced with prayer, repentance, and almsgiving, it is believed that by controlling bodily desire for food, other passions are controlled as well, and that the soul can orient more away from worldly needs and more towards spiritual needs. Through this practice one is better enabled to draw closer to Christ, and engage in the continuous and synergistic process of becoming more Christ-like. While fasting is practiced with the body, emphasis is on the spiritual facet of the fast rather than mere physical deprivation. Eastern Orthodox theology sees a synthesis between the body and the soul, so what happens to one can be used to have an effect on the other.

== Fasting rules ==
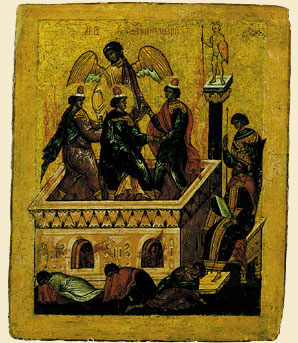
The Three Young Men in the Fiery Furnace, celebrated during the Nativity Fast as a reminder of the grace acquired through fasting (15th century icon of the Novgorod school).

In the Eastern Orthodox Church, the fast traditionally entails fasting from red meat, poultry, meat products, eggs, dairy products, fish, oil, and wine. Fish, wine and oil are allowed on Saturdays and Sundays as well as most Mondays, Tuesdays and Thursdays, and oil and wine are generally allowed on Tuesdays and Thursdays, except in the Ethiopian Orthodox Tewahedo Church.

The fasting rules also permit fish, wine and oil on certain feast days that occur during the course of the fast: Evangelist Matthew (November 16), Apostle Andrew (November 30), Great-martyr Barbara (December 4), St. Nicholas (December 6), St. Spiridon and St. Herman (December 12), St. Ignatius (December 20), etc. The Nativity Fast is not as severe as Great Lent or the Dormition Fast.

As is always the case with Orthodox fasting rules, persons who are ill, the very young or elderly, and nursing mothers are exempt from fasting. Each individual is expected to confer with their confessor regarding any exemptions from the fasting rules, but should never place themselves in physical danger.

There has been some ambiguity about the restriction of fish, whether it means the allowance of invertebrate fish or all fish. Often, even on days when fish is not allowed, shellfish may be consumed. More detailed guidelines vary by jurisdiction, but the rules strictly state that from the December 20 to December 24 (inclusively), no fish may be eaten.

The Eve of Nativity (December 24) is a strict fast day, called Paramony (lit. 'preparation'), on which no solid food should be eaten until Sirius is seen in the evening sky (or at the very least, until after the Vesperal Divine Liturgy that day). If Paramony falls on a Saturday or Sunday, the day is not observed as a strict fast, but a meal with wine and oil is allowed after the Divine Liturgy, which would be celebrated in the morning.

== Liturgical aspects ==
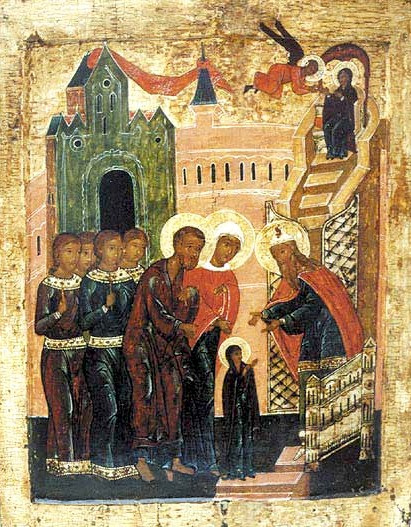
The Entry of the Theotokos into the Temple, the Great Feast which falls during the course of the Nativity Fast (16th-century Russian icon).

In some places, the services on weekdays during the fast are similar to the services during Great Lent (with some variations). Many churches and monasteries in the Russian tradition will perform the Lenten services on at least the first day of the Nativity Fast. Often the hangings in the church will be changed to a somber, Lenten colour.

During the course of the fast, a number of feast days celebrate those Old Testament prophets who prophesied the Incarnation; for instance: Obadiah (November 19), Nahum (December 1), Habbakuk (December 2), Zephaniah (December 3), Haggai (December 16), Daniel and the Three Holy Youths (December 17). These last are significant not only because of their perseverance in fasting, but also because their preservation unharmed in the midst of the fiery furnace is interpreted as being symbolic of the Incarnation—the Virgin Mary conceived God the Word in her womb without being consumed by the fire of the Godhead.

As is true of all of the four Byzantine fasts, a Great Feast falls during the course of the fast; in this case, the Entry of the Theotokos (November 21). After the apodosis (leave-taking) of that feast, hymns of the Nativity are chanted on Sundays and higher-ranking feast days.

=== Forefeast ===
The liturgical Forefeast of the Nativity begins on December 20, and concludes with the Paramony on December 24. During this time hymns of the Nativity are chanted every day. In the Russian usage, the hangings in the church are changed to the festive color (usually white) at the beginning of the Forefeast.

=== Sunday of the Forefathers ===
Two Sundays before Nativity (hence, between 11 and 17 December of each year), the Church calls to remembrance the ancestors of the church, both before the giving of the Law of Moses and after, like Adam, "and on through Seth, Enoch, Noah, Abraham, Isaac, Jacob, King David, and other" biblical righteous. Seth, son of Adam, started the descendants of the Sons of God.

The Menaion contains a full set of hymns for this day which are chanted in conjunction with the regular Sunday hymns from the Octoechos. These hymns commemorate various biblical persons, as well as the prophet Daniel and the Three Young Men. There are also special Epistle (Colossians 3:4–11) and Gospel (Luke 14:16–24) readings appointed for the Divine Liturgy on this day.

=== Sunday of the Holy Fathers ===
The Sunday before Nativity is even broader in its scope of commemoration than the previous Sunday, in that it commemorates all of the righteous men and women who pleased God from the creation of the world up to Saint Joseph. The Menaion provides an even fuller service for this day than the previous Sunday. At the Vespers portion of the All-Night Vigil three Old Testament "parables" (paroemia) are read: Genesis 14:14–20, Deuteronomy 1:8–17 and Deuteronomy 10:14–21. The Epistle which is read at the Divine Liturgy is a selection from Hebrews 11:9–40; the Gospel is the Genealogy of Christ from the Gospel of Matthew (1:1–25)

=== Paramony ===
Christmas Eve is traditionally called Paramony (Greek: παραμονή, Slavonic: navechérie). Paramony is observed as a strict fast day, on which those faithful who are physically able to, refrain from food until the first star is observed in the evening or after the Vesperal Divine Liturgy, when a meal with wine and oil may be taken. On this day the Royal Hours are celebrated in the morning. Some of the hymns are similar to those of Theophany (Epiphany) and Great and Holy Friday, thus tying the symbolism of Christ's Nativity to his death on the Cross. The Royal Hours are followed by the Vesperal Divine Liturgy of St. Basil which combines Vespers with the Divine Liturgy.

During the Vespers, eight Old Testament lections ("parables") which prefigure or prophesy the Incarnation of Christ are read, and special antiphons are chanted. If the Feast of the Nativity falls on a Sunday or Monday, the Royal Hours are chanted on the previous Friday, and on the Paramony the Vesperal Divine Liturgy of St. John Chrysostom is celebrated in the morning, with its readings and antiphons, and the fasting is lessened to some degree—a meal with wine and oil being served after the Liturgy.

The All-Night Vigil on the night of December 24 consists of Great Compline, Matins and the First Hour. One of the highlights of Great Compline is the exultant chanting of "God is with us!" interspersed between selected verses from the prophecy of Isaiah 8:9–18, foretelling the triumph of the Kingdom of God, and 9:2–7, foretelling the birth of the Messiah ("For unto us a child is born...and he shall be called...the Mighty God....").

The Divine Liturgy for the Nativity of Christ is celebrated on Christmas morning. However, in those monasteries which continue to celebrate the All-Night Vigil in its long form—where it literally lasts throughout the night—the conclusion of the Vigil at dawn on Christmas morning will often lead directly into the celebration of the Divine Liturgy. When the Vigil is separate from the Divine Liturgy, the Lenten fast continues even after the Vigil, until the end of the Liturgy the next morning.

=== Fasting during the afterfeast ===
On December 25, the Afterfeast of the Nativity of Christ begins. From that day to January 4 (the day before Theophany Eve) is a fast-free period. The Eve of the Theophany (January 5) is another strict fast day (paramony).

== Coptic fast ==
In the Coptic Orthodox Church, an additional fast is observed on the three days before the beginning of the Nativity Fast, to commemorate the miraculous moving of the mountain of Mukattam (which lies within a suburb of Cairo) at the hands of Saint Simon the Tanner in the year 975, during the rule of the Muslim Fatimid Caliph Al-Muizz Li-Deenillah.

== Armenian fast ==
Uniquely, the Armenian Apostolic Church celebrates Nativity on January 6. Their Fast of Advent begins after seventh Sunday before Christmas. They then observe a Fast of the Nativity for one week prior to the Feast of the Nativity on January 6 (see Armenian Calendar of Saints).

== Eastern Rite Catholics ==
The fasting discipline varies somewhat amongst the various sui iuris Eastern Churches in communion with the Holy See, though in general their rules are now less strict than those observed by the Eastern and Oriental Orthodox. In modern times within the Byzantine Rite Catholic Church, the fast is largely kept on a voluntary basis with the faithful allowed to determine on their own the degree to which they wish to adhere to the traditional rules. However, abstinence from meat remains obligatory on most Fridays during the year. Within the Ukrainian Greek Catholic Church "...the Church has moderated the strict fasting rules of the past, leaving the specific practice to the discretion of the faithful. However, this does not remove the call to the spirit of sacrifice, repentance, and fasting." Currently the only obligatory discipline is abstinence from meat on Wednesdays and Fridays with all other foods being permitted.

== See also ==
- Christmastide
- Great Lent
- Apostles' Fast
- Dormition Fast
