= Gaudete Sunday =

Among the Western Christian Churches, the third Sunday of Advent

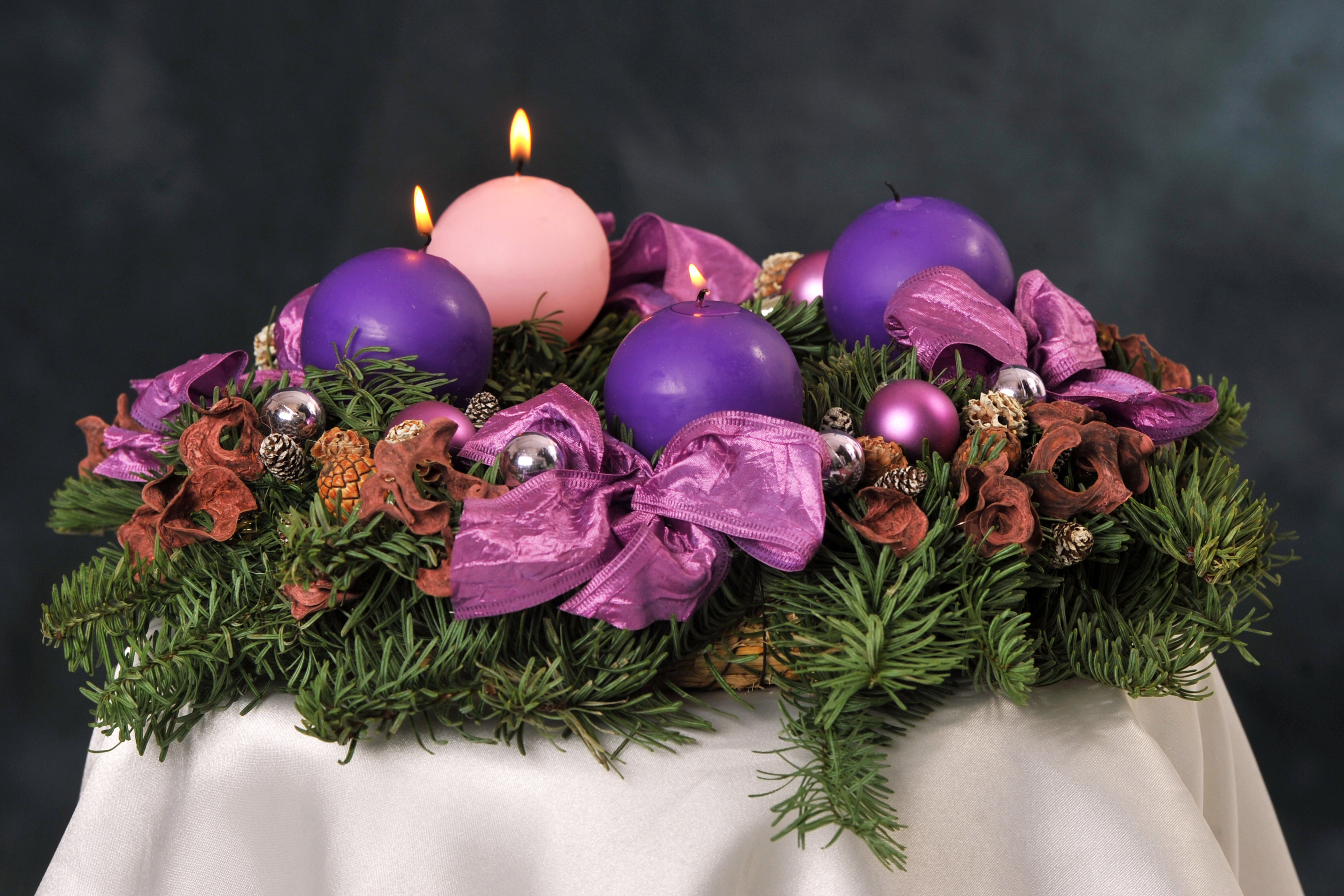
- One of the candles surrounding the Christ Candle in the Advent wreath is rose coloured for Gaudete Sunday, the beginning of the third week in Advent.
- Observed by: Occident
- Liturgical color: Rose
- Type: Christian
- Observances: Church services; candles; Advent hymns
- Date: Second-final Sunday before Christmas Day
- 2025 date: 14 December
- 2026 date: 13 December
- 2027 date: 12 December
- 2028 date: 17 December

Gaudete Sunday (/ɡaʊˈdɛtɛ/ gow-DET-eh) is the third Sunday of Advent in the liturgical calendar of Western Christianity, including the Roman Catholic Church, the Anglican Communion, Lutheran churches, and other mainline Protestant churches. It can fall on any date from 11 December to 17 December.

== Gaudete ==
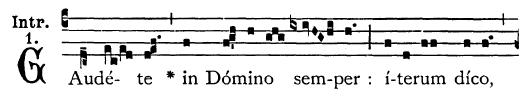
The incipit for the Gregorian chant introit from which Gaudete Sunday gets its name

The day takes its common name from the Latin word Gaudete ("Rejoice"), the first word of the introit of this day's Mass:

Gaudete in Domino semper: iterum dico, gaudete. Modestia vestra nota sit omnibus hominibus: Dominus enim prope est. Nihil solliciti sitis: sed in omni oratione et obsecratione cum gratiarum actione petitiones vestræ innotescant apud Deum. Benedixisti Domine terram tuam: avertisti captivitatem Jacob.

Rejoice in the Lord always; again I will say, Rejoice. Let your gentleness be known to everyone. The Lord is near. Do not be anxious about anything, but in everything by prayer and supplication with thanksgiving let your requests be made known to God.

LORD, you were favorable to your land; you restored the fortunes of Jacob.

— Philippians 4:4–6; Psalm 85 (84):1

== Background ==
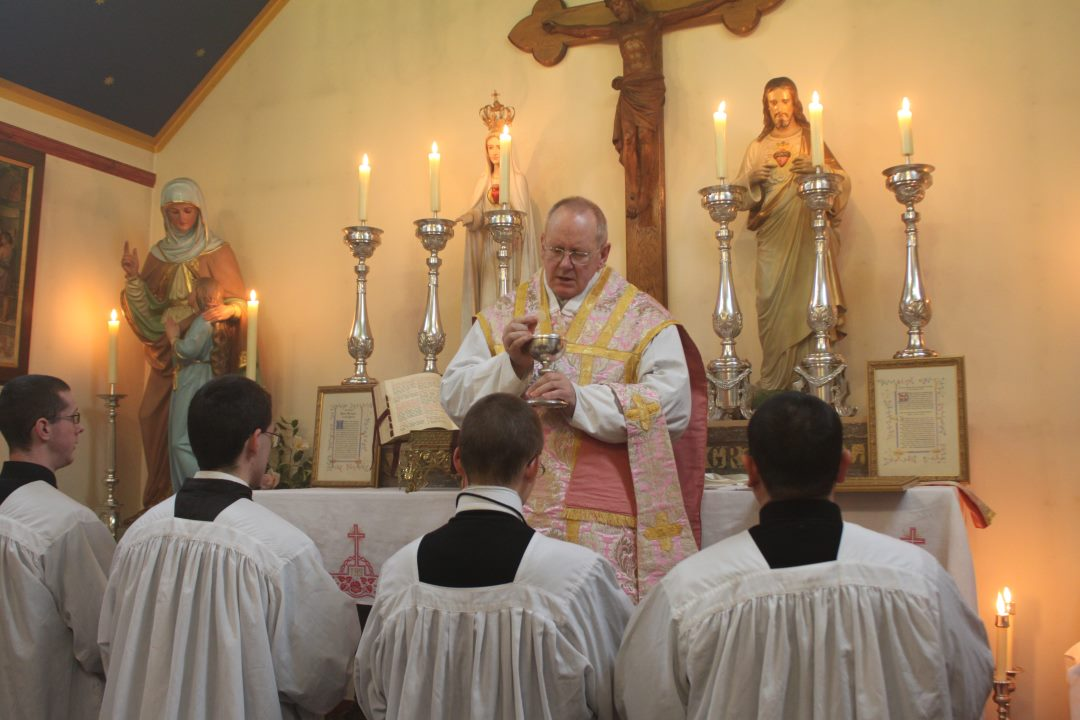
Roman Catholic Gaudete Sunday Mass in which the priest is wearing the customary rose vestments

The season of Advent originated as a fast of 40 days in preparation for Christmas, commencing on the day after the feast of Saint Martin (11 November), whence it was often called Saint Martin's Lent, a name by which it was known as early as the fifth century. In the ninth century, the duration of Advent was reduced to four weeks (a period starting four Sundays before Christmas), and Advent preserved most of the characteristics of a penitential season, which made it a kind of counterpart to Lent. Gaudete Sunday is a counterpart to Laetare Sunday, and provides a similar break about midway through a season which is otherwise of a penitential character, and signifies the nearness of the Lord's coming.

The spirit of the liturgy throughout Advent is one of expectation and preparation for the feast of Christmas as well as for the second coming of Christ, and the penitential exercises suitable to that spirit are thus on Gaudete Sunday suspended, as it were, for a while, in order to symbolize that joy and gladness in the promised Redemption.

== Theme ==
While the theme of Advent is a focus on the coming of Jesus in three ways: his first, his present, and his final Advent, the readings for Gaudete Sunday deal with rejoicing in the Lord – Christian joy – as well as the mission of John the Baptist and his connection with Advent. The theologian Thomas Aquinas described the difference between joy and happiness. Happiness is the final end of man, eternal contemplation of God, which is an act of the intellect. Joy, however, is itself not a virtue, but is an effect of the virtue of charity ("love"), which is full if its object is eternal and the greatest, i.e. God. Joy admits no sorrow for it is not an act of the sensitive faculties, e.g. enjoying food is a natural joy for Thomas, but supernatural joy which is spoken of on Gaudete Sunday and in the Gospels is an act of the intellectual appetite known as the will.

In his 2014 Gaudete Sunday homily, Pope Francis said that Gaudete Sunday is known as the "Sunday of joy", and that instead of fretting about "all they still haven't" done to prepare for Christmas, people should "think of all the good things life has given you."

== Liturgical colour ==
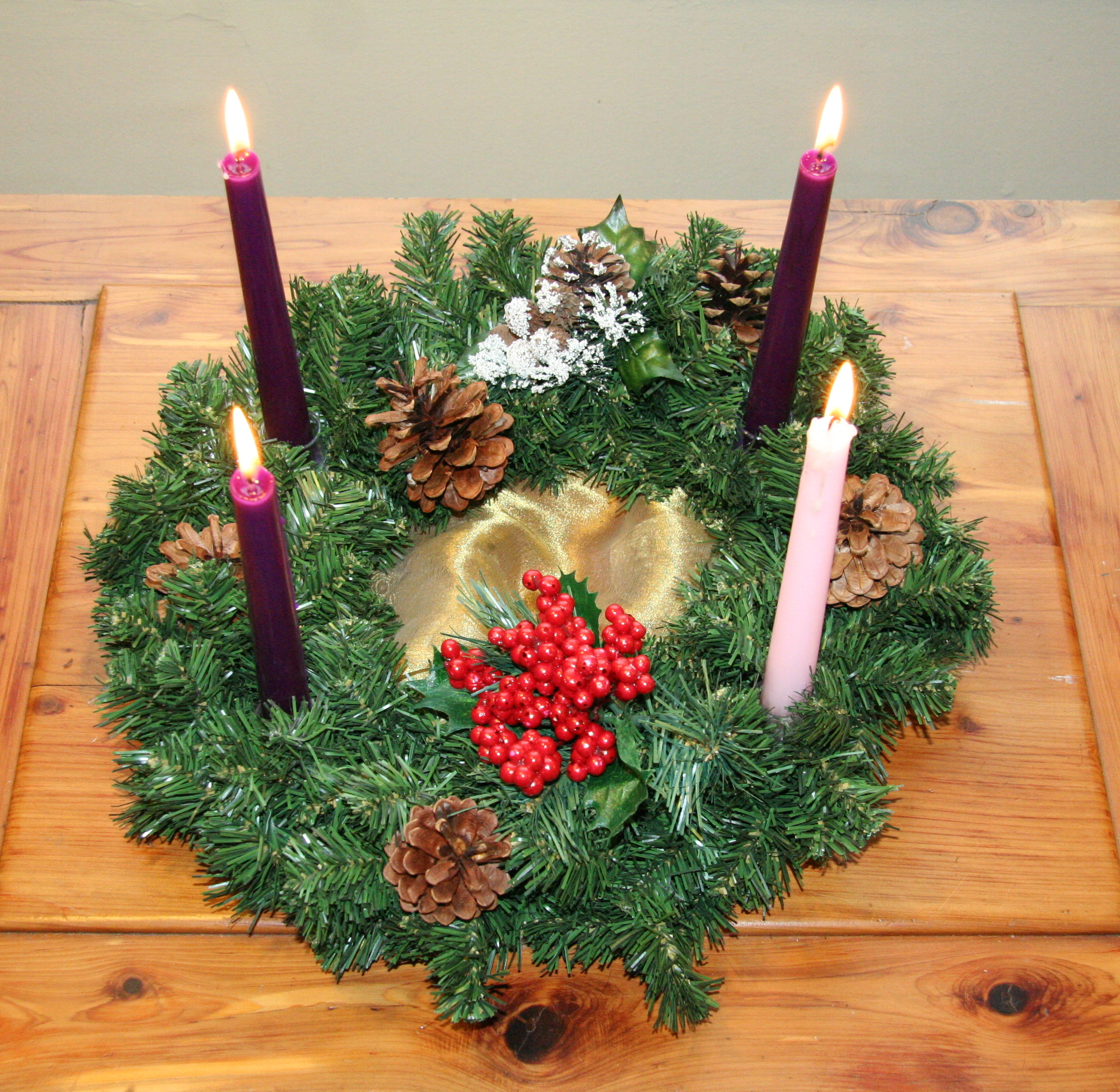
An Advent wreath with the customary single rose-coloured candle for Gaudete Sunday

On Gaudete Sunday rose-coloured vestments may be worn instead of violet (or instead of deep blue, in some Anglican and Lutheran traditions), which is otherwise prescribed for every day in the season of Advent. Gaudete Sunday was also known as "Rose Sunday".

In churches that have an Advent wreath, the rose-coloured candle is lit in addition to two of the violet- or blue-coloured candles, which represent the first two Sundays of Advent. Despite the otherwise somber readings of the season of Advent, which has as a secondary theme the need for penitence, the readings on the third Sunday emphasize the joyous anticipation of the Lord's coming.

In Anglicanism, the use of rose-pink, previously informally observed, was formally noted as an option in the Church of England in the Common Worship liturgical renewal.

== See also ==
- Advent Sunday
- Gaudete, a Christmas carol
- Laetare Sunday
