= Chrismon tree =

Liturgical Christmas decoration

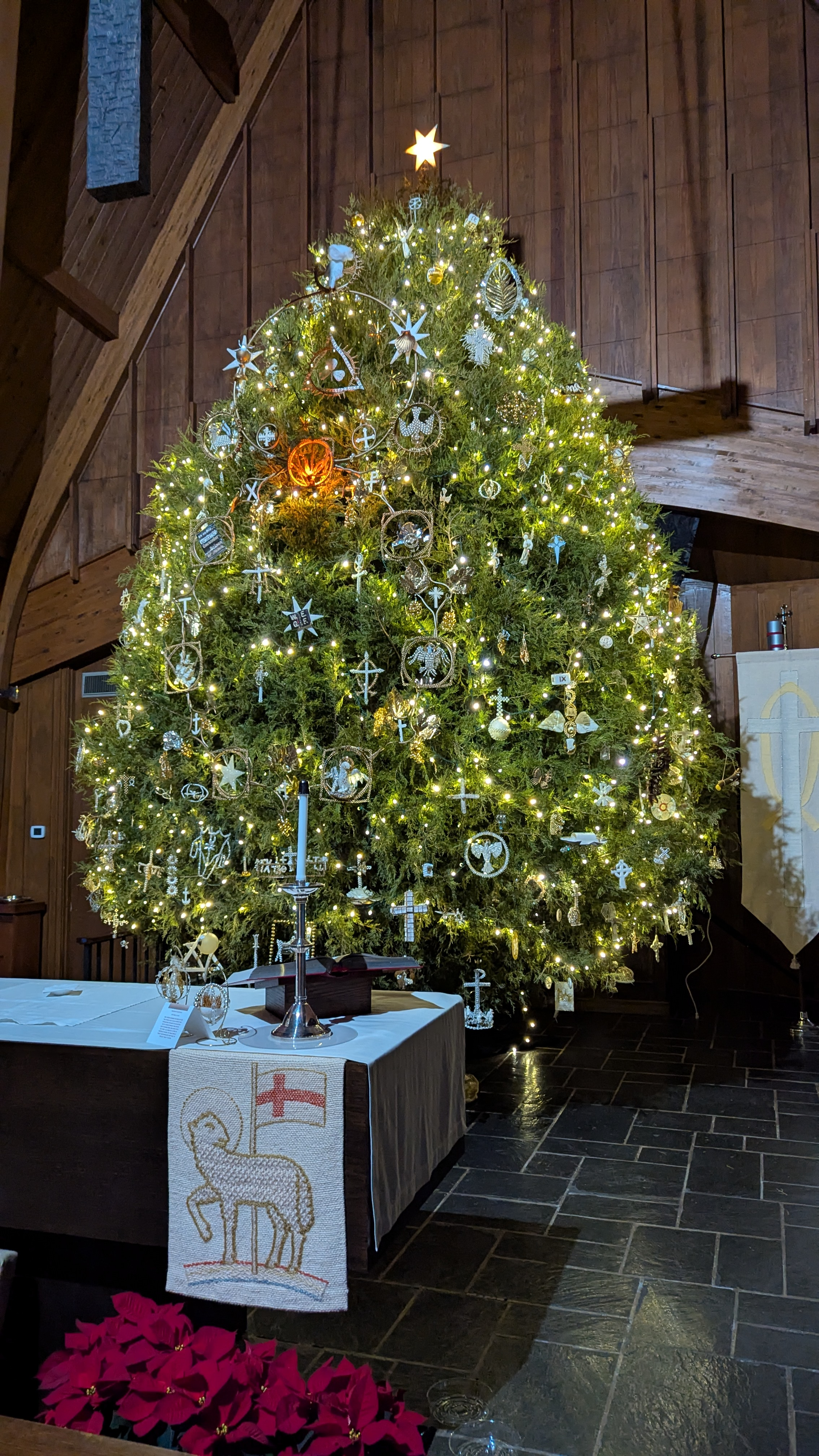
Chrismon Tree on Christmas Eve at Ascension Lutheran Church in Danville, Virginia.

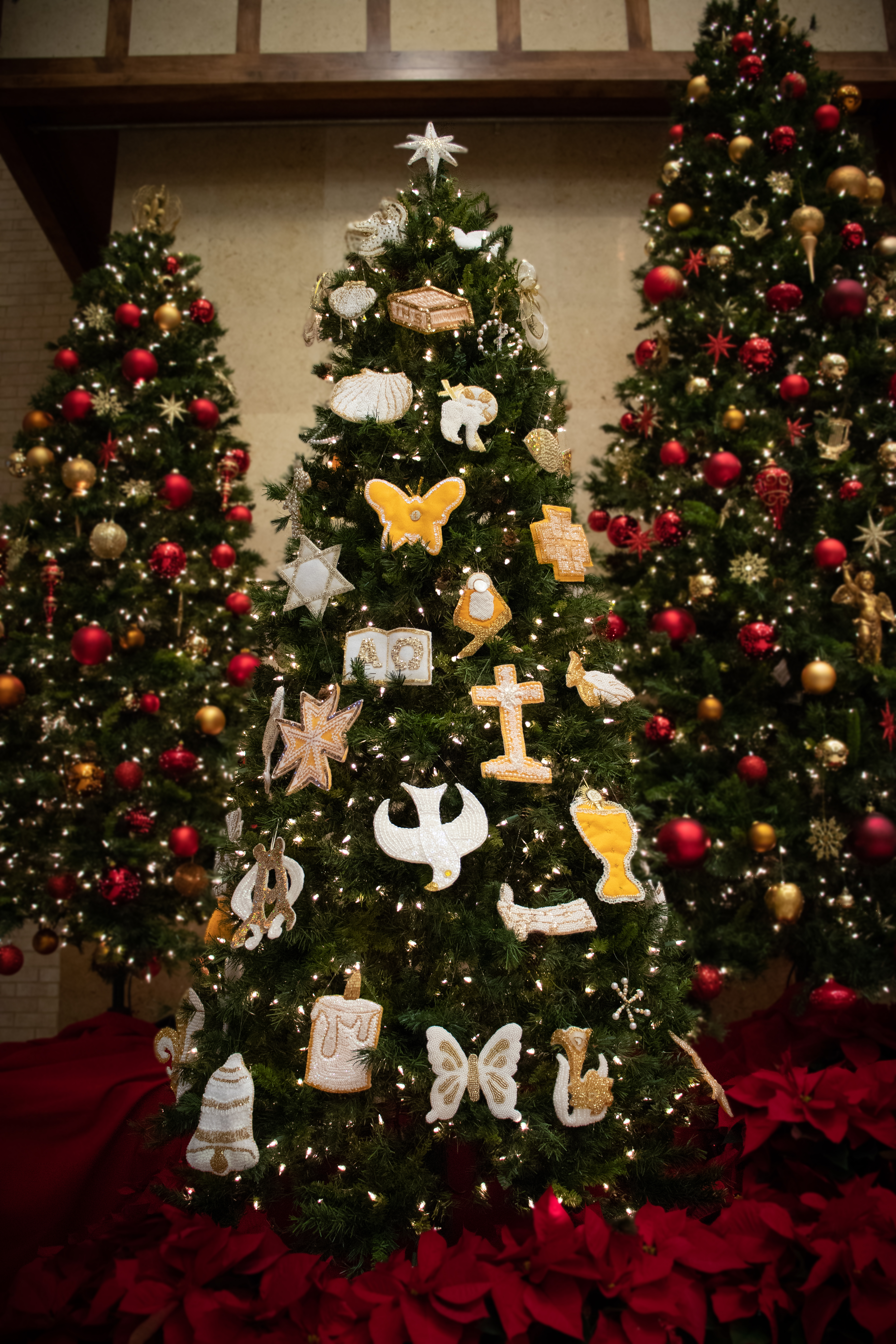
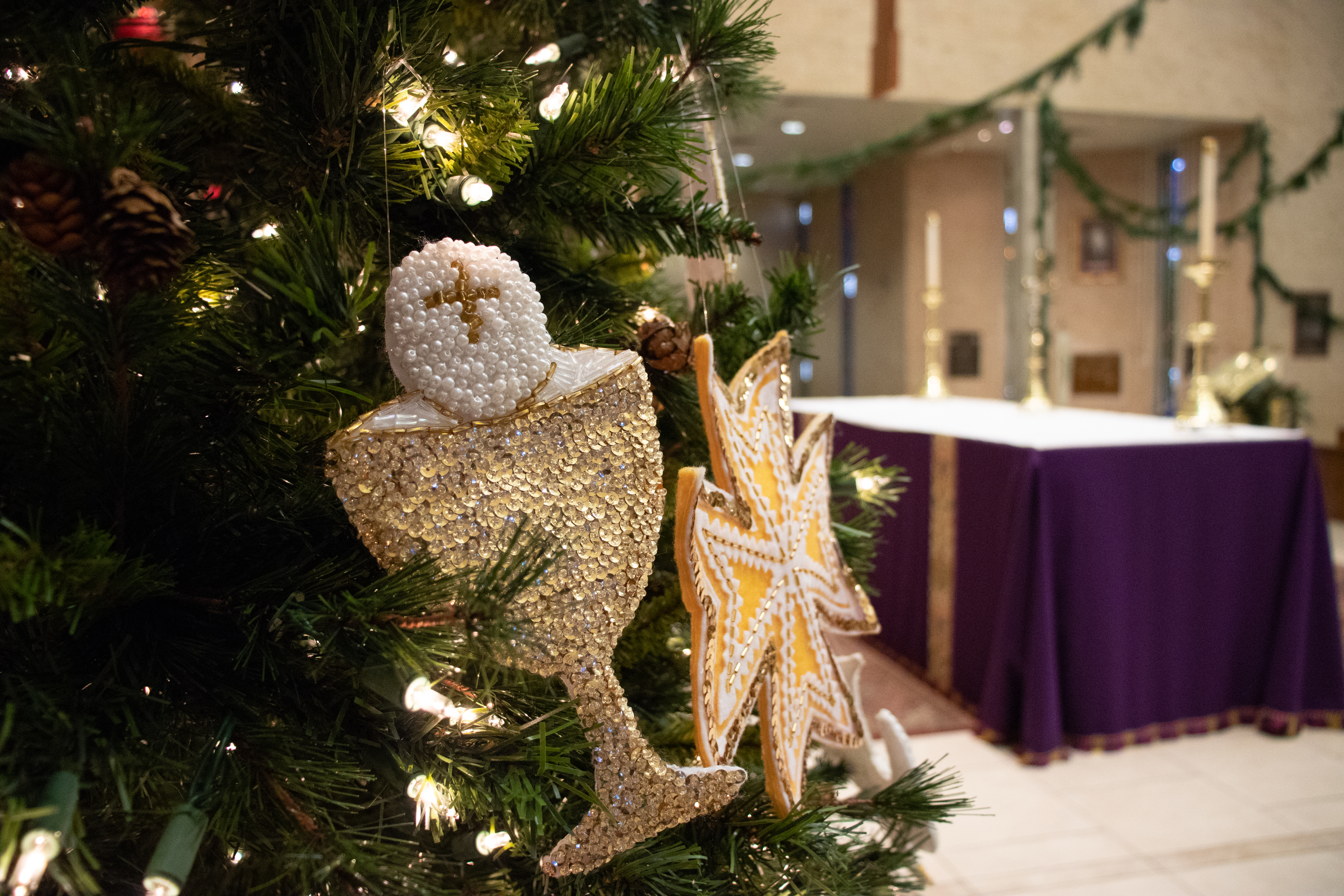
A Chrismon tree in the chancel of St. Louis King of France Catholic Church in Austin.

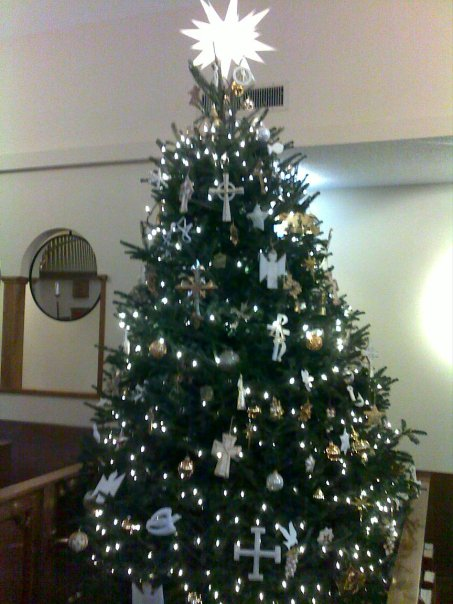
A Chrismon tree in the nave of St Alban's Anglican Cathedral in Oviedo

A Chrismon tree is a type of Christmas tree decorated with Christian symbols and intended to invoke the Christmas story. A Chrismon tree consists of an evergreen tree decorated with hanging ornaments with symbols invoking the Christmas story, called monograms, and is often placed in the chancel or nave of a church during Advent and Christmastide. The Chrismon tree was first used by North American Lutherans in 1957, although the practice has spread to other Christian denominations, including Anglicans, Catholics, Methodists, and the Reformed.

== History ==
The Chrismon tree tradition originated at Ascension Lutheran Church in Danville, Virginia, in 1957, when Mrs. Frances Kipps Spencer volunteered to decorate that year's church Christmas Tree. She designed "numerous ornament from the symbols or 'Monograms' used by early Christians to identify themselves with Christ ... Mrs. Spencer said the tree was not finished until someone came to see it and had the story of Christ explained to them through the Chrismons." Today, Chrismon trees represent an interdenominational "heritage of all Christians." As with the ordinary Christmas trees, the evergreen tree itself, for Christians, "symbolizes the eternal life Jesus Christ provides". However, the Chrismon tree differs from the traditional Christmas tree in that it "is decorated only with clear lights and Chrismons made from white and gold material", the latter two being the liturgical colours of the Christmas season.

== Christian symbolism ==
The Chrismon tree is adorned with Chrismons, "ancient symbols for Christ or some part of Christ's ministry: the dove descending down, fish, Celtic cross, Jerusalem cross, shepherd's crook, chalice, shell, and others." Laurence Hull Stookey writes that "because many symbols of the Chrismon tree direct our attention to the nature and ultimate work of Christ, they can be helpful in calling attention to Advent themes."

The purpose of a Chrismon tree is to tell a story. The symbols and Monograms tell the story of Christ, his teachings, life, death, and resurrection, as described in Christian scripture. Chrismons also tell stories of tradition, creativity, faith, and ultimately, the love and grace of God, realized through the gift of Christ incarnate.

== Gallery ==
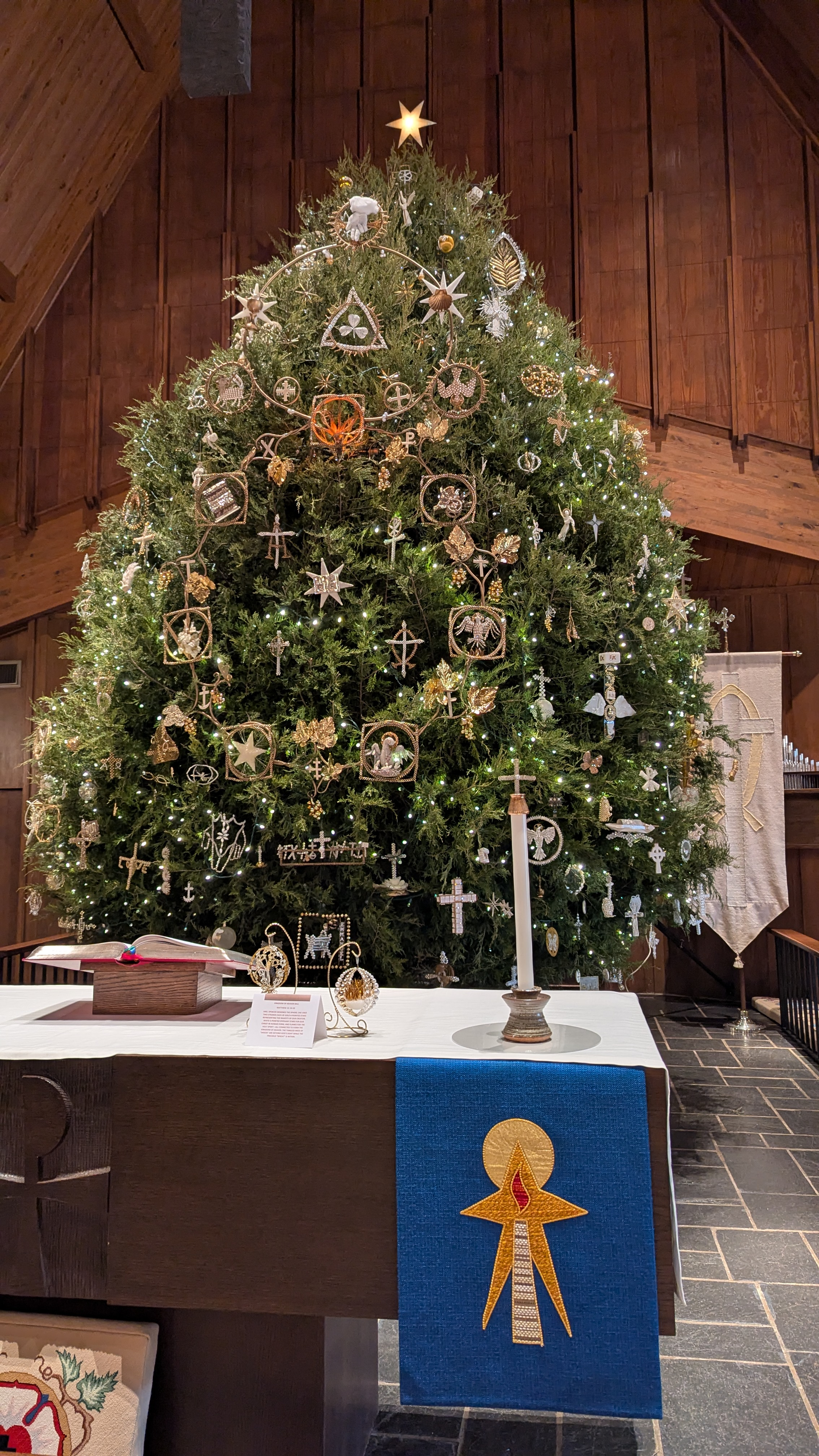
The 68th Annual Chrismon Tree at Ascension Lutheran Church in Danville, Virginia. In the center of the tree sits a 9-foot-tall Chrismon, titled "The Christian Year Series". It depicts the Holy Trinity and the Church's liturgical calendar. Blue paraments on the altar signify the season of Advent.

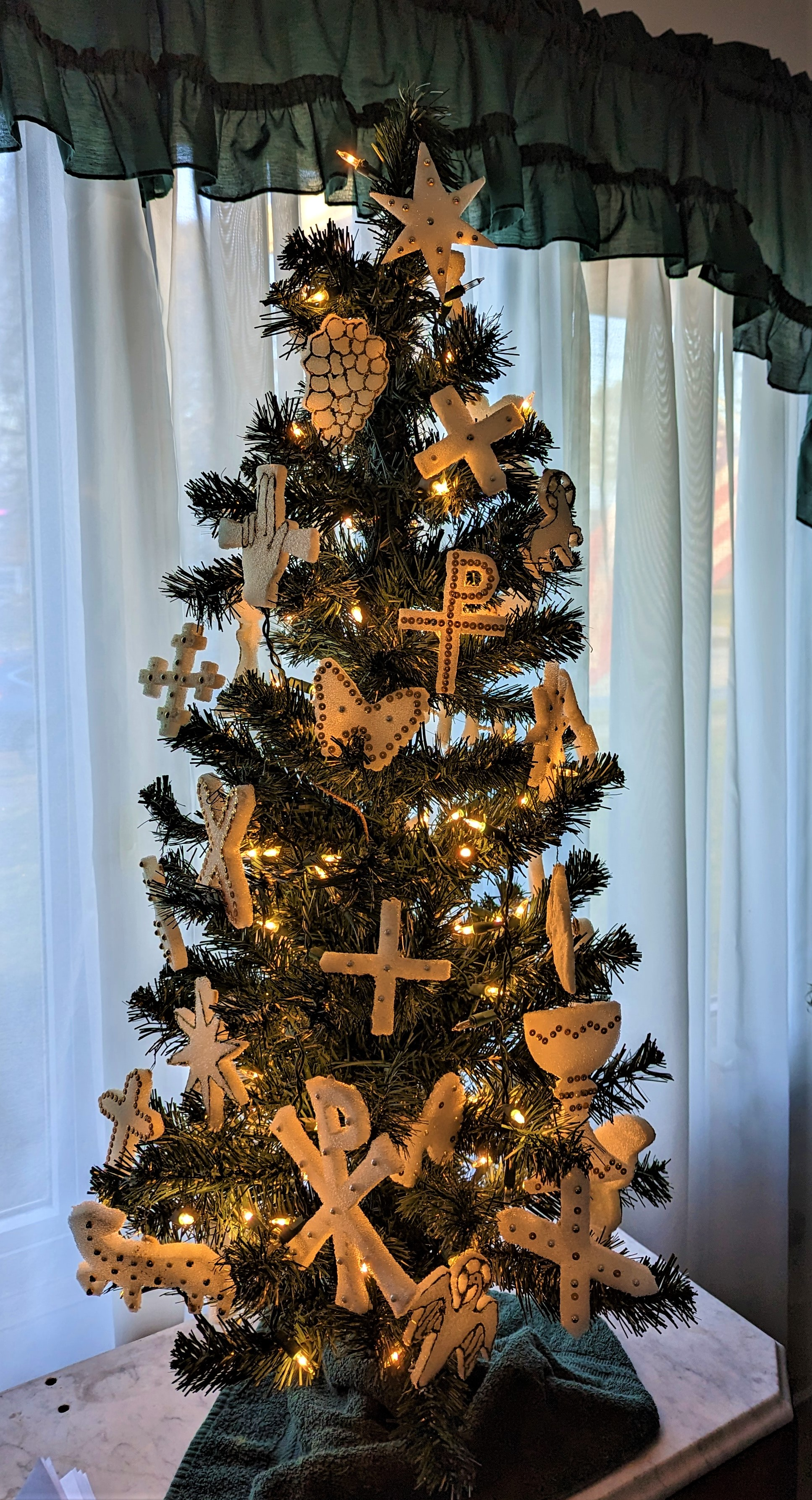
Chrismon tree in a private home in Pennsylvania

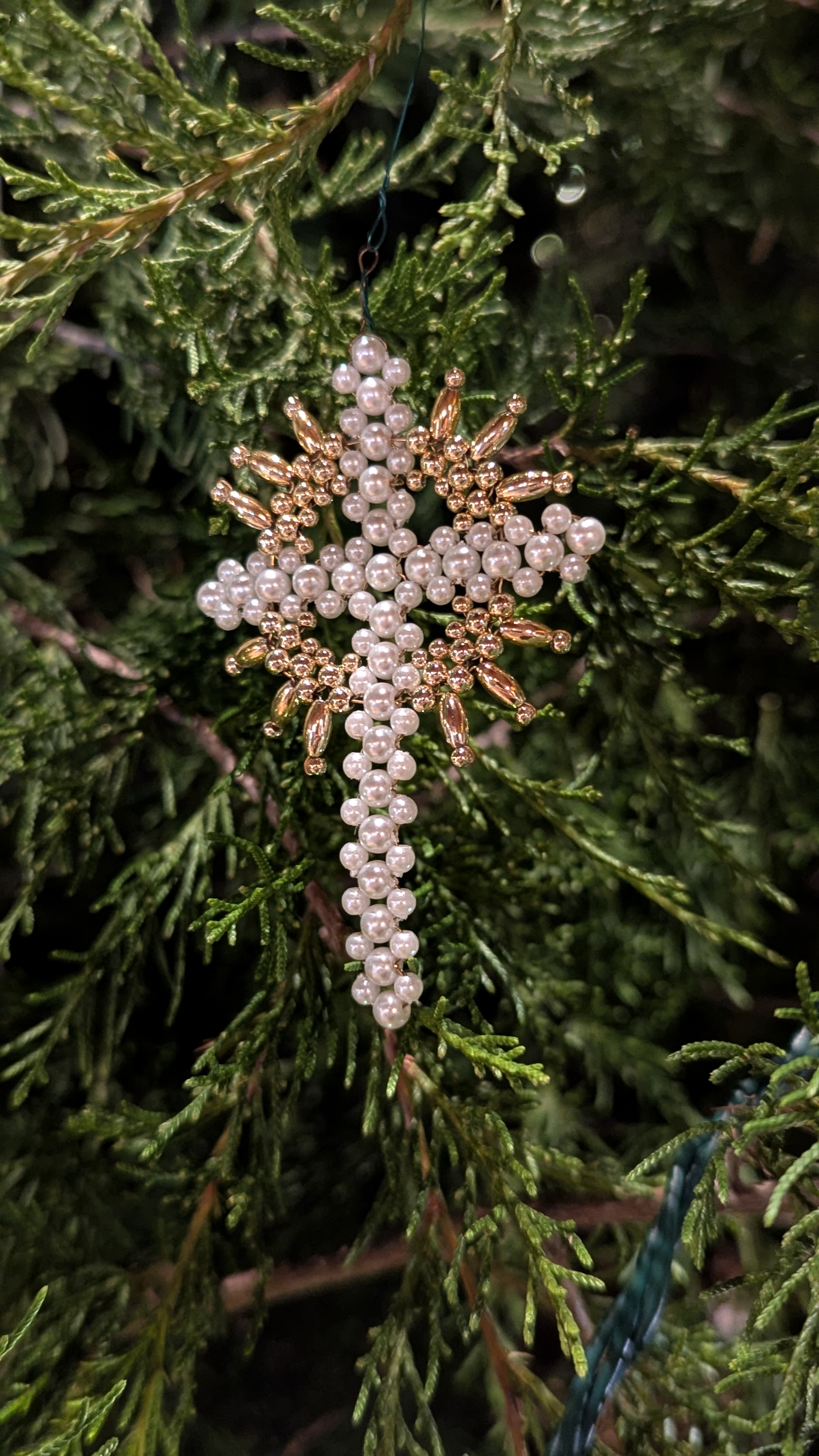
A Latin cross chrismon hanging on a Chrismon tree

== See also ==
- Hanging of the greens
- Hanukkah bush
