= Christa Ludwig (writer) =

German writer

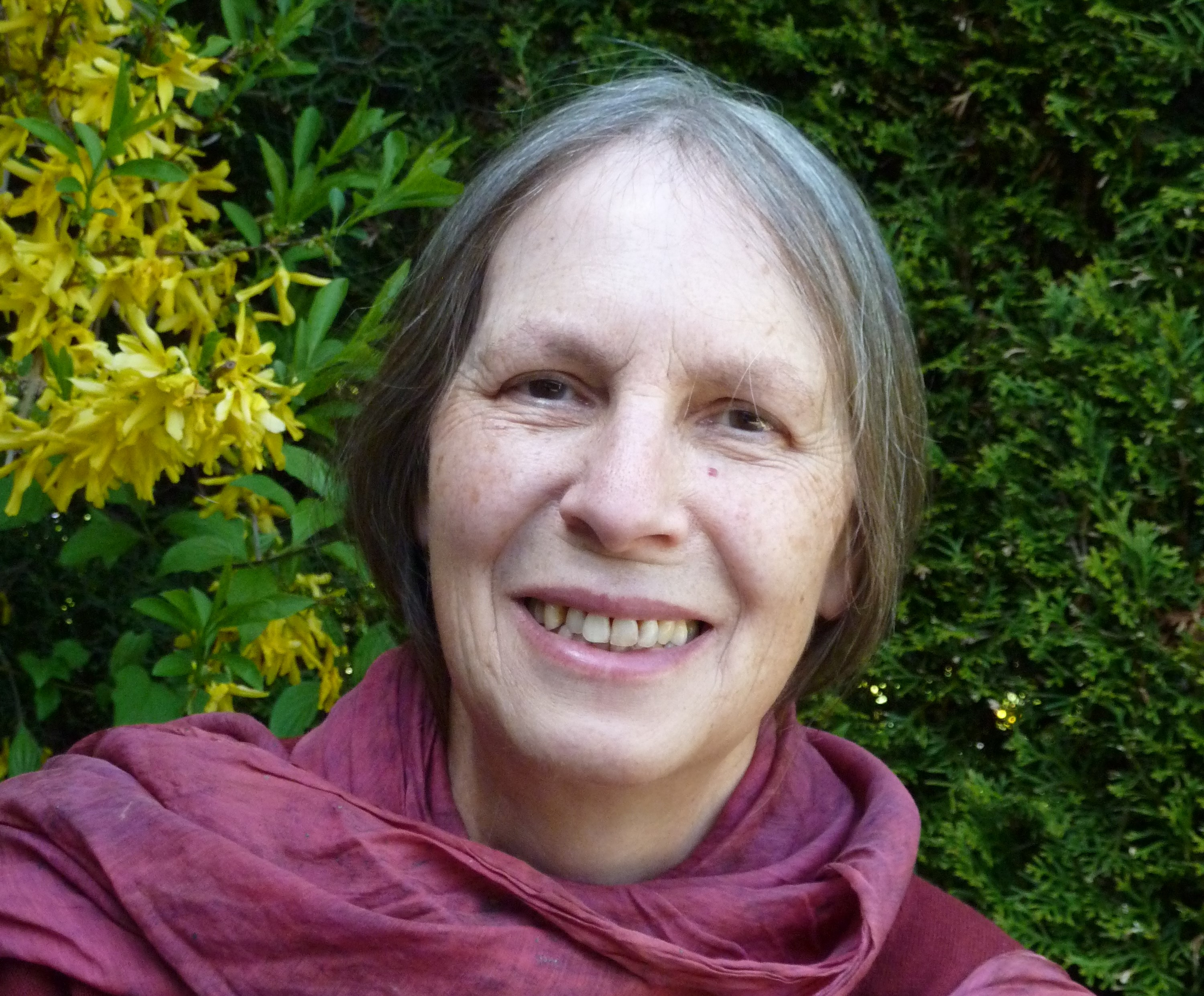
- Christa Ludwig in 2018
- Born: Christa Schnorrenberg; 1 November 1949 (age 76); Wolfhagen, Hesse, Germany
- Education: Goethe-Gymnasium; University of Münster
- Occupations: Teacher; Writer; Editor
- Organizations: Schule Schloss Salem
- Awards: Eichendorff-Literaturpreis

Christa Ludwig (née Schnorrenberg; born 1 November 1949) is a German teacher, writer and editor, specializing in books for young people. She taught at Schule Schloss Salem before turning to freelance writing. After books and series related to horses, a novel about the Jerusalem years of Else Lasker-Schüler was published in 2018. She received the Eichendorff-Literaturpreis.

== Life and work ==
Born in Wolfhagen, Ludwig attended the Goethe-Gymnasium in Dortmund and majored in German studies and English at the University of Münster from 1968, then in Berlin to 1974, where she subsequently worked as a teacher. Later she moved to work at the boarding school Schule Schloss Salem, in the department housed at Hohenfels Castle in Hohenfels, Konstanz.

Ludwig's first published work, a fable play entitled Die Kinder und die Tiere im Weltenreich Volumien, was originally written for her pupils; it was published in 1983 as a one-off special edition in a small number of copies. From 1989 onwards, she has worked as a freelance writer. She is known for books for young people and young adults. Her many years of experience with horses resulted in the six-volume series Hufspuren (Hoof prints), which was read especially by young horse lovers. This was followed by the volumes Himmelshuf (Heaven's hoof) and Mähnenmeer (Sea of manes) as well as other books on the subject of horses, but also individual works for adult readers.

Ludwig received a scholarship from the "Förderkreis deutscher Schriftsteller" in 1998. In August 2001, an audio play after her story "Pendelblut" (Pendulum blood), produced and broadcast by NDR, was chosen as the Hörspiel des Monats (audio play of the month). In 2005, her novel Carlos in der Nacht (Carlos in the night) was shortlisted for the Goldene Leslie for the best German-language book for young people of the year. She wrote a novel about the late years of the lyricist Else Lasker-Schüler in Jerusalem, Ein Bündel Wegerich (A Sheaf of Plantain). The book was developed over 20 years, supported by a travel grant for research in Jerusalem. It was published in 2018, ready for the poet's 150th anniversary of birth in 2019. She was awarded the Eichendorff-Literaturpreis then, with the jury saying "Her publications are sensitive and insistent, they are educating and full of inner sympathies for human and nature."

Ludwig is a member of the Verband deutscher Schriftstellerinnen und Schriftsteller and of the Autorenkreis Historischer Roman Quo Vadis, an association of authors of historical novels. Since 2014, she has been editor and co-editor of the annual literary and cultural magazine Mauerläufer. She performs readings from her books in Germany.

Ludwig is married and lives in Hohenfels; the couple has three adult sons.

== Honours ==
- 1998 Scholarship of the Förderkreis deutscher Schriftsteller
- 1999 Third prize of the Ellwanger Jugendliteraturpreis
- 2001 Hörspiel des Jahres ("Pendelblut") of the Deutsche Akademie der Darstellenden Künste
- 2019 Eichendorff-Literaturpreis

== Publications ==
- Der eiserne Heinrich. Ravensburger 1989
- Die Kastanienallee oder Das Loch in der Sackgasse (children's book). anrich 1990
- Ein Lied für Daphnes Fohlen. Anrich, Kevelaer 1994, ISBN 3-89106-184-6
- Kaiser, König, Bettelkind, picture book, Esslinger 1996
- Links neben Cori, children's book, anrich 1995
- Die Federtoten. anrich 1997
- Blitz ohne Donner. Verlag Freies Geistesleben, Stuttgart 2003, ISBN 3-7725-2245-9
- Carlos in der Nacht. Verlag Freies Geistesleben, Stuttgart 2005, ISBN 3-7725-1545-2
- Die Siebte Sage. Verlag Freies Geistesleben, Stuttgart 2007, ISBN 978-3-7725-2177-5
- Hufspuren (series). Verlag Freies Geistesleben, Stuttgart 2008–2010
- Himmelshuf und Mähnenmeer. Verlag Freies Geistesleben, Stuttgart 2011, ISBN 978-3-7725-2367-0
- Puzzle-Ponys. Verlag Freies Geistesleben, Stuttgart 2012, ISBN 978-3-7725-2478-3
- Bellcanto. Verlag Freies Geistesleben, Stuttgart 2016, ISBN 978-3-7725-2797-5
- Christa Ludwig: Persönlich. Verlag Freies Geistesleben, Stuttgart 2017, ISBN 978-3-7725-2267-3
- Ein Bündel Wegerich, novel about the Jerusalem years of Else Lasker-Schüler. Verlag Oktaven, Stuttgart 2018, ISBN 978-3-7725-3008-1
