= ArsEdition =

German publishing company

- Parent company: Bonnier
- Founded: 1896
- Founder: Josef Müller
- Country of origin: Germany
- Publication types: Books
- Official website: www.arsedition.de

arsEdition is a German publishing company, founded in 1896 by Austrian Josef Müller. Since 2000 it is part of the Bonnier group.

== History ==
The company was founded in 1896 in Munich by the Austrian Josef Müller, as ars sacra Josef Müller Kunstanstalten. It began by publishing religious prints and prayer books, as well as devotional articles such as holy cards, which it printed as Ars Sacra Verlag. After 1912, the company also published books on theology. At the end of the 1920s, helped by the publisher's connections to notable and promising authors such as Ida Bohatta und Maria Innocentia Hummel, the company expanded into children's books as well.

When Marcel Nauer took over management in 1979, a radical reorganization followed, and the company was divided into three core activities: children's books, gift books, and non-book articles.

In 2004, Expedition in die geheime Welt der Drachen was the first title of the new series "Geheime Welten," or "secret worlds," a series of children's books featuring dragons, magic, pirates, and such themes done in pop-up books.

== Notable authors and illustrators ==
- Isabel Abedi
- Marliese Arold
- Ida Bohatta
- Erhard Dietl
- Franziska Gehm
- Maria Innocentia Hummel
- Hans Kruppa
- Fabian Lenk
- Andreas Untersberger
- Klaus-Peter Wolf
