= Hohenfels =

Hohenfels may refer to:

Place names

- Hohenfels, Konstanz municipality in Landkreis Konstanz in Baden-Württemberg, near Stockach
- Hohenfels, Bavaria municipality in Landkreis Neumarkt in Oberpfalz in Bavaria.
- suburb of Albbruck in Landkreis Waldshut in Baden-Württemberg
- suburb of Hohenfels-Essingen in Landkreis Vulkaneifel in Rheinland-Pfalz

Castles

- Château de Hohenfels in the municipality of Dambach in the Alsace, France
- Hohenfels Castle (Allendorf) in the municipality of Dautphetal in Hesse, Germany
- Hohenfels Castle (Upper Palatinate) in the municipality of Hohenfels, Bavaria, Germany
- Hohenfels Castle (Hohenfels) in the municipality of Hohenfels, Konstanz, Baden-Württemberg, Germany
- Hohenfels Castle (Palatinate) in the municipality of Imsbach, Rhineland-Palatinate, Germany
- Hohenfels Castle (Sipplingen) in the municipality of Sipplingen, Baden-Württemberg, Germany

Villa

- Villa Hohenfels in Vienna

Families

- Burkart von Hohenfels
- Stella Freifrau von Hohenfels-Berger (1857−1920)
- House of Hohenfels (Hesse), a Hessian noble family
