= Advent calendar =

Special calendar used to count the days of Advent in anticipation of Christmas

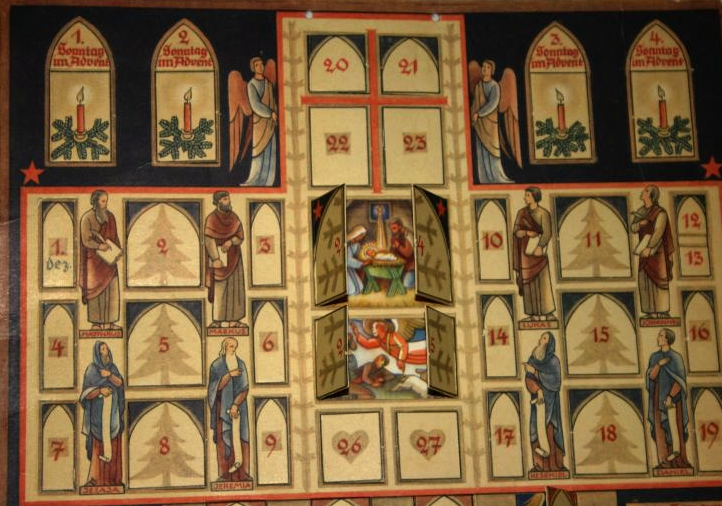
An Advent calendar with the nativity scene behind the 24th door and the adoration of the shepherds behind the 25th. Each of the four Sundays in Advent has an additional door.

An Advent calendar, from the German word Adventskalender, is used to count the days of Advent in anticipation of Christmas. Since the date of the First Sunday of Advent varies, falling between November 27 and December 3 inclusive, many reusable Advent calendars made of paper or wood begin on December 1. Others start from the First Sunday of Advent.

The Advent calendar was first used by German Lutherans in the 19th and 20th centuries, and has since then spread to other denominations.

== Design and use ==
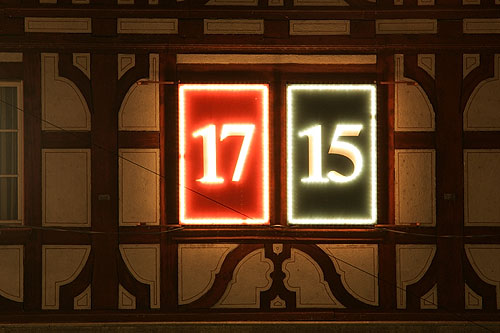
Doors for 15 and 17 December of an Advent calendar at a building in Lucerne, Switzerland

Traditional Advent calendars feature the manger scene, Saint Nicholas and winter weather, while others range in theme, from sports to technology. They come in a multitude of forms, from a simple paper calendar with flaps covering each of the days to fabric pockets on a background scene to painted wooden boxes with cubby holes for small items.

Many Advent calendars take the form of a large rectangular card with flaps (variously referred to as doors or windows), one for each day of December leading up to and including Christmas Eve (December 24) or Christmas Day (December 25). Consecutive doors are opened every day leading up to Christmas, beginning on the start of the Advent season for that year, or simply on December 1, as is the case of reusable Advent calendars.

Often the doors are distributed across the calendar in no particular order. The calendar doors open to reveal an image, a poem, a portion of a story (such as the story of the Nativity of Jesus), or a small gift, such as a toy or a chocolate. Often, each door has a Bible verse and Christian prayer printed on it, which Christians incorporate as part of their daily Advent devotions.

There are many variations of Advent calendars; some European villages create Advent calendars on buildings or even so-called "living" Advent calendars, where different windows are decorated for each day of Advent.

== History ==
=== Post-war ===
Soon after World War II, the longing for an "ideal world" set in, including the Christmas season. By 1945, Advent calendars were once again being produced in all occupation zones. These calendars were primarily based on sweet designs from around 1930. Some publishers, like Erika in Heidenau, reprinted their older works. Today, these calendars can often only be distinguished from the older copies by the poorer quality of the paper and printing after the war. Returning to old originals was ultimately a matter of costs. In addition, some of the designers who had been active before the war continued to work in this field afterwards. Initially, especially tear-off calendars were popular.

=== Sellmer ===
The Richard Sellmer publishing house received the license to print advent calendars in December 1945 in Stuttgart, from the American occupation authorities. The permission to print 50,000 calendars was covered via paper from the French occupation zone. Richard Sellmer manufactured the stand-up calendar Die kleine Stadt ("The Little Town"), designed by Elisabeth Lörcher. He presented it at the Messe Frankfurt and was looking for US-customers. Even the first calendar was already designed in English and Swedish. The marketing focus on international sales was obvious from the start. Manuals in English and French were already added to the calendars "Alt-Stuttgart" since 1948. US soldiers coming home helped in spreading the calendars which led to Sellmer getting a major order of 50,000 calendars by an aid organisation for epileptics. After the magazine Newsweek showed a picture of Eisenhower's grandson on an Advent calendar in December 1953, demand rose massively.

For 1954 a calendar was produced, showing the White House as the central design, surrounded by cowboys, prairie schooners and land yachts. This calendar was also specifically commissioned for the US market, just like the "Fairy Tales" calendar from the same year. Other producers started following the successful trend as well, and so the calendar Bastelhaus or Children's Workshop, of Ulla Wittkuhn started showing two different designs for the 24th of December: a Christmas tree and Mary with child for the German children, a burning fireplace for the children of the US.

Between 1946 and 1998 more than 230 various Advent calendars were produced by the Sellmer publishing company. Around 2010, it offered approximately 100 different motifs each year. Many of the calendars reflect the varying traditions of the countries for which they are produced. For instance, calendars for Switzerland leave out Saint Nicholas; angels in the US have no wings and religious themes are preferred in the United Kingdom.

=== Other publishers ===
Other publishers also resumed production in 1946. For a few years, tear-off calendars were widespread, but by around 1950, they had largely been replaced by calendars with fold-out doors. The Ars Sacra publishing house in Munich produced carefully designed calendars full of small details, naturally focusing on religious themes. Between 1954 and 1976, Gudrun Keussen was primarily responsible for designing the approximately 30 calendars produced by the publishing house. After the company was renamed arsEdition in 1980, the content shifted from religious themes to family-oriented ones.

Calendars designed by East Germans, such as Kurt Brandes and Fritz Baumgarten, were among those printed by the Korsch publishing house in Munich, which was founded in 1951. The Korsch publishing house bought many of its designs from other publishers and still offers many of the older designs today. Korsch also put marketing strategies into practice just like the imprint of firm names. Korsch is one of the most important and most successful publishing houses of its kind.

=== Doors and design ===
Supposedly the most popular figure of the conventional Advent calendars was born of a Protestant priest. He adapted the idea of Lang and hid pictures of figures from biblical stories behind 24 little doors. The calendar starting from December 1st with 24 little doors was finally accepted after 1945. Some calendars had more than one little door per date, with the 24 December often among them. The Advent Sundays could also have additional windows, in particular when they were out of the 24 days. The Secret of Christmas, a calendar designed by Paula Jordan, is a so-called Three Kings' calendar and even extended to the Feast of the Epiphany (6th of January). These calendars were offered by religious publishers in particular and were sold up until the 1960s.

Since 1995, Der Andere Advent was published by the ecumenical organization Andere Zeiten and is again an Advent calendar which follows the ecclesiastical year and therefore extends to the 6th of January. Since 2017, Der Andere Advent has an edition for children between the age of 7 and 11 which includes stories, experiments, comics and games. This Advent calendar gained nationwide popularity in the 1950s, when it was a mass-produced article that was offered at an affordable price. The designs were mainly scenes from romantic, snow-covered little towns. The big window of the 24th of December usually hid a nativity scene. There were also hand-painted Advent calendars by various artists, one example being the Advent calendars of Leipzig.

== The Nordic Julekalender/Julkalender ==
In Denmark, Finland, Iceland, Norway and Sweden, there is a tradition of having a Julekalender (Swedish: Julkalender, Finnish: Joulukalenteri, Icelandic: Jóladagatal; the local word for a Yule—or Christmas—calendar) in the form of a television or radio show, starting on December 1 and ending on Christmas Eve (December 24).

The first such show aired on radio in 1957 in the form of the Swedish radio series Barnens adventskalender. The first televised show of the genre aired in 1960 in the form of the Swedish program Titteliture. The first julekalender aired in Denmark was Historier fra hele verden in 1962. The televised julkalender or julekalendar has now extended into the other Nordic countries. In Finland, for example, the show is called Joulukalenteri.

Over the years, there have been several kinds of julekalender. Some are directed at children, some at both children and adults, and some directed at adults alone. There is a Julkalender radio show in Sweden, which airs in the days leading up to Christmas. A classic example of a julekalender enjoyed by children, as well as adults, if purely for nostalgic reasons, is the 1979 Norwegian television show Jul i Skomakergata. Another is the 1990 Icelandic television show Á baðkari til Betlehem.

== Commercial products ==
This 2017 Lego brand advent calendar originally sold for US$30.

In recent years, manufacturers have adopted advent calendar formats to promote their products, resulting in hundreds of advent calendars which include small versions of their products which have proven very popular with consumers. The contents range from simple little toys, or foodstuffs like miniature jars of jam, to luxury beauty products and fragrances, with packaging which retains holiday themes and usually the opening of a panel or a door, but generally omits strongly religious references.

As a result of both greater volume and higher average prices, the global market for advent calendars was 1.32 billion US$ in 2024.

== Image gallery ==
A collection of Advent calendars

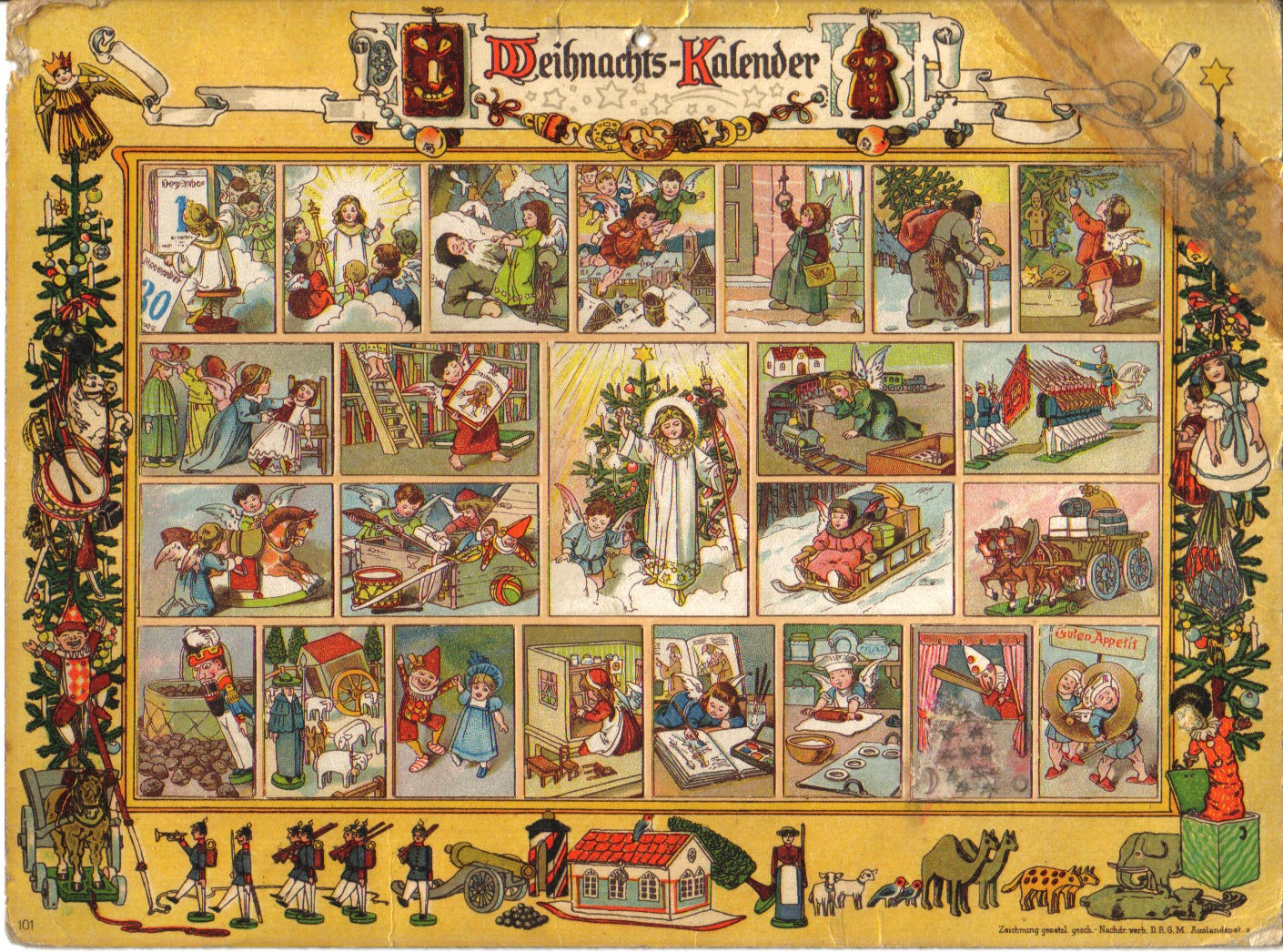
Advent calendar from Im Lande des Christkinds. The doors contain Christmas poems. Images, from a cut-out sheet, were pasted over them.

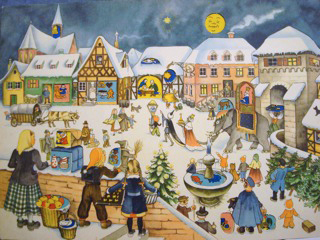
A 1946 Advent calendar by Marianne Schneegans

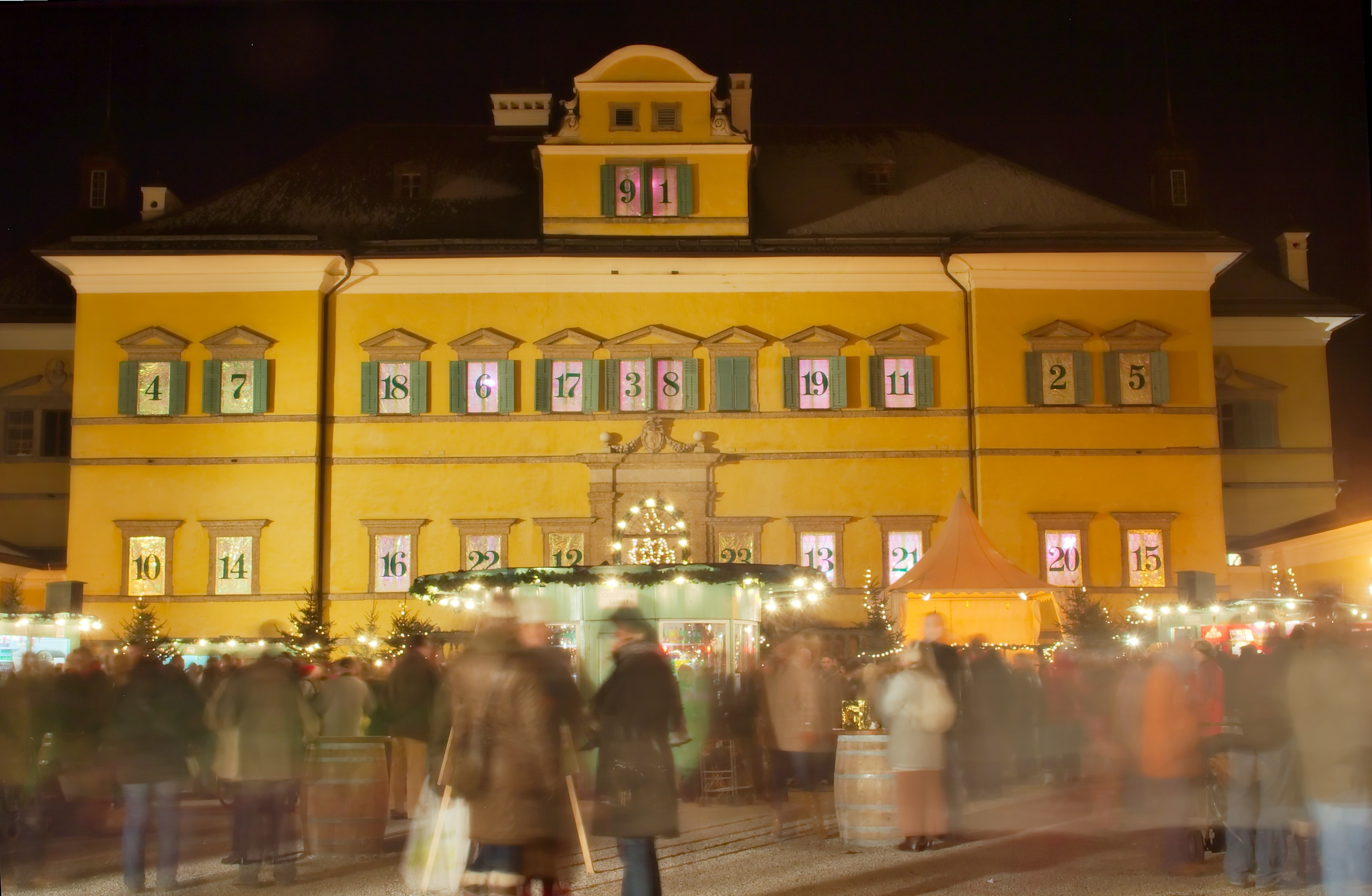
The 24 windows of the front of Hellbrunn Palace in Salzburg, Austria, used as an Advent calendar during the town's Christmas market

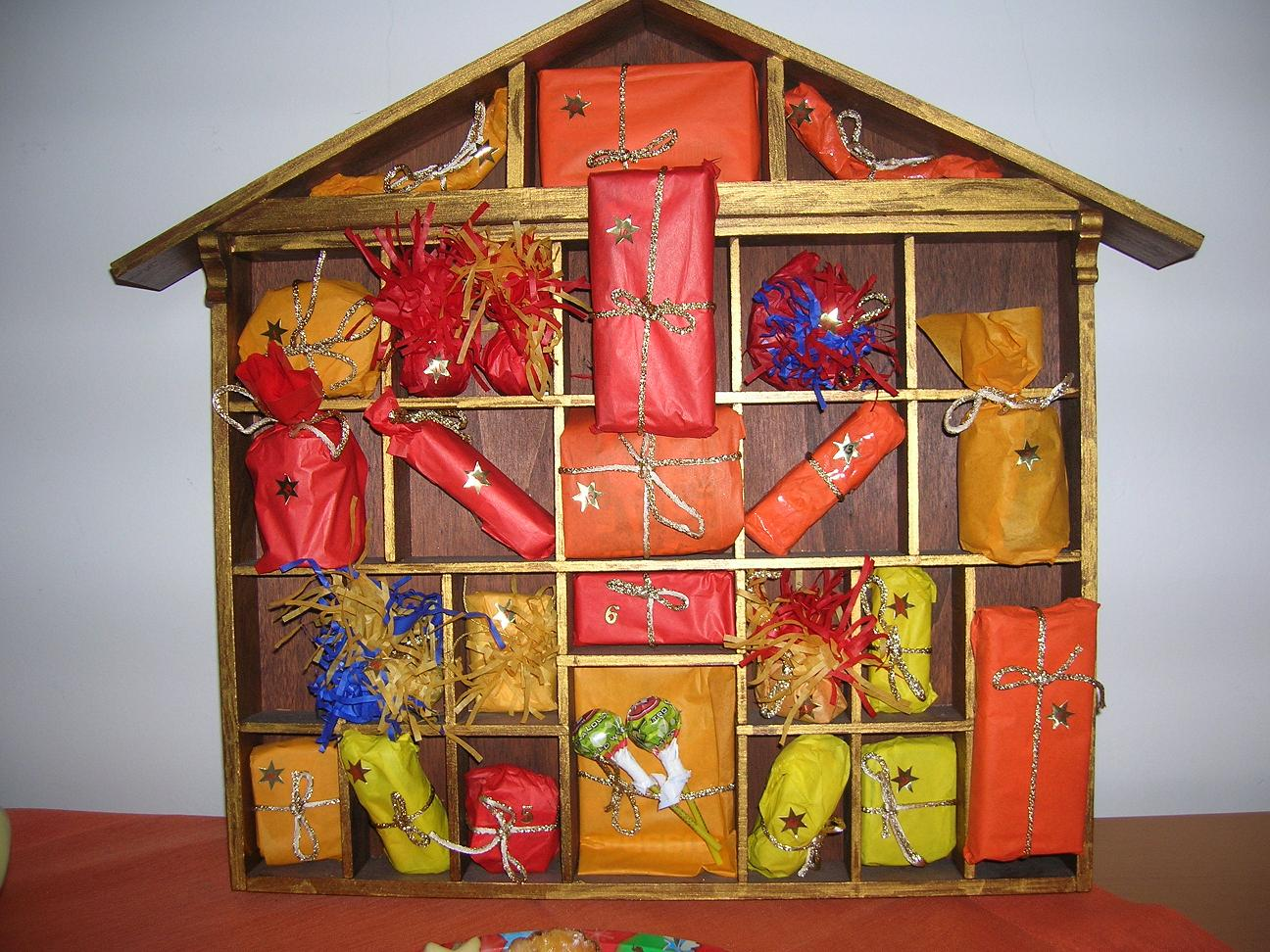
A home-made Advent calendar featuring presents

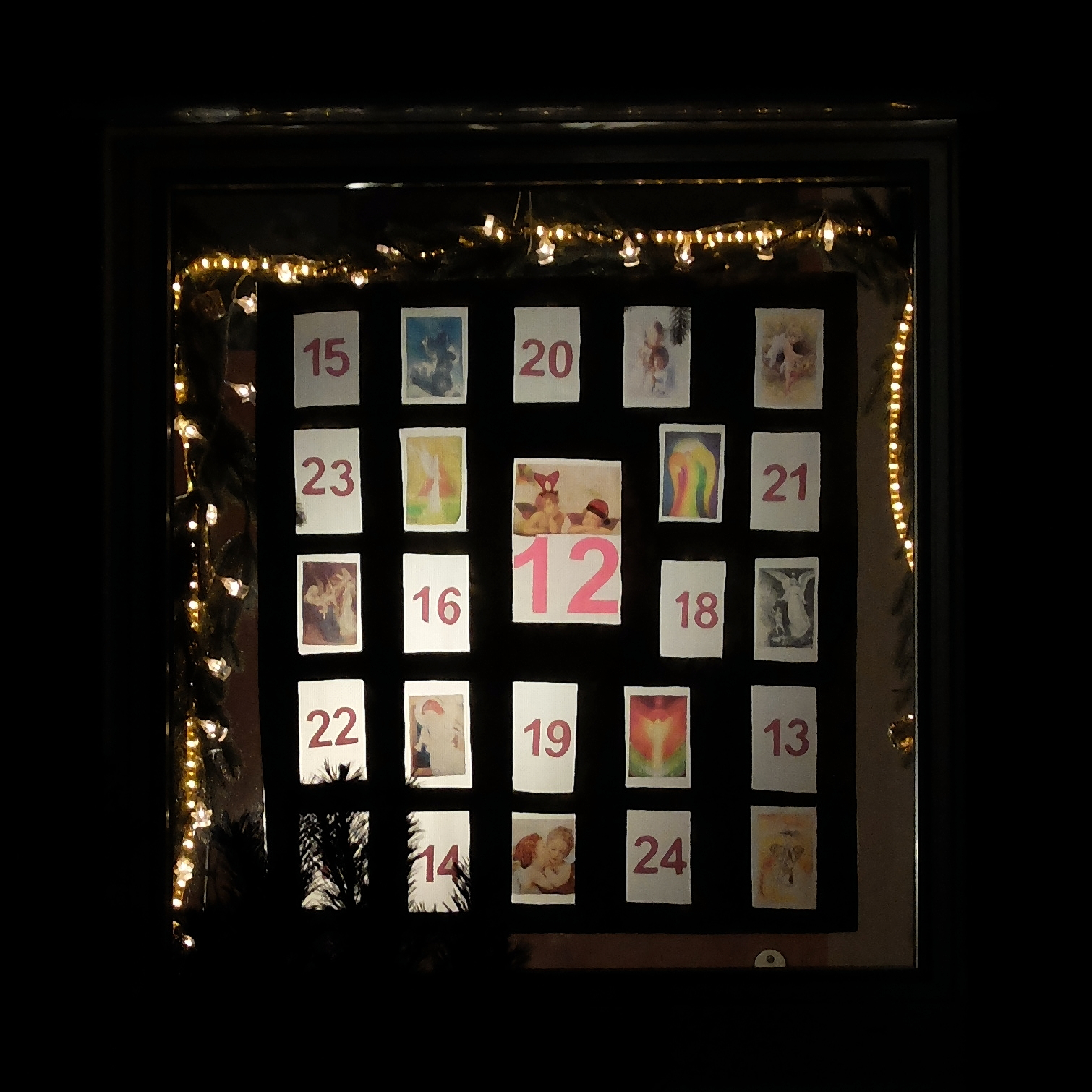
An Advent calendar consisting of images that have dates on the reverse side

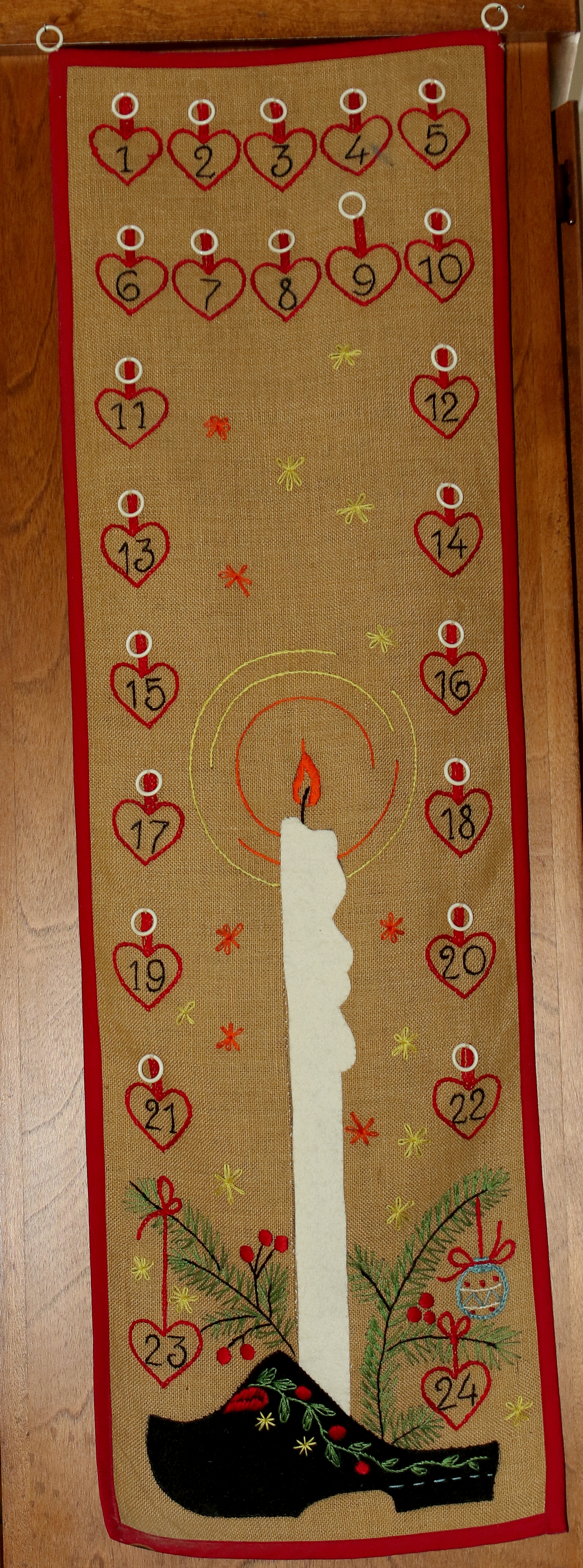
A Norwegian Advent calendar

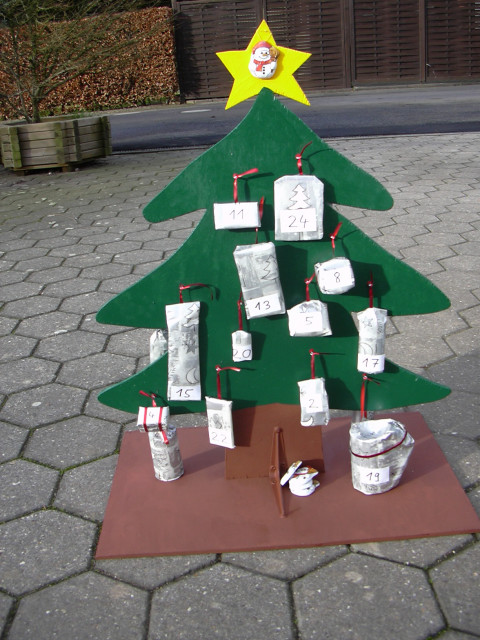
A home-made Advent calendar made from wood in the shape of a Christmas tree

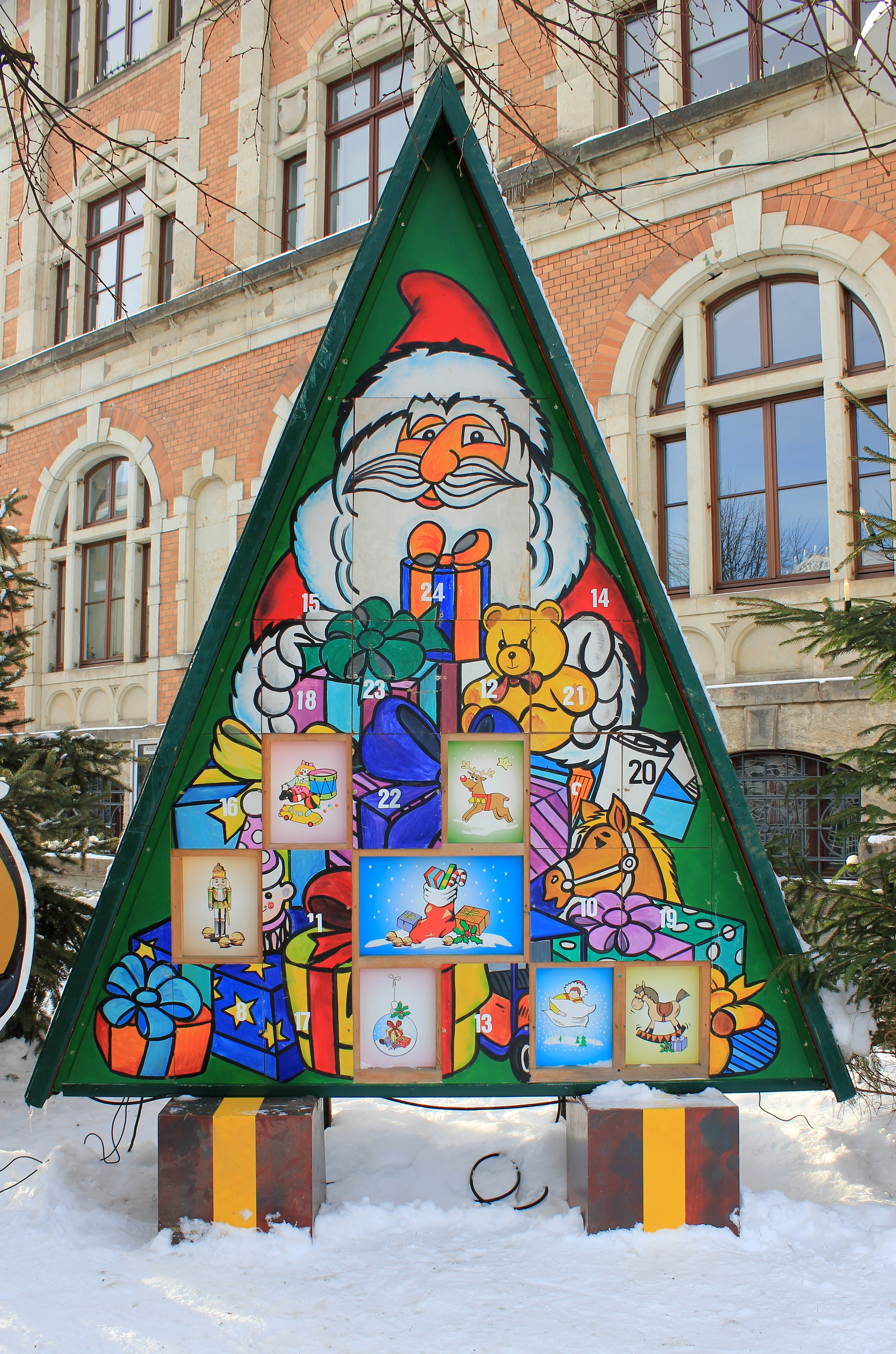
Advent Calendar at the City Hall in Stollberg, Saxony

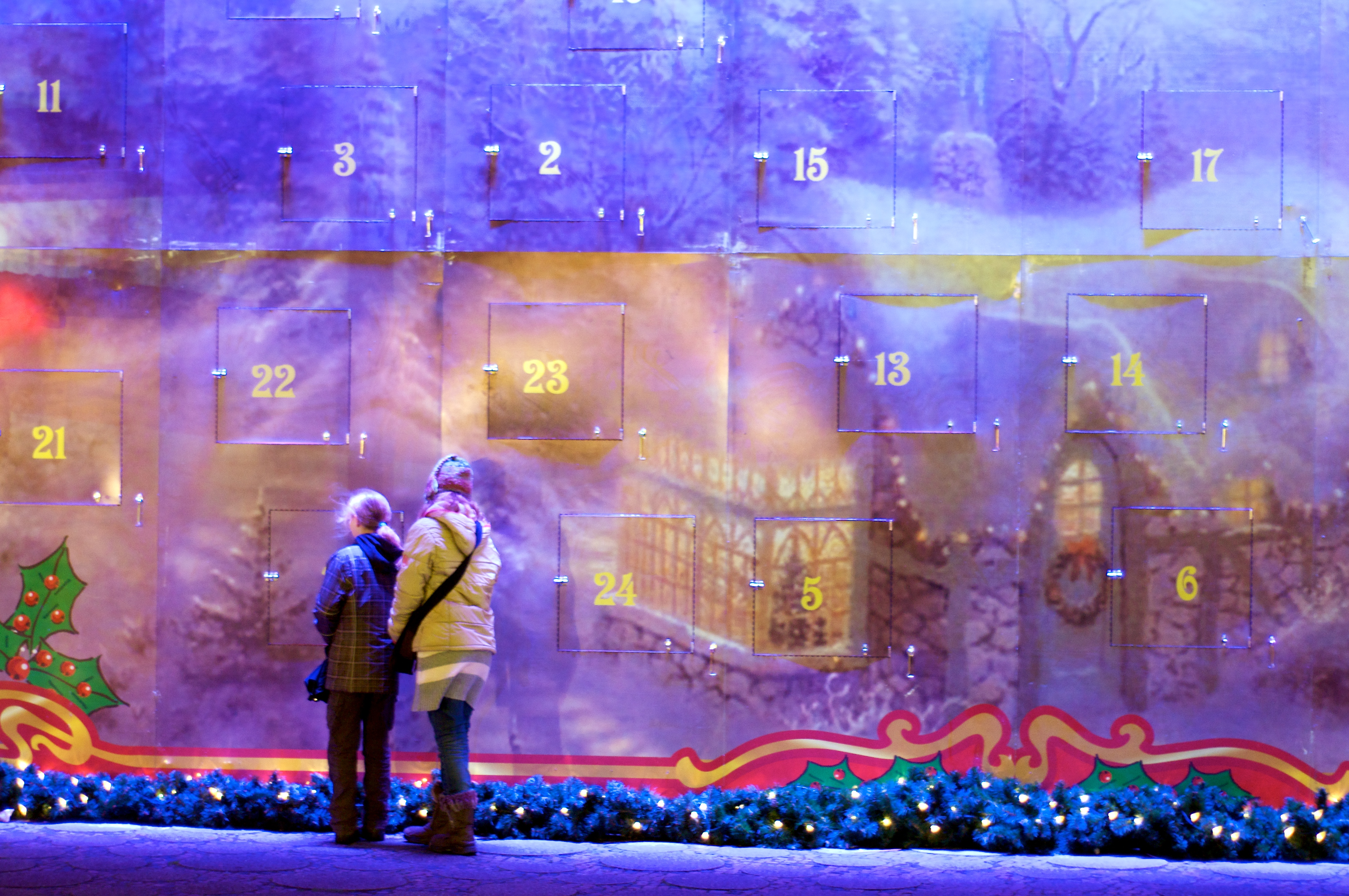
Two girls try to open the first door of an Advent calendar at the Kaiser Wilhelm Memorial Church in Berlin.

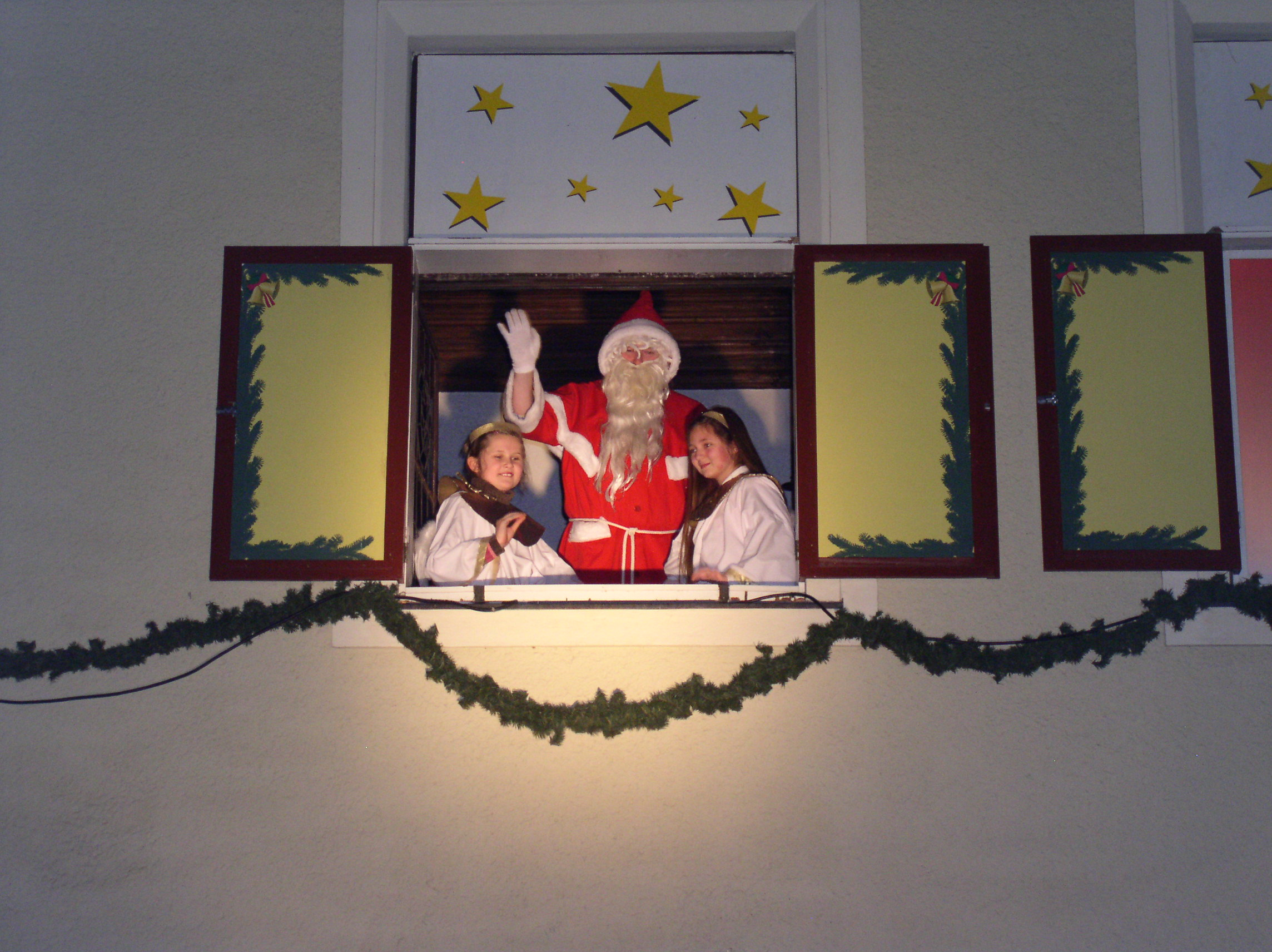
"Living" Advent calendar

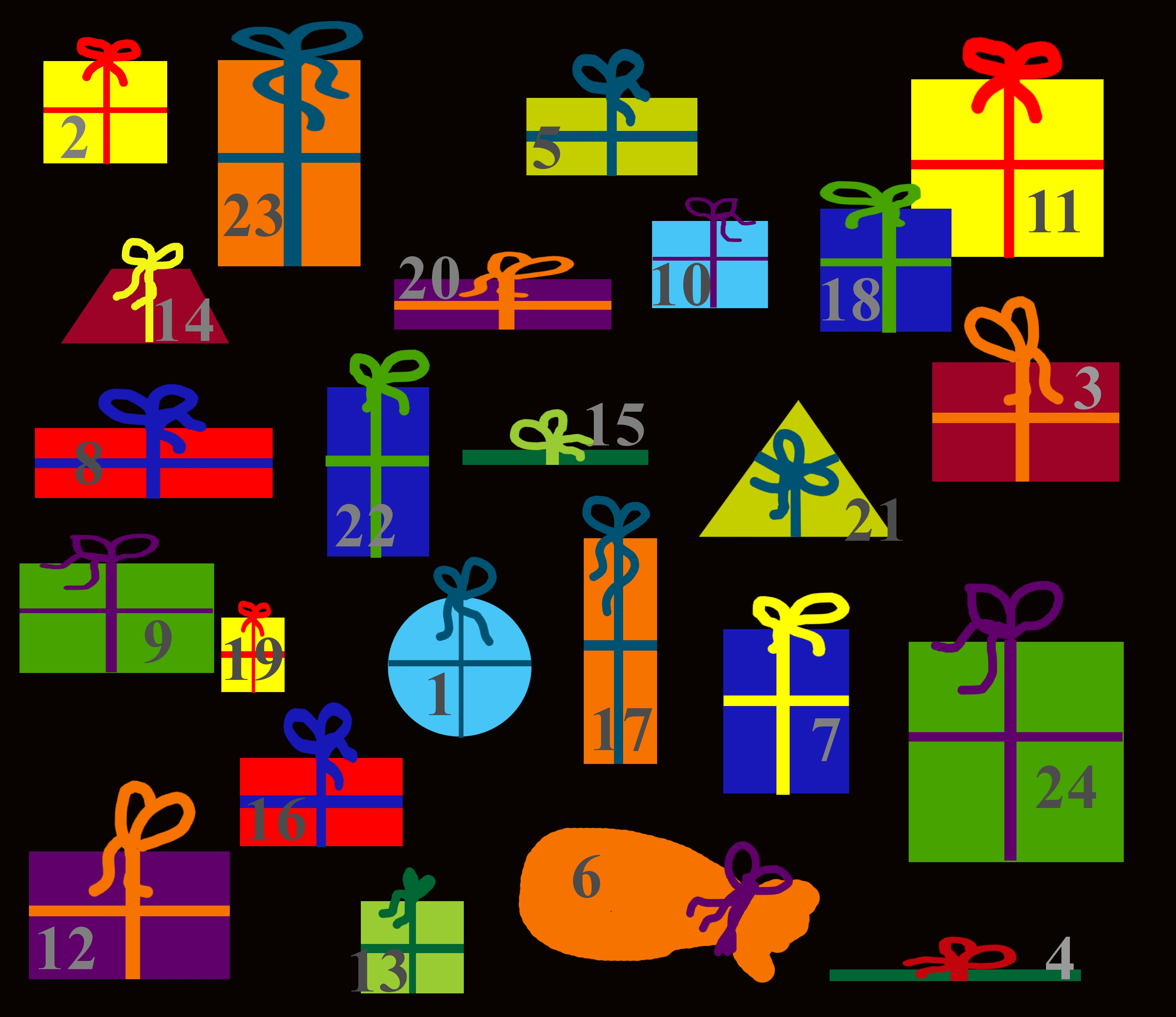
Advent calendar with presents as flaps, randomly arranged

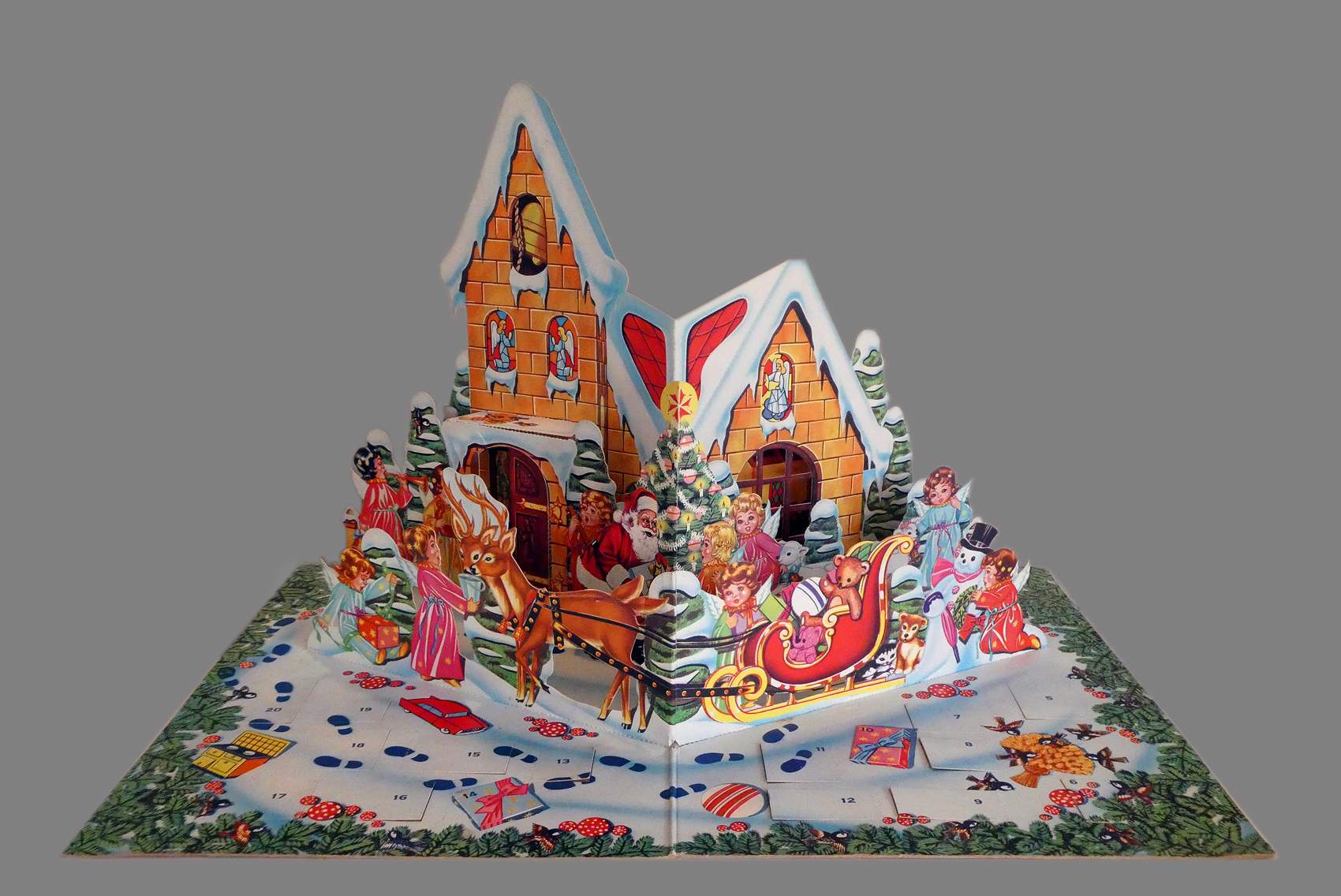
Stand-up Advent calendar by Carlsen Verlag, 1959

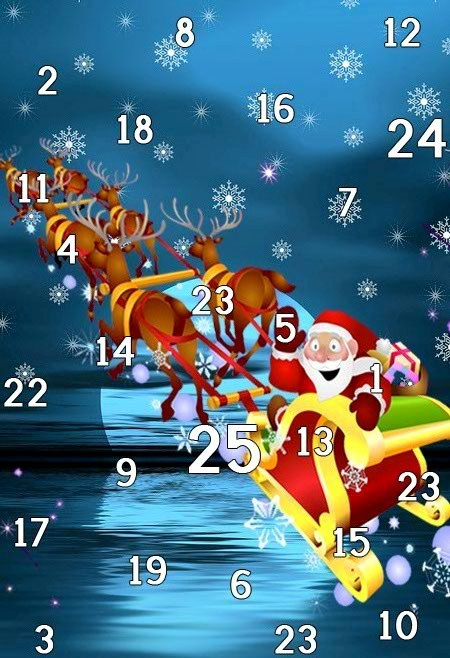
An Advent calendar featuring Santa Claus riding his sleigh

== See also ==
- Advent candle
- Advent daily devotional
- Advent wreath
- Christingle
- Lenten calendar
