= Margarete Seemann =

Austrian poet (1893–1949)

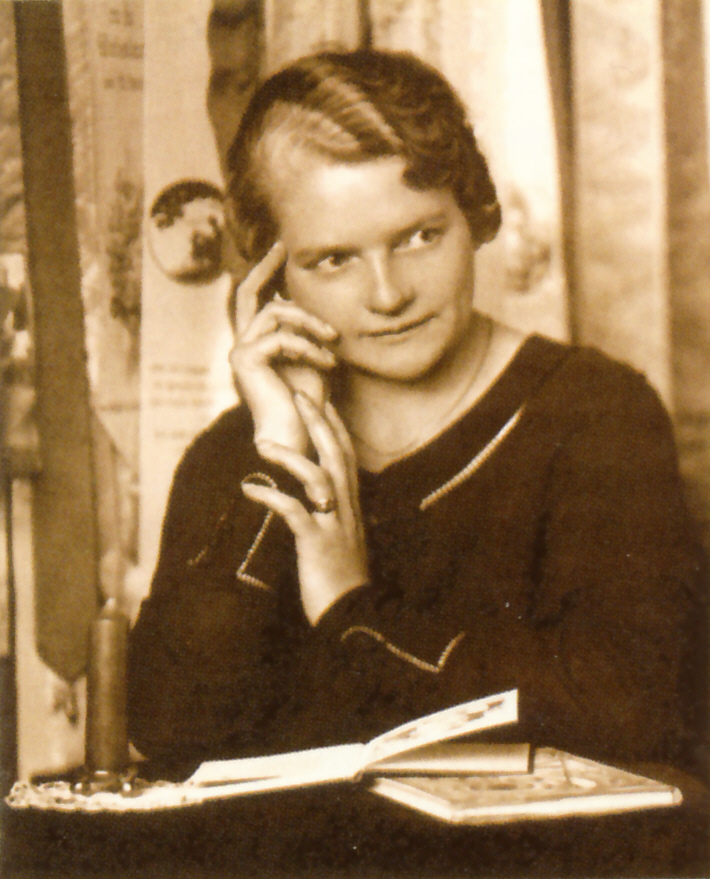
- Born: 26 July 1893; Vienna, Austria
- Died: 6 June 1949 (aged 55); Vienna, Austria
- Other names: Margmann
- Occupation: Poet
- Known for: Poems for children

Margarete Seemann aka Margmann (26 July 1893 – 6 June 1949) was an Austrian poet who wrote many books but is known for her poems for children.

== Life ==
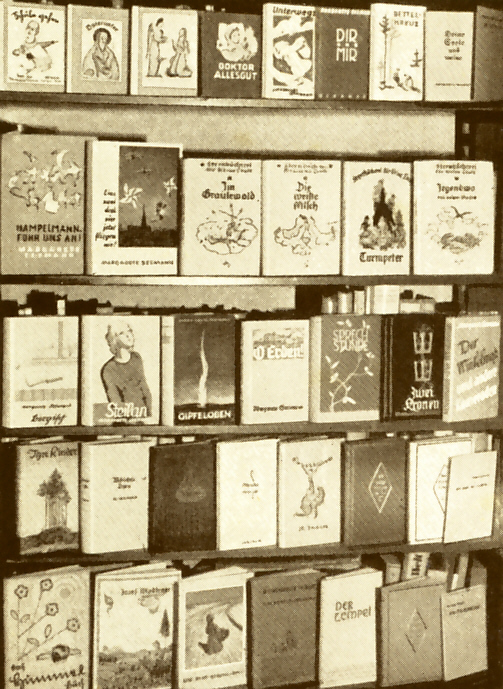
Margarete Seemann's books

Seemann was born in Vienna in 1893, one of the five children of a train attendant from South Moravia and a mother from Vienna. She came from a middle-class house and grew up in Vienna and in Guldenfurth, near Nikolsburg, in South Moravia. She went to school with the Ursulines and she became an elementary school teacher. As such, she was confronted with the reality of social and material hardship in the Viennese labor districts, she taught in Hernals and has lived in Meidling from 1937. She created fairy tales and other plays for children, written in the Catholic spirit to amuse and educate children. Readings from her books were very popular in the 1930s.

In December 1934, 50 of Seeman's poems were used to accompany a collection of drawings, titled Das Hummel-Buch, by Maria Innocentia Hummel and Seeman provided the poetic text. The pictures had already been published before as postcards. based on illustrations by Maria Innocentia Hummel. The figures in the drawings inspired pottery and in 1935 the popular Hummel figurines were marketed.

Her verses and stories for children have been decorated by well-known illustrators such as Ida Bohatta. Her books appeared in Catholic publishers and are still published today. Margarete Seemann developed bone cancer in 1937, from which she died in 1949 and she was buried in the Hetzendorfer cemetery, where she received an honorary grave from the city of Vienna.

Margarete Seemann used the nom de plume of "Margmann". She was called the "poet of the mothers" and the "Austrian Selma Lagerlöf". Sixty of her poems were set to music by various composers and her books were translated into seven languages. In addition to her children's books, she published poems and aphorisms.

Seemann died in Vienna in 1949, aged 55.
