= Verband deutscher Schriftstellerinnen und Schriftsteller =

Mostly with addition on the right side

The Verband deutscher Schriftstellerinnen und Schriftsteller (Association of German Writers) represents the interests of professional authors and writers in Germany and is part of the service sector trade union ver.di (former Printing and Paper Union). The VS, based in Berlin, was founded on 8 June 1969 with the support of Günter Grass, Heinrich Böll and Martin Walser as a merger of the "Bundesvereinigung der deutschen Schriftstellerverbände"", the "Verband deutscher Übersetzer" and the "Verband deutscher Kritiker" in Cologne. After a membership vote in October 2015, the association changed its original self-designation "Association of German Writers" to "association of German Writers".

== Organisational structure ==
With 3600 members, it is the largest federal association for authors and translators in Germany. It is divided into 15 regional associations (Lower Saxony and Bremen form a joint regional association) and the foreign group. The otherwise independent Verband deutschsprachiger Übersetzer literarischer und wissenschaftlicher Werke, VdÜ, is equivalent to a state association with its own executive committee and its own representation on the federal executive committee.

All full-time and part-time German-language authors, translators and all foreign-language writers living in the territory of the Federal Republic of Germany can become members. In the independent federal branch "Translators", persons can also be members who translate "from German or into German" regardless of their place of residence; furthermore, a status as candidate is possible.

In addition to its trade union tasks, the VS organises literary events, especially at district level, but also at the regular regional group meetings.

Furthermore, the VS is involved nationwide with projects on literature and politics, also in cooperation with other institutions such as Amnesty International. The most recent project was launched by the Federal Executive Committee in 2012. Under the motto "WORTE gegen RECHT", the VS is stepping up its nationwide activities against racism and Nazis with readings, poster campaigns and other events.

== Trade union services ==
The VS negotiates, among other things, Normvertrag with the Börsenverein des Deutschen Buchhandels - most recently on 23 -January 2014 inter alia with regulations on e-book rights -, gives recommendations on fee agreements with publishers and offers its members additional services such as free legal advice and legal protection via representation by the association. The association is also one of the main initiator associations of the Action Alliance for Fair Publishing (Ak Fairlag).

In addition to its trade union tasks, the VS organises literary events, especially at district level, but also at the regular regional group meetings. Furthermore, the VS is involved nationwide with projects on literature and politics, also in cooperation with other institutions such as Amnesty International. The most recent project was launched by the Federal Executive Committee in 2012. Under the motto "WORTE gegen RECHTS", the VS is stepping up its nationwide activities against racism and Nazis with readings, poster campaigns and other events.

== Federal Chairperson of the VS ==
- Dieter Lattmann (1969–1974)
- Horst Bingel (1974–1976)
- Carl Amery (1976–1977)
- Bernt Engelmann (1977–1983)
- Hans Peter Bleuel (1984–1987)
- Anna Jonas (1987–1988)
  - 1988/89 unoccupied (provisional board)
- Uwe Friesel (1989–1994)
- Erich Loest (1994–1997)
- Fred Breinersdorfer (1997–2005)
- Imre Török (2005–2015)
- Eva Leipprand (2015–2019)
- Lena Falkenhagen (since 16 February 2019)
