= Isabel Abedi =

American writer

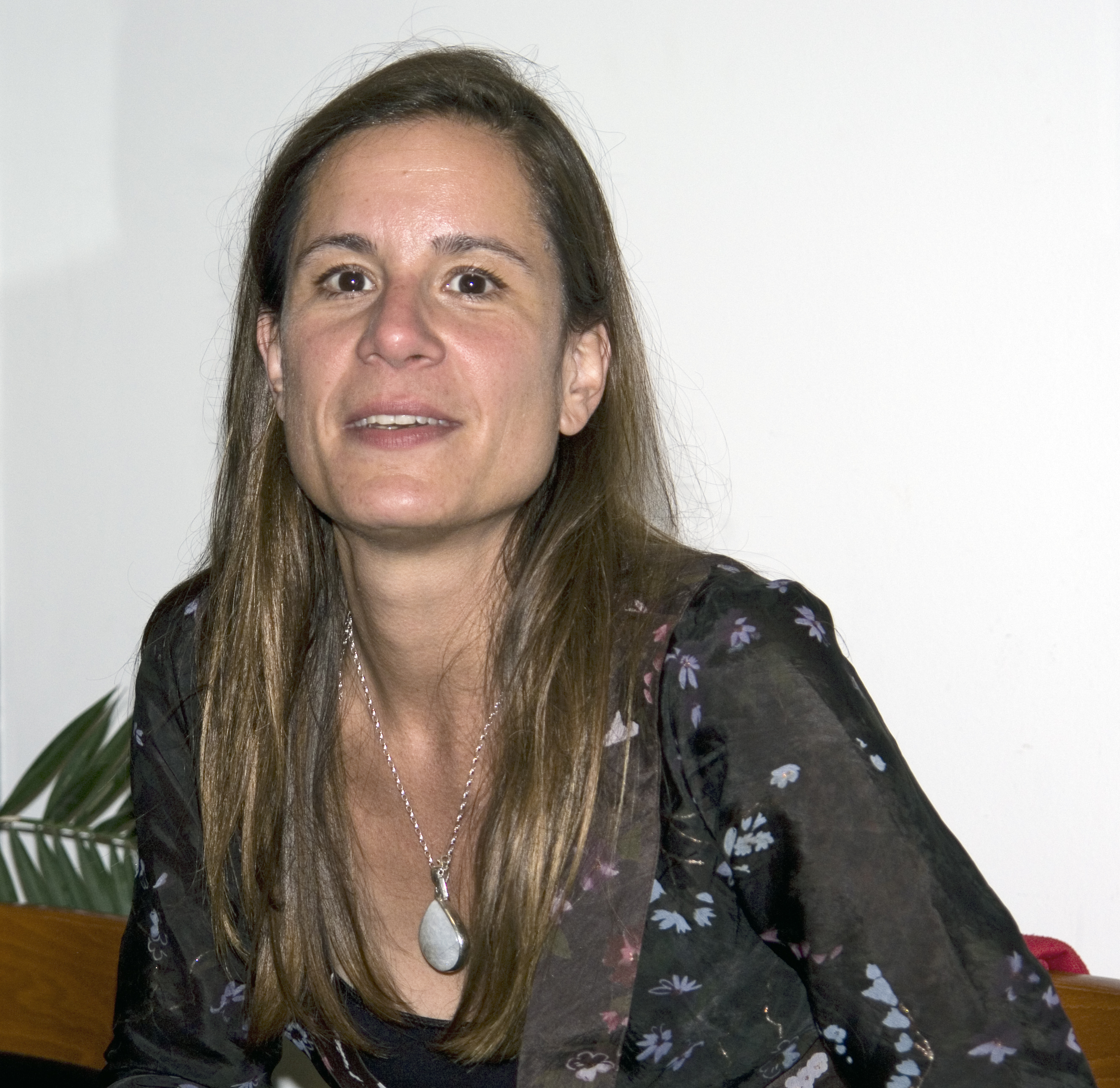
- Born: March 3, 1967 (age 59); Munich, Germany
- Occupations: Novelist, translator
- Children: 2
- Writing career
- Language: German
- Years active: 2006–present
- Genres: Young adult fiction, children's fiction
- Notable works: Whisper, Lola
- Notable awards: German Youth Book Prize, JuBu des Jahres, Golden Leslie
- Website: isabelabedibuecher.de

Isabel Nasrin Abedi (born March 3, 1967) is a German-Iranian writer of children's and young adult books, copywriter, and translator, best known for her German Youth Book Prize-winning novel Whisper, and her Lola series.

== Personal life ==
Abedi was born on March 3, 1967 in Munich but grew up in Düsseldorf. She wrote her first book in elementary school, for her mother, who worked as a copywriter during her childhood. Her favorite books growing up were The Brothers Lionheart by Astrid Lindgren, The Neverending Story by Michael Ende, Mary Poppins by P.L. Travers, as well as The Famous Five by Enid Blyton.

After graduating from high school, Abedi worked as an au pair and movie intern in Los Angeles for a year.

Abedi lives with her Brazilian musician partner and two daughters in Hamburg.

== Career ==
Abedi began making up stories when her first child had trouble falling asleep. She later wrote down the stories, which turned into her current publications. Abedi's books have been translated into 37 languages. She also translates from German to English, including works by Amy Giles, Camryn Garrett, and Dayna Lorentz.

Beyond writing Abedi has worked as a copywriter in Hamburg for thirteen years.

=== Whisper (2005) ===
Abedi's novel debut novel, Whisper, was published by Arena Verlag in June 2005. The book is about a girl investigating a mystery inside the holiday home she's staying in with her mother, encountering the ghost of a girl who lived there 30 years prior. It won the 2006 German Youth Book Prize.

=== Imago (2006) ===
Abedi's novel Imago, about a girl receiving an invitation to travel to another world, was first published in January 2006 by Arena Verlag. Abedi says it is partly inspired by her own life, since it is about a girl who grew up without a father.

=== Lucian (2008) ===
Abedi's novel Lucian, about a girl repeatedly dreaming about a mysterious boy, was first published by Arena Verlag in 2008. She wrote the novel while living in Venice Beach, inspired by the ocean. In 2010, it won second place in the Landshuter Jugendbuchpreis, and was nominated Buchliebling, an Austrian book prize.

=== Lola series (2004–2014) ===
Abedi's Lola series was first published in 2004 and spans nine novels, the last of which was published in 2014.

Lola was turned into a 2010 film, Hier Kommt Lola (transl. Here Comes Lola), starring Meira Durand, Felina Czycykowski, Fernando Spengler, and Nora Tschirner. The author had a cameo in the film's final scene.

=== The Longest Night (2016) ===
The Longest Night, Abedi's fifth YA novel, was published by Arena Verlag in 2016. It is about a 17-year-old girl finding mysterious sentences in her father's unpublished manuscript, which kicks off a trip across Europe that leads them to Italy.

Abedi wrote the book while staying in Chiusdino and Labastide Esparbairenque, and it took her seven years to finish. It won the student-chosen Rhineland-Palatinate youth book prize Golden Leslie in 2017.

=== Forbidden World (2022) ===
Abedi's novel Forbidden World, about a twelve-year-old boy and his sister who are being held captive in a mysterious castle, was released by Arena Verlag in 2022.

== Awards ==
| Year | Novel | Award | Result | Reference |
|---|---|---|---|---|
| 2005 | Imago | Wetzlar City Fantasy Award | Nominated | |
| 2006 | Whisper | German Youth Book Prize 2006 | Won | |
| 2008 | Isola | JuBu des Jahres | Won | |
| 2008 | Isola | Hansjörg-Martin Prize | Won | |
| 2010 | Lucian | Landshuter Jugendbuchpreis 2010 | 2nd Place | |
| 2010 | Lucian | Buchliebling | Nominated | |
| 2017 | The Longest Night | Golden Leslie 2017 | Won | |
