= Hohenfels, Konstanz =

Hohenfels
- Municipality
- Coat of arms

- Location of Hohenfels within Konstanz district
- Interactive map of Hohenfels
- Location within Germany Location within Baden-Württemberg
- Coordinates: 47°53′08″N 09°06′34″E
- Country: Germany
- State: Baden-Württemberg
- Admin. region: Freiburg
- District: Konstanz

Government
  - Mayor (2023–31): Florian Zindeler (CDU)

Area
  - Total: 30.49 km^{2} (11.77 sq mi)
- Elevation: 654 m (2,146 ft)

Population (2025-12-31)
  - Total: 2,248
  - Density: 73.73/km^{2} (191.0/sq mi)
- Time zone: UTC+01:00 (CET)
  - Summer (DST): UTC+02:00 (CEST)
- Postal codes: 78355
- Dialling codes: 07557, 07775, 07771
- Vehicle registration: KN
- Website: www.hohenfels.de

Hohenfels (German pronunciation: [ˈhoːənfɛls]) is a municipality in Konstanz district, in Baden-Württemberg, Germany.

== Geography ==
The municipal area is located north of Lake Constance on the eastern rim of the Hegau region, about 8 km (5.0 mi) east of Stockach. It includes the villages of Deutwang, Kalkofen, Liggersdorf, Mindersdorf, and Selgetsweiler.

== History ==
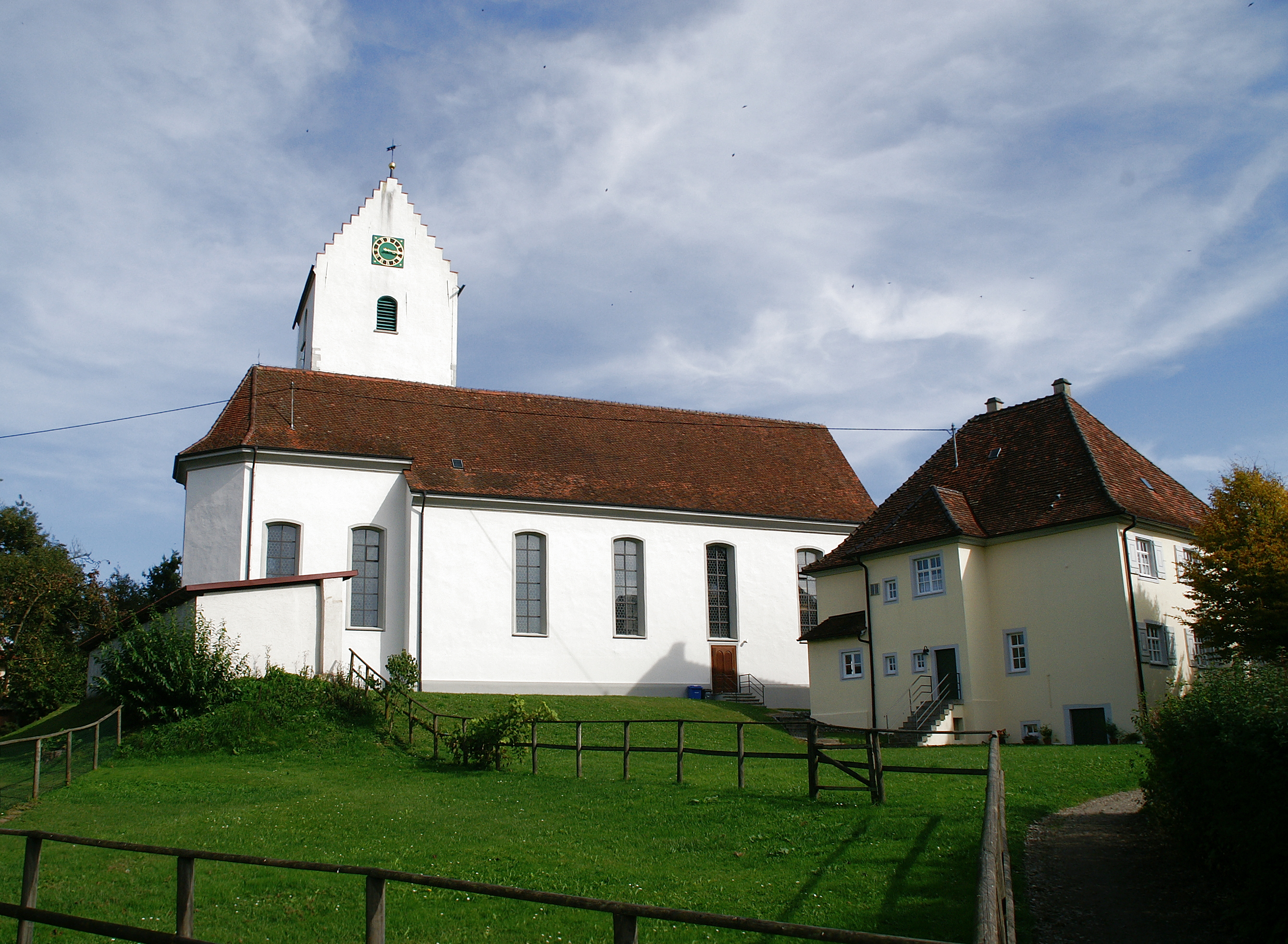
Liggersdorf parish church

In 1352 the Swabian lordship of Hohenfels around the 12th century New Hohenfels Castle was inherited by the noble House of Jungingen. Konrad von Jungingen (c. 1355–1407) and his brother Ulrich (1360–1410) served as Grand Masters of the Teutonic Knights; in 1506 the Teutonic Order purchased the Lordship of Hohenfels, which became part of the Altshausen commandry within the Alsace-Burgundy bailiwick.

After the German mediatisation in 1803, Hohenfels fell to the Principality of Hohenzollern-Sigmaringen and from 1850 was part of the Prussian Province of Hohenzollern.

== People ==
- Korbinian Brodmann (1868-1918), neurologist
- Christa Ludwig (* 1949), writer
