= Paula Jordan =

German Jewish art dealer

- Born: Paula Frank; 17 May 1889; Bad Bocklet, Germany
- Died: 25 November 1941 (aged 52); Kaunas, Lithuania
- Cause of death: Gunshot
- Occupation: Art dealer
- Spouse: Siegfried Jordan (m. 1921)
- Children: 1

Paula Jordan (née Frank; 17 May 1889 – 25 November 1941) was a German Jewish art dealer who was murdered in the Holocaust.

== Life and death ==
Paula Frank was born in Steinach an der Saale as daughter of the Jewish merchant Lazarus Frank. During World War I she served as a nurse. On 16 December 1921 she married Siegfried Jordan (born on 18 July 1889), the son of a Munich cattle trader. On 5 October 1923 Peter, the only son of the couple, was born. For two decades, the couple owned an art gallery in Prinzregentenstraße 2, across the street from the Haus der Kunst. They exhibited and sold works of arts across Germany, mainly in spas like Bad Kissingen or beach resorts like Norderney. In 1925, the family moved into their apartment in Mauerkircherstraße 13 (Herzogpark). The so-called Reichskristallnacht changed their life fundamentally. Siegfried Jordan was arrested and kept interned for some days in the Dachau concentration camp, the furniture from their apartment was confiscated, the cultural climate became very hostile for all Jews. In May 1939, their son Peter successfully emigrated to England. Siegfried was a dyed-in-the-wool Bavarian and could not imagine leaving his homeland. He cycled through the landscapes and love to go skiing in Lenggries. "My father was very attached to Bavaria," his son later-on remembered. "That's why he did not want to know what actually happened." The couple lost their gallery and their apartment. On 20 November 1941, Siegfried and Paula Jordan were deported to Lithuania, together with thousand Jews from Munich. The train was originally bound to Riga, but never arrived there. The Jordans and all other passengers were shot immediately after arrival in Kaunas, on 25 November 1941.

His son Peter Jordan survived the Shoah in England and remained there after the fall of the Nazi regime. He lives in Manchester, together with his wife.

== Stolpersteine ==
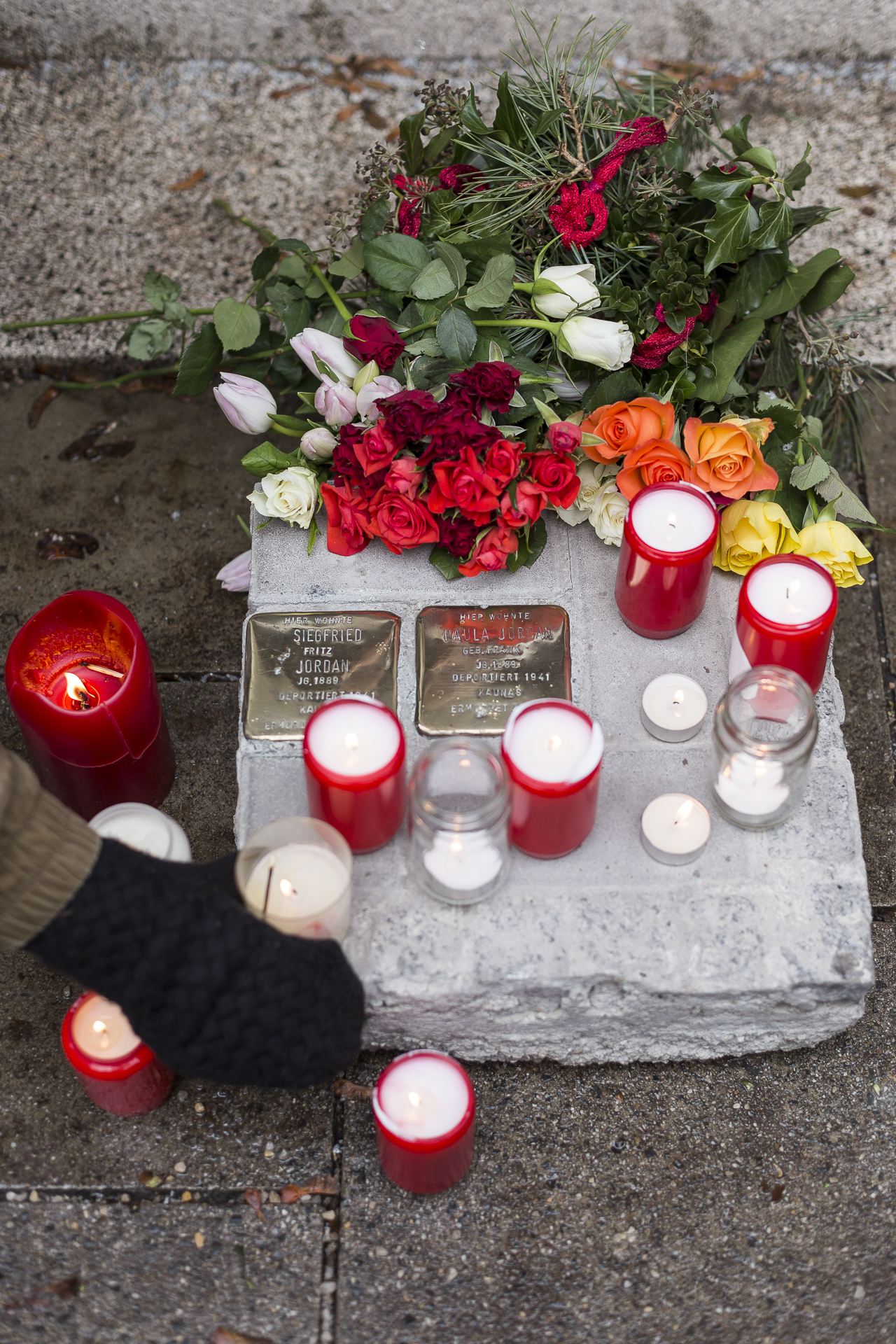
Symbolic laying of the Stolpersteine for Paula and Siegfried Jordan in front of the victims home, 15 January 2017

The research of pupils of the Luisengymnasium in Munich-Bogenhausen led to the collocation of two Stolpersteine for Paula Jordan and her husband in 2004. The action was fiercely disputed. The City Council of Munich does not approve of any stumbling blocks on public grounds and removed them two months after the collocation. Both artist Gunter Demnig, who created and posed them, and Peter Jordan were upset and called this act an equivalent to a second deportation. The Stolpersteine for Paula and Siegfried Jordan were thereafter exhibited at the former Führerbau (from 2005 to 2011) and are now shown by the Haus der Geschichte, the House of History in Bonn (since 2015).

Peter Jordan filed a lawsuit against the City of Munich in order to achieve the permanent collocation of the two Stolpersteine in front of the building where he and his parents lived for fifteen years. After he lost the case, he asked for a symbolic laying of the Stolpersteine for one day. This took place on 15 January 2017, with Peter Jordan, then 93, and his wife being present.
