= Anna Jonas =

German women's activist and educator (1839–1900)

Anna Vorwerk (1 April 1839 in Königslutter – 18 November 1900 in Wolfenbüttel) was a German women's rights activist, pedagogue and founder of the castle school in Wolfenbüttel.

== Life and work ==
Anna Vorwerk came from a respected and wealthy middle-class family. Her father became a senior judge at the regional high court in Wolfenbüttel in 1851. She had a musical talent from an early age and was a pupil of Johannes Brahms and Hans von Bülow during her stays in Berlin and Hamburg. When the Vorwerks arrived, there was already a six-class girls' school in the city, which she attended as a pupil. This was not a matter of course in the middle of the 19th century. Around 1865/66, she met Henriette Breymann, who gave lectures on the experiments and ideas of Friedrich Fröbel. Finally, on 2 May 1866, she founded the "Association for Education" together with Breymann. This opened a kindergarten in Wolfenbüttel Palace and the Anna-Vorwerk School for Girls on 15 May. The school was also located in the palace, which since 1970 has been home to the Gymnasium im Schloss, which has long been open to girls and boys and is attended by around 1500 pupils. In 1870 there were already three elementary classes. After a disagreement between the two teachers, Vorwerk took over the management of the castle school from 1870, which also provided a teacher training seminar. She continuously expanded this girls' school, adding a trade school in 1880, a training centre for needlework and gymnastics teachers in 1884 and a domestic science school in 1890. From 1887, she was the publisher of the Blätter aus dem Schlosse. Vorwerk also set up an after-work house for retired female teachers in 1896. In order to improve scientific education opportunities for women, her efforts led to the establishment of a special training course for female teachers at the Universität Göttingen. In the autumn of 1900, she succumbed to a serious illness in the Feierabendhaus. She is considered an important pioneer of the emerging women's movement, which campaigned for a better education for girls.

== Writings (selection) ==
- Zur Oberlehrerinnenfrage: Ein Wort des Friedens. Wollermann, Wolfenbüttel 1888, (online).
- Fünfundzwanzig Jahre der Arbeit im alten Schlosse zu Wolfenbüttel. A review for the friends and children of the house. In: Blätter aus dem Schlosse. Wolfenbüttel 1891, OCLC 247351576.
- My memories of Johannes Brahms. In: Blätter aus dem Schlosse. Sommerblatt No. 40. Wolfenbüttel 1897; also in: Schweizerische Lehrerinnen-Zeitung. 2nd vol. 1897-1898, no. 2 doi:10.5169/seals-309970.
