= Goethe-Gymnasium, Dortmund =

Gymnasium and secondary school in Dortmund, North Rhine-Westphalia, Germany

Location
- Stettiner Straße 12; Dortmund, North Rhine-Westphalia; Germany; 51.4797°N 7.4924°E

Information
- School type: State gymnasium
- Founded: 1867
- Language: German
- Website: goethe-gymnasium-dortmund.de

The Goethe-Gymnasium is a gymnasium and secondary school in Dortmund, North Rhine-Westphalia, Germany. It was founded as a school for girls in 1867, as the first school offering higher education to girls in the city. It was later named after Johann Wolfgang von Goethe. It has been a NRW Sportschule, focused on sports, from 2009.

== History ==
The school was founded as the first school of higher education for girls in Dortmund in 1867, then called Evangelische städtische höhere Mädchenschule (Protestant municipal higher school for girls). It was the first school of higher education in Dortmund, one of the first in the Ruhr region. The limitation by denomination was dropped in 1877 when the school became the Städtische höhere Mädchenschule. With rising numbers of pupils, the school was moved to Dortmund-Hörde in 1879. In the 1890s, the aspect of school education as preparation for a future job was added, providing the girls mainly with skills to become teachers.

In 1908, education for girls was reformed in Prussia, accepting the schools of higher education for girls (Lyceum) as sufficient for admission to academic studies. A reference to Johann Wolfgang von Goethe appeared first in 1918, and became an official name in 1928, Städtisches Goethe-Oberlyzeum zu Dortmund (Municipal Goethe upper lyceum at Dortmund). It moved to a new building at Skellstraße in 1960. The complex of three buildings connected by covered corridors was designed by three architects from Dortmund, Otto-Heinz Groth, Werner Lehmann and Wolfram Schlote.

The school was moved again to the present building in Stettiner Straße in 1983. The school was approved in 2008 as a NRW Sportgymnasium, a school with a focus on competitive sports in North Rhine-Westphalia. A new hall for sports was built, and opened in 2013. It offers up to 199 seats for spectators, and is open also for other regular users such as the teams of the TV Hörde for volleyball and basketball.
