= Maria Innocentia Hummel =

German Franciscan sister (1909–1946)

Maria Innocentia Hummel OSF
- Hummel in 1934
- Born: Berta Hummel; 21 May 1909; Massing, Germany
- Died: 6 November 1946 (aged 37); Bad Saulgau, Germany
- Education: Academy of Applied Arts in Munich
- Occupations: Franciscan sister; artist
- Known for: Painting the basis for Hummel figurines

Maria Innocentia Hummel OSF (born Berta Hummel; 21 May 1909 – 6 November 1946) was a German religious sister of the Third Order of Saint Francis and an artist. She is noted for her paintings which were the basis for Hummel figurines.

== Early life ==
Born in Massing, Germany, as Berta Hummel, one of the six children of Adolf and Victoria Hummel, living above her father's dry goods store. As a child Berta showed creative talent, and developed a reputation in the village as the local artist. She was a cheerful, active girl, who loved the outdoors and winter sports. Her father encouraged her artistic talents and, at age 12, enrolled her in a boarding school of the Sisters of Loreto in Simbach am Inn, about 30 kilometres away. Hummel continued to grow in her abilities, and after graduation in 1927 she enrolled in the prestigious Academy of Applied Arts in Munich, where her talent and skills developed.

Hummel was a devout Catholic and instead of the standard student housing, she chose to live in a Catholic residence run by religious sisters. While living there, she made friends with two members of the Congregation of the Franciscan Sisters of Sießen in Bad Saulgau who were also studying at the Academy. The congregation focuses on teaching, and gives great emphasis to the role of art in education. After Berta graduated in 1931 with top honors, she chose to follow a religious calling that she had felt for some time and applied to enter that congregation, and was admitted in April 1931 as a postulant. Berta made one final visit to her family home in late May, spending two weeks with them. On 22 August, she was admitted as a novice and received the habit of the congregation and the religious name Maria Innocentia.

== Life in the convent as an artist ==
After completing her novitiate year, Hummel was assigned to teach art in a nearby school run by the convent. Though her days were busy teaching, Hummel spent her spare time painting pictures of children. The sisters were impressed with her art and sent copies to Emil Fink Verlag, a publishing house in Stuttgart which specialized in religious art, to which Hummel reluctantly agreed. The company decided to release copies of the works in postcard form, which were popular in the early 20th century. In 1934, it also published a collection of her drawings, titled Das Hummel-Buch, with poetic text by the Austrian writer Margarete Seemann.

Soon afterward, Franz Goebel, the owner of a porcelain company, was looking for a new line of artwork, and happened to see some of these postcards in a shop in Munich. Hummel agreed, mostly for its saving the employment of many workers, and the convent granted him sole rights to make figurines based on her art. Interest in the figurines increased after they were displayed in 1935 at the Leipzig Trade Fair, a major international trade show. A decade later, the figurines would gain popularity in the United States when returning American soldiers brought them home.

In 1937, two events in Hummel's life were to mark her future. On 30 August, she made her perpetual vows. Also, she had released a painting titled The Volunteers, which drew the enduring hatred of Adolf Hitler. Leading Nazis attacked the art, denouncing the depiction of German children as "hydrocephalic, clubfooted goblins". Although the Nazi authorities allowed Hummel to work, they banned the distribution of her art in Germany. One Nazi magazine, Der SA-Mann (issue of 23 March 1937), wrote of her work: "There is no place in the ranks of German artists for the likes of her" and: "No, the beloved Fatherland cannot remain calm when Germany's youth are portrayed as brainless sissies".

Significantly, Hummel also drew sketches that contained the Star of David, a dangerous theme in those times. She portrayed angels in gowns covered with slightly skewed six-pointed stars. She also designed a series of Old and New Testament symbols for the convent chapel in 1938–39. She symbolized the juncture of the two Testaments by designing a cross with a menorah before it.

== Wartime suffering and death ==
In 1940, the Nazi government closed all religious schools, including those of Siessen. Later that year, it seized the convent itself, forcing most of the community to leave. Out of a community of some 250 sisters, the 40 sisters who were allowed to remain were confined to a small section of the convent, living there without heat and without any means to support themselves. Hummel returned to her family at this time, but within three months so missed community life that she asked to be allowed to return. The Superior, Mother Augustine, allowed her to do so.

Hummel was given a small cell which served as both sleeping quarters and her studio. The Nazis took half of the money generated by her work, but the remaining funds were the main source of income of the sisters there. Food was scarce and it was very cold in the winter. Mother Augustine later wrote of that period, "What we suffered was indescribable".

Hummel was diagnosed with tuberculosis in 1944 and was sent twice to a sanatorium in Isny im Allgäu. She returned to the convent after five months, just before the region was liberated by the Free French Forces. She did not recover, and died on 6 November 1946, aged 37. She was buried in the convent cemetery.

== Legacy ==
Goebel, his team of artists, and a board of sisters from the convent carried on her legacy through the figurines, all of which were based on her artwork. Goebel Germany discontinued the figures in October 2008.

Innocentia's sister, Centa Hummel, established the Berta-Hummel-Museum in the family home in Massing. Centa died September 2011, just before her 100th birthday, and the management of the museum passed to her son. One of the children depicted in her work, Sieglinde Schoen, established The Hummel Museum in New Braunfels, Texas, in the United States, which displayed about 280 of Hummel's original pieces. These pieces had been stored in Switzerland by a private collector during the War. The museum discontinued as a venue of Hummel's work in 2001.

== See also ==
- List of German women artists
