= Andreas Untersberger =

Austrian painter

Andreas Untersberger (1874–1944) was an Austrian painter who worked under the pseudonym A. Juenger. He created hundreds of illustrations for Catholic children's books and holy cards.

== Family tree ==
Andreas Untersberger was the eighth son of a wood carver from Upper Austria, who made altars and other religious and liturgical objects. He was the brother of Josef August Untersberger (1864–1933), who had gained some fame in the 1920s as a sculptor and painter of religious images under the pseudonym "Giovanni."

== Career ==
Andreas Untersberger first worked under his father. At the age of 16 he was assisting him in the building of an altar in Knittelfeld; Josef Untersberger worked in the Neo-Romanic style. He distinguished himself in a local art exhibit in Austria; began work in Munich, Germany, in various workshops; and was noted as having painted three paintings in Odrovice, modern day Czech. By the turn of the century, Jugendstil became all the rage, and the church no longer gave out big assignments. Josef Untersberger gave up the family business, and his son Andreas moved to Vienna.

From 1895 to 1899 Untersberger studied at the University of Applied Arts Vienna, where he presumably became schooled in the style of the Jugendstil. From 1901 to 1905 he traveled back and forth between Munich and Vienna, until he settled for good in Munich in 1905. He joined artists' societies, locally in Munich and nationally in Berlin, and garnered good reviews of his work, including some non-religious paintings which were on exhibition in the Glasspalast. In 1932, his work was part of the exhibition in the Deutsches Museum.

== Religious art ==
In the first two decades of the twentieth century Untersberger illustrated many children's books, many of them religious, including books used in Catholic education.

In the last decades of his life he worked almost exclusively for Ars Sacra, a German publishing company, where he illustrated children's books and religious material according to very strict guidelines. He made more than 400 illustrations for holy cards, which, until the press was secularized in 1980, were reprinted again and again. Presumably it was Liane Müller, the director of the press, who suggested Untersberger use the pseudonym "A. Juenger," in order to avoid confusion between Andreas and his older brother, who had a reputation of producing "kitsch." It appears that in the last years of his life his work went exclusively to Ars Sacra, since after the Gleichschaltung religious art became more and more suppressed.
