= Hummel figurines =

Series of porcelain figurines

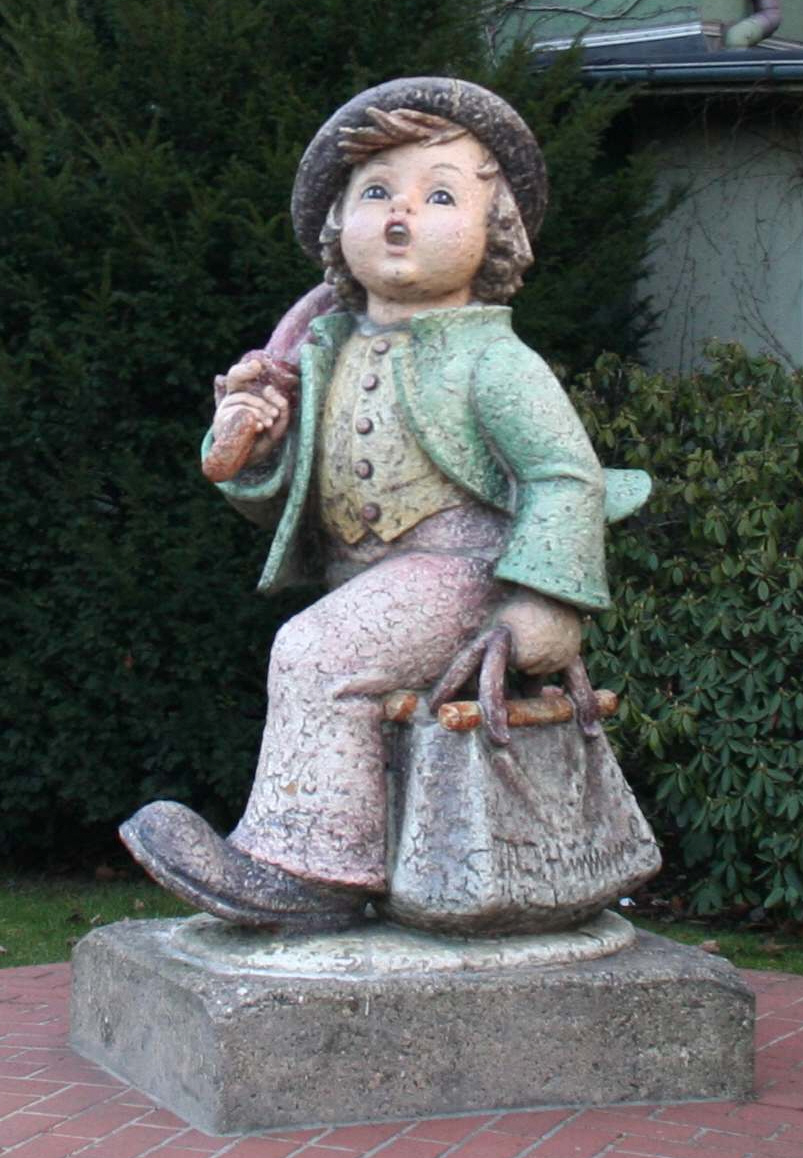
Life-size reproduction of a Hummel figurine "Merry Wanderer" at the entrance of the Goebel company in Rödental, Germany

Hummel figurines (also known as M. I. Hummel figurines or simply Hummels) are a series of porcelain figurines based on the drawings of Maria Innocentia Hummel.

== History ==
The sketch art of Maria Innocentia Hummel began to appear in the 1930s in Germany and Switzerland, mostly pastoral drawings of children. The German art publisher Ars Sacra was involved in the early popularization of the art on postcards. Hummel's "art cards" became popular throughout Germany, catching the eye of Franz Goebel, porcelain maker and head of W. Goebel Porzellanfabrik. Goebel acquired rights to turn Hummel's drawing into figurines, producing the first line in 1935. The figurines were introduced at the Leipzig Trade Fair, a major European show for the industry. Goebel was known for presenting new and novel products that attracted American distributors. By the end of the year, 46 M. I. Hummel motifs were on the market, in America sold at Marshall Field & Co. of Chicago and other retailers.

After the end of World War II, the popularity of Hummel figurines grew as American soldiers stationed in West Germany began sending the figurines home as gifts. Nostalgia associated with the figurines and the U.S. soldiers buying them led to Hummel figurines becoming a popular collector's item. Popularity increased even more when the figurines were sold by the Army PX system. As travel to Europe became more commonplace, the figurines, with their folkloric appearance, were often purchased as souvenirs. A vibrant speculator market in Hummel figurines developed in the 1970s, and Hummel figurines skyrocketed in price. M. I. Hummel collector plates made by Goebel and sold by the Goebel Collectors Club, were a prominent item in the Bradford Exchange, an American supplier of collectible plates. Today, figurine offerings include traditional M. I. Hummel figurines, special limited editions, a figurine series featuring Swarovski crystal elements, the Hope Series that donates a portion of the proceeds to the American National Breast Cancer Foundation, Annual Angels, and more. In the United States, prices for authentic M. I. Hummel figurines range from just over $100 for simple figurines to well over $1,000 for larger and more intricate pieces. There is also an active second-hand market for the figurines.

Production of Hummel figurines by Goebel was taken over in early 2009 by Manufaktur Rödental GmbH under the direction of Jörg Köster. Following the 2013 bankruptcy of Manufaktur Rödental, a new international management team took over the M. I. Hummel figurine business in 2014. Figurine production continued in Germany under Hummel Manufaktur GmbH, with North American distribution handled by Newboden Brands. M. I. Hummel figurines continue to be produced in the original factory in Rödental, Germany, where they have been made since 1935. They are still created with the strict oversight of the Convent of Siessen, where M. I. Hummel lived and worked.

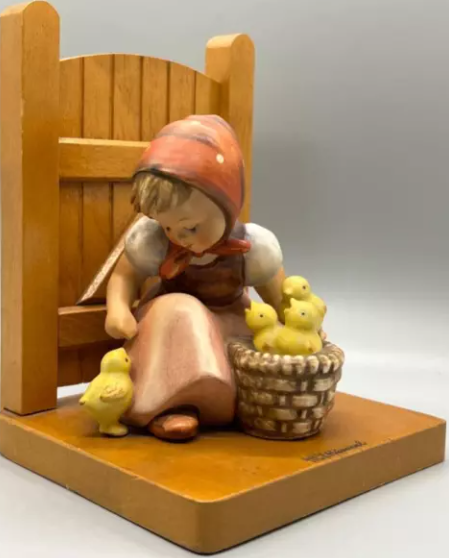
Hummel figurine of a pastoral scene

In September 2017, this company also declared bankruptcy. On 22 December 2017, it became public news that Bernd Foertsch, a businessman from Kulmbach, intended to acquire Hummel Manufaktur. The acquisition has meanwhile been completed. Bernd Foertsch now wants the company to undergo a process of restructuring. He will put the company's focus on direct sales and an extensive community concept to integrate the huge collectors’ community. The annual production of figurines will be reduced from 55,000 to 20,000. Moreover, no figurine smaller than ten centimeters or less than €100 will be manufactured.

== M. I. Hummel Club ==
In 1977, The Goebel Collector's Club was founded in the U.S. The club was to be an information service for the growing number of M. I. Hummel collectors. In 1989, the Club expanded internationally, and the name changed to the M. I. Hummel Club.

== Books about Hummel figurines ==
Books and price guides have been published about Hummel figurines. Some of these works supported the secondary market interest of collector speculators; The Official M. I. Hummel Price Guide: Figurines and Plates, 2nd Edition, by Heidi Ann Von Recklinghausen is a current price guide, published in 2013. Another guide, The No. 1 Price Guide to M. I. Hummel, written by Robert L. Miller, was last updated as a 10th Edition in 2006.

The Hummel Album was published in 1992 by Portfolio Press. A team of writers, designers and photographers worked with the figurine manufacturer to tell the M. I. Hummel story.

== Museums ==
Das Berta-Hummel-Museum im Hummelhaus opened in 1994 in the Hummel family home in Massing, Germany, the birthplace of the artist Berta Hummel, later known as Maria Innocentia. Berta Hummel's nephew Alfred Hummel and his daughter, Veronika direct the museum which houses the largest collection of M. I. Hummel figurines in Europe as well as the paintings and drawings of Berta Hummel completed before she joined the Convent.

Donald Stephens, longtime mayor of Rosemont, Illinois, United States, was a prolific collector of Hummel figurines. In 1984, Stephens donated his collection to the Village of Rosemont to be displayed in a museum. The Donald E. Stephens Museum of Hummels opened in Rosemont on March 13, 2011. The museum purports to be the largest collection of Hummel figurines in the world. In 2026, the museum was relocated to take up part of the space in the newly opened Rosemont History Museum.
