= Hohenfels Castle (Hohenfels) =

- Burg Hohenfels, Schloss Hohenfels, Neu-Hohenfels, Schule Schloss Salem- Unterstufe Hohenfels
- Hohenfels-Kalkofen
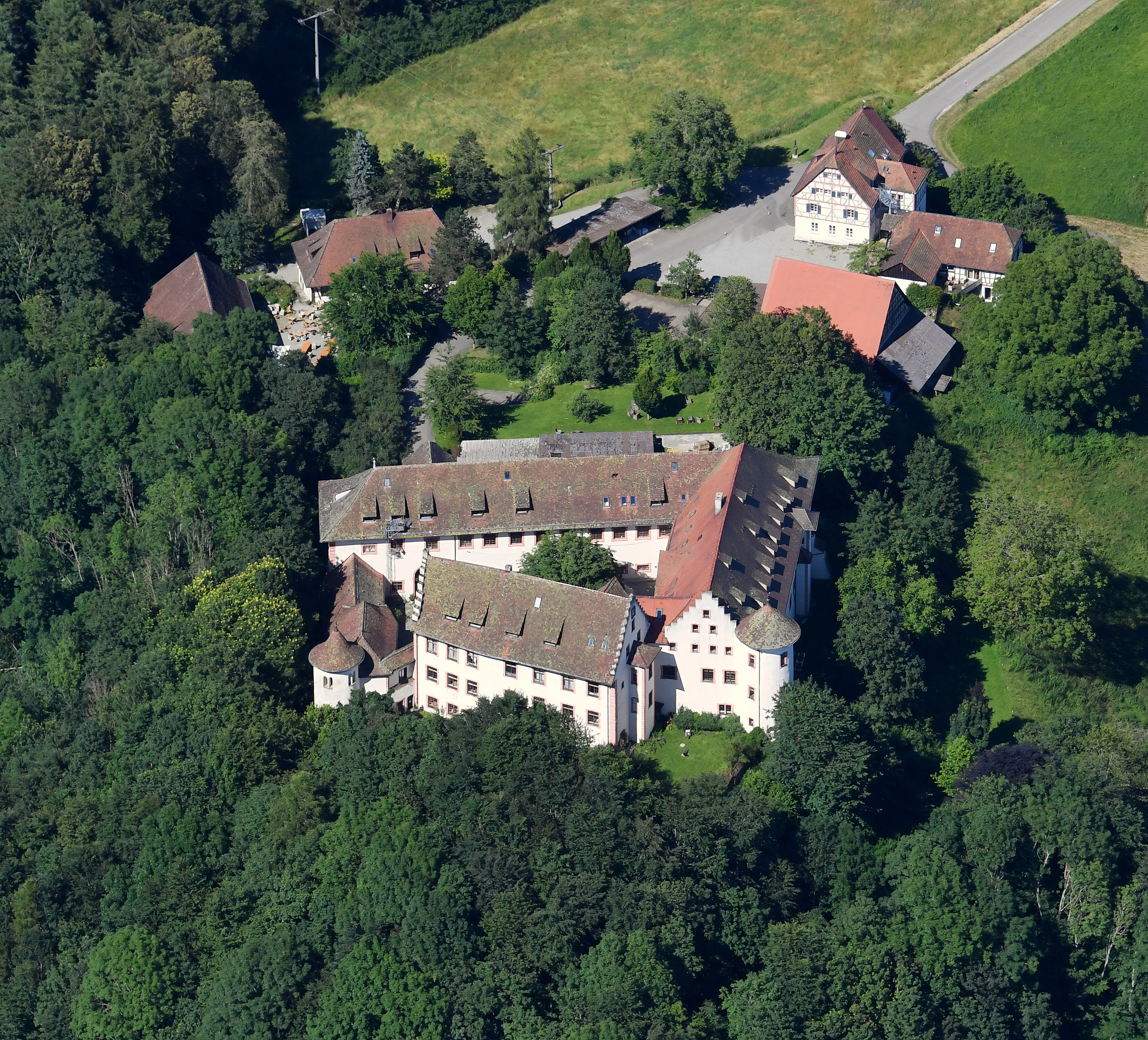
- Aerial view of Hohenfels Castle

Site information
- Type: hill castle, spur castle
- Code: DE-BW
- Condition: preserved or largely preserved

Location
- Coordinates: 47°51′51″N 9°06′40″E

Hohenfels Castle (German: Burg Hohenfels), also called Schloss Hohenfels or New Hohenfels (Neu-Hohenfels) is a mediaeval spur castle in which a boarding school was housed until July 2017. The castle stands within the parish of Kalkofen, over a kilometre south of the village itself, which is part of the municipality of Hohenfels in the county of Konstanz in Germany. The castle gave its name to the municipality of Hohenfels which was created in 1973.

== Location ==
The castle is located around eight kilometres east of Stockach and twelve kilometres north of Lake Constance, on the spur of a south-tilting kuppe of a forested hill ridge.

== History ==
Hohenfels Castle has more than 700 years of history. It was founded by the lords of Hohenfels and was the family seat of the Neu-Hohenfels, a branch of Alt-Hohenfels with its family seat at Hohenfels in Bonndorf in the county of Konstanz, who had settled here in the 12th century. Hohenfels Castle was first mentioned in 1292 as "Neuhohenfels".

The Neuhohenfels line died out in 1352, and the Barony of Neuhohenfels, including its castle, passed by marriage to the lords of Jungingen, who managed to largely reunite the two Hohenfels estates in the early 15th century through marriage. After flourishing for a short period, the family territory was divided again in 1441 into the Jungingen-Althohenfels and Jungingen-Neuhohenfels estates and fell into decay.

After the death in 1501 of the last male member of the Jungingen family, Ulrich of Jungingen, in 1506 his sister Anna sold the Barony of Neuhohenfels to the Teutonic Order. Since then the estate has been owned by the Landkomturei Altshausen of the Teutonic Order Bailiwick of Alsace and Burgundy. For exactly 300 years, from 1506 to 1806, the Teutonic Order dominated Altshausen influenced the Barony of Hohenfels. In 1553 and 1642 there were fires at the castle.

In 1806, the Teutonic Order estate of Hohenfels, which was managed by an Obervogtei (senior advocate's office), and which included Hohenfels Castle as well as the villages of Deutwang, Kalkofen, Liggersdorf, Mindersdorf and Selgetsweiler, together with the Teutonic Order estate of Achberg came under the sovereignty of the Principality of Hohenzollern-Sigmaringen and was incorporated into the Obervogtei of Hohenfels.

The castle passed through the hands of the princely House of Hohenzollern to the School of Schloss Salem. The school sold the castle in 2018. The new owner transformed the castle into a convention centre.

== Literature ==
- Christian H. Freitag: Hohenfelser Geschichten - erzählt nach Dokumenten der Zeit. In: Dr. Fredy Meyer (ed.): Römer Ritter Regenpfeifer. Streifzüge durch die Kulturlandschaft westlicher Bodensee, Konstanz, 1995, pp. 83–97
- Christian H. Freitag: Von 'Hohenvels nova' zur Schule Burg Hohenfels. In: Hohenzollerische Heimat, 2/2000, pp. 17–20 and 3/2000, pp. 42–44
- Christian H. Freitag: Des einen Leid, des andern Freud! - Die Umwidmung des Hohenfelser Burggefängnisses zu einem Hohenfels-Museum. In: Hegau Zeitschrift für Geschichte, Volkskunde und Naturgeschichte des Gebietes zwischen Rhein, Donau und Bodensee, 61/ 2004, pp. 179–184
- Walther Genzmer (ed.): Die Kunstdenkmäler Hohenzollerns. Band 2. Kreis Sigmaringen. W. Speemann, Stuttgart 1948.
- Otto Glaeser: Brief Walther's von Hohenfels an Konrad von Jungingen 1397. In: Hohenzollerische Jahreshefte. Band 5. 1938. pp. 360–361
- Otto Glaeser: Die Herrschaften Alt- und Neu-Hohenfels und ihre Besitzer im Mittelalter. In: Hohenzollerische Jahreshefte. Band 1. 1934. pp. 65–112
- Otto Glaeser: Die Herrschaften Alt- und Neu-Hohenfels und ihre Besitzer im Mittelalter. In: Hohenzollerische Jahreshefte. Band 2. 1935. pp. 67–112
- Otto Glaeser: Die Herrschaften Alt- und Neu-Hohenfels und ihre Besitzer im Mittelalter. In: Hohenzollerische Jahreshefte. Band 3. 1936. pp. 65–119
- Otto Glaeser: Die Herrschaften Alt- und Neu-Hohenfels und ihre Besitzer im Mittelalter. In: Hohenzollerische Jahreshefte. Band 4. 1937. pp. 1–58
- Eugen Gradmann: Kunsthistorischer Wanderführer. Württemberg und Hohenzollern. Chr. Belser AG. Stuttgart-Zürich, 1970. p. 489 ISBN 3-88199-137-9
- Max Miller (ed.): Handbuch der historischen Stätten Deutschlands - Bd. 6: Baden-Württemberg, Stuttgart, 1965
- Otto Seydel: Rituale - Feier - Begehung. Das Beispiel der Schule Burg Hohenfels. pp. 140–151. In: Michael Wermke (ed.): Rituale und Inszenierungen in Schule und Unterricht. LIT Verlag Berlin-Hamburg-Münster, 1997. ISBN 3825832791
