= Goldene Leslie =

Goldene Leslie is a literary prize for youth books in Germany.
