= Delyo =

Bulgarian rebel leader

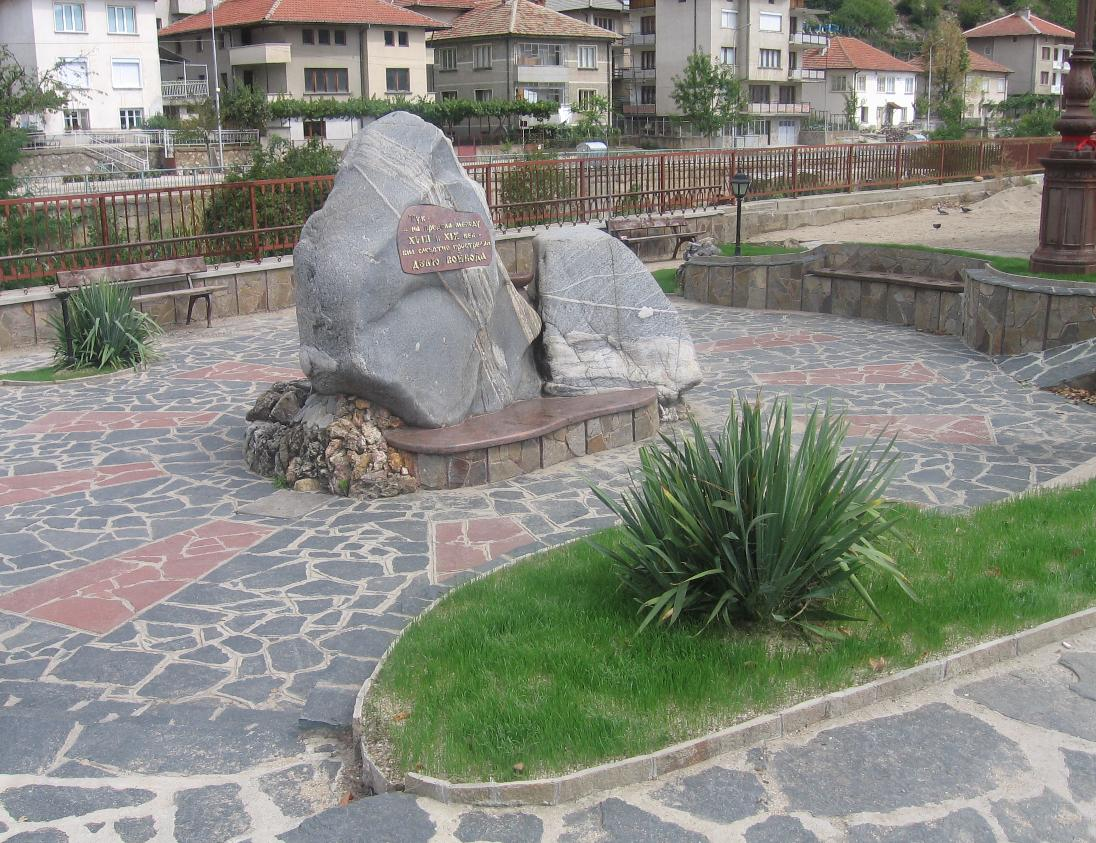
Delyo's monument in Zlatograd reportedly stands at the place of his death

Delyo (Bulgarian: Дельо, sometimes Делю, Delyu) was a Bulgarian rebel leader (hajduk voivode) who was active in the Rhodope Mountains in the late 17th and early 18th centuries.

Delyo was born in Belovidovo (today Zlatograd) in the Smolyan region in the 17th century. He headed an armed detachment of rebels in the central Rhodopes and acted against the Ottoman authorities' Islamization of the local Bulgarian population. In 1720, he led a group of united rebel detachments that attacked Raykovo (today a neighbourhood of Smolyan) in revenge for the murder of 200 locals who refused to convert from Christianity to Islam. Delyo was mentioned in Historical notebook, an 18th-century document of disputed authenticity.

Delyo is a popular character in Rhodopean folk songs and legends. He is presented as a protector of the local population and an opponent of the local Ottoman authorities. He is glorified as being unkillable by a standard sword or gun, so his enemies cast a silver bullet in order to murder him. According to the legends, Delyo was the son of a poor craftsman and was taught tailoring by his uncle in Yenice (Giannitsa), but upon getting to know Bulgarians from around Gümülcine (Komotini), he organized a rebel detachment to counter the Ottoman atrocities.

The most popular folk piece about Delyo is "Izlel e Delyo haydutin" ("Delyo the hajduk has gone out"), a song from the Central Rhodopes that has been recorded in various versions. The song is best known as performed by Bulgarian folk singer Valya Balkanska. It was launched into space in 1977 as part of the Voyager 1 and Voyager 2 probes' Golden Record which includes a multicultural selection of music.
