= Arda, Bulgaria =

Arda
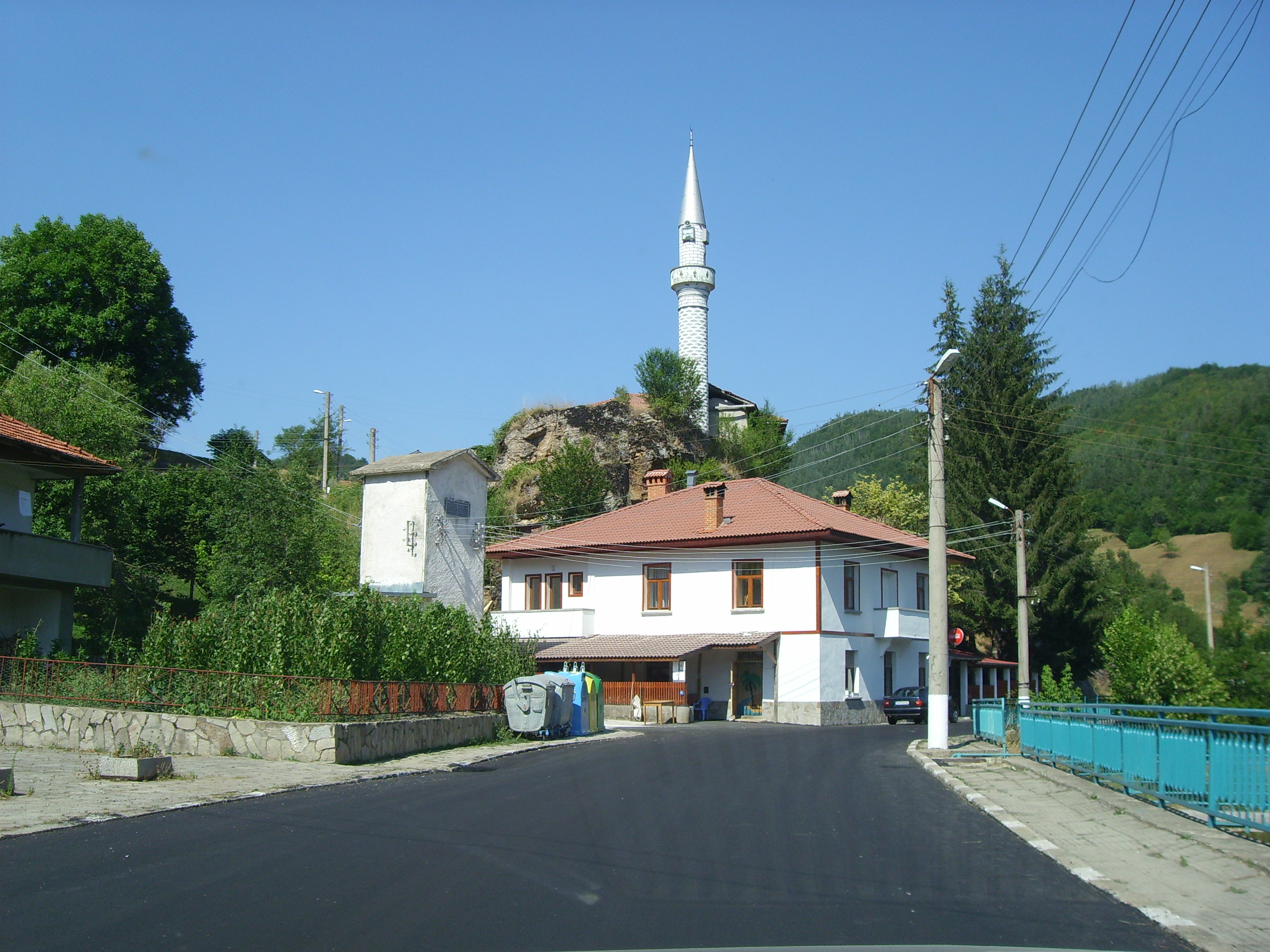
- Arda Mosque

- Location in Bulgaria
- Coordinates: 41°28′N 24°38′E
- Country: Bulgaria
- Province: Smolyan Province
- Municipality: Smolyan Municipality

Government
  - Mayor: Emil Bashev

Population (2007)
  - Total: 314
- Time zone: UTC+2 (EET)

Arda (Bulgarian: Арда) is a village in Smolyan Municipality, located in the Smolyan Province of southern Bulgaria. It is located 173.424 km from Sofia and the village covers an area of 17.928 km^{2}. As of 2007, the village had a population of 314 people.

The village is located 30 km south of Smolyan. The village is mentioned in records of the Ottoman Empire, indicating 13 soldiers in the army were from the village. A census in 1912-1913 indicated a population of 200.

Some of the inhabitants of the village are Pomaks and follow Islam as their main religion, others are Eastern Orthodox Bulgarians.

The Ilinden festival takes place in the village every summer. Near the village of Arda, in the neighbourhoods of Gudevitsa and Lagat (birthplace of folk singer Valya Balkanska) there are springs from one of the largest Bulgarian rivers, the Arda, from which the village takes its name. In this neighbourhood is also a church, built in 1882.

== Notable people ==
- Valya Balkanska (1942–), Bulgarian folk singer
- Vasil Angelov (1882–1953), Bulgarian revolutionary and military person
- Dicho Uzunov (1921–), Bulgarian military person
- Asen Vasilev (1909–1987), carver, folk artist
