= Bulgarians =

South Slavic ethnic group

българи bŭlgari

Total population
- c. 9 million

Regions with significant populations
- Bulgaria 5,118,494 (2021)
- Germany: 436,860 (2023)
- Ukraine: 204,574–500,000 (2001)
- Spain: 300,000 (2017)
- United States: 300,000 (2016)
- United Kingdom: 86,000 (2020–2021)
- Argentina: 70,000–80,000 (2020)
- Moldova (incl. Transnistria): 79,520 (2004)
- Brazil: 74,000 (2016)
- Greece: 72,893–300,000 (2015)
- Italy: 58,620–120,000 (2016)
- Netherlands: 50,305 (2022)
- Canada: 30,485–70,000 (2011)
- Belgium: 46,876 (2020)
- France: 40,000–80,000
- Austria: 25,686 (2017)
- Russia (2010 area): 24,038–330,000 (2010)
- Cyprus (excl. TRNC): 19,197 (2011)
- Denmark: 13,877 (2025)
- Serbia: 12,918 (2022)
- Czech Republic: 12,250 (2016)
- Sweden: 6,257–9,105 (2016)
- Norway: 6,752–8,180 (2017)
- Switzerland: 8,588 (2017)
- Albania: 7,057 (2023)
- Portugal: 7,019–12,000 (2016)
- Romania: 5,975 (2021)
- Australia: 5,436 (2011)
- Kazakhstan: 5,788 (2023)
- South Africa: 4,224–20,000 (2015)
- Hungary: 4,022 (2016)
- North Macedonia: 3,504 (2021)
- Finland: 2,840 (2018)
- Poland: 2,373 (2021)
- Slovakia: 1,552 (2021)
- Slovenia: 1,500 (2011)

Languages
- Bulgarian

Religion
- Predominantly Orthodox Christianity (Bulgarian Orthodox Church) minority Islam, Catholicism, Protestantism, Irreligion

Related ethnic groups
- Other South Slavs, especially Macedonians, Slavic speakers of Greek Macedonia and Torlak speakers in Serbia.
- a: The 2011 census figure was 5,664,624. The question on ethnicity was voluntary and 10% of the population did not declare any ethnicity, thus the figure is considered an underestimation. Ethnic Bulgarians are estimated at around 6 million, 85% of the population. b: Estimates of the number of Pomaks whom most scholars categorize as Bulgarians c: According to the 2002 census there were 1,417 Bulgarians in North Macedonia. Between 2003 and 2017, according to the data provided by Bulgarian authorities some 87,483-200,000 permanent residents of North Macedonia declared Bulgarian origin in their applications for Bulgarian citizenship, of which 67,355 requests were granted. A minor part of them are among the total of 2,934 North Macedonia-born residents, who are residing in Bulgaria by 2016. d: by citizenship excluding dual citizens e: by single ethnic group per person f: by foreign-born h: by heritage n: by legal nationality m: by nationality, naturalisation and descendant background

Bulgarians (Bulgarian: българи, romanized: bŭlgari, IPA: [ˈbɤɫɡɐri]) are a South Slavic ethnic group and nation native to Bulgaria and its neighbouring regions. They share a common culture, ancestry, history, and speak the Bulgarian language. Bulgarians form the majority of the population in Bulgaria and exist as historical communities in North Macedonia, Ukraine, Moldova, Serbia, Albania, Romania, Hungary and Greece.

== Etymology ==
Bulgarians derive their ethnonym from the Bulgars. Their name is not completely understood and difficult to trace back earlier than the 4th century CE, but it is possibly derived from the Proto-Turkic word *bulģha ("to mix", "shake", "stir") and its derivative *bulgak ("revolt", "disorder"). Alternative etymologies include derivation from a compound of Proto-Turkic (Oghuric) *bel ("five") and *gur ("arrow" in the sense of "tribe"), a proposed division within the Utigurs or Onogurs ("ten tribes").

== Ethnogenesis ==
Modern-day Bulgarians descend from peoples of vastly different origins and numbers, and are thus the result of a melting pot effect. The main ethnic elements which blended to produce the modern Bulgarian ethnicity are:

- Thracians – a native ancient Balkan Indo-European people who left a cultural and genetic legacy. Approximately 40-45% of Bulgarian autosomal genetic legacy is of Paleo-Balkan and Mediterranean origin and can be attributed to the indigenous Balkan and ancient Roman populations;
- Early Slavs – an Indo-European group of tribes that migrated from Eastern Europe into the Balkans in the 6th–7th century CE and imposed their language and culture on the local Thracian, Roman and Greek communities. Approximately 51-56% of Bulgarian autosomal make-up comes from a northeastern European population that admixed with the native population in the period between 400 and 1000 CE as determined by the latest study on the genome of Bulgarians;
- Bulgars – a semi-nomadic Turkic tribal federation, possibly from Central Asia, which settled in the northeast of the Balkans in the 7th century CE, federated with the local Slavic and Slavicized population, organised early-medieval Bulgarian statehood and bequeathed their ethnonym to the modern Bulgarian ethnicity, while eventually assimilating into the Slavic population. East Eurasian ancestry calculated on the base of autosomal, paternal and maternal DNA, converge on about 1% of Bulgarian genetic pool. This contribution is attributed to the Bulgars, Avars, Cumans and others Turkic tribes, which settled on the Balkans during the Middle ages, with admixture peaking in the 9th century CE;

The indigenous Thracians left a cultural and genetic legacy. Other pre-Slavic Indo-European peoples, including Dacians (if distinct from Thracians), Celts, Goths, Romans, ancient Greeks, Sarmatians, Paeonians and Illyrians also settled in what later became the Bulgarian lands. The Thracian language was still spoken in the 6th century, probably becoming extinct afterwards, In a later period the Bulgarians replaced long-established Greek/Latin toponyms with Thracian ones, which might suggest that Thracian had not been completely obliterated then.

Some pre-Slavic linguistic and cultural traces might have been preserved among modern Bulgarians (and Macedonians). Scythia Minor and Moesia Inferior appear to have been Romanized, though the region became a focus of barbarian re-settlements (various Goths and Huns) during the 4th and early 5th centuries AD, before a further "Romanization" episode during the early 6th century. According to archeological evidence from the late periods of Roman rule, the Romans did not decrease the number of Thracians significantly in major cities. By the 4th century the major city of Serdica had predominantly Thracian populace based on epigraphic evidence, which shows prevailing Latino-Thracian given names, but thereafter the names were completely replaced by Christian ones.

The early Slavs emerged from their original homeland in the early 6th century, and spread to most of the eastern Central Europe, Eastern Europe and the Balkans, thus forming three main branches: the West Slavs in eastern Central Europe, the East Slavs in Eastern Europe, and the South Slavs in Southeastern Europe (Balkans). The latter gradually inflicted total linguistic replacement of Thracian, if the Thracians had not already been Romanized or Hellenized. Most scholars accept that they began large-scale settling of the Balkans in the 580s based on the statement of the 6th century historian Menander speaking of 100,000 Slavs in Thrace and consecutive attacks of Greece in 582. They continued coming to the Balkans in many waves, but also leaving, most notably Justinian II (685–695) settled as many as 30,000 Slavs from Thrace in Asia Minor. The Byzantines grouped the numerous Slavic tribes into two groups: the Sclaveni and Antes. Some Bulgarian scholars suggest that the Antes became one of the ancestors of the modern Bulgarians.

The Bulgars are first mentioned in the 4th century in the vicinity of the North Caucasian steppe. Scholars often suggest that the ultimate origins of the Bulgar is Turkic and can be traced to the Central Asian nomadic confederations, specifically as part of loosely related Oghuric tribes which spanned from the Pontic steppe to central Asia. However, any direct connection between the Bulgars and postulated Asian counterparts rest on little more than speculative and "contorted etymologies". Some Bulgarian historians question the identification of the Bulgars as a Turkic tribe and suggest an Iranian origin. Other Bulgarian scholars actively oppose the "Iranian hypothesis". According to Raymond Detrez, the Iranian theory is rooted in the periods of anti-Turkish sentiment in Bulgaria and is ideologically motivated. Since 1989, anti-Turkish rhetoric is now reflected in the theories that challenge the thesis of the Bulgars' Turkic origin. Alongside the Iranian or Aryan theory, there appeared arguments favoring an autochthonous origin.

In the 670s, some Bulgar tribes, the Danube Bulgars led by Asparuh and the Bulgars, led by Kuber, crossed the Danube river and settled in the Balkans with a single migration wave, the former of which Michael the Syrian described as numbering 10,000. The Bulgars are often not thought to have been numerous, becoming a ruling elite in the areas they controlled. However, according to Steven Runciman a tribe that was able to defeat an Emperor-lead Byzantine army, must have been of considerable dimensions. Asparuh's Bulgars made a tribal union with the Severians and the "Seven clans", who were re-settled to protect the flanks of the Bulgar settlements in Scythia Minor, as the capital Pliska was built on the site of a former Slavic settlement.

During the Early Byzantine Era, the Roman provincials in Scythia Minor and Moesia Secunda were already engaged in economic and social exchange with the 'barbarians' north of the Danube. This might have facilitated their eventual Slavonization, though the majority of the population appears to have been withdrawn to the hinterland of Constantinople or Asia Minor prior to any permanent Slavic and Bulgar settlement south of the Danube. The major port towns in Pontic Bulgaria remained Byzantine Greek in their outlook. The large scale population transfers and territorial expansions during the 8th and 9th century, additionally increased the number of the Slavs and Byzantine Christians within the state, making the Bulgars quite obviously a minority. The establishment of a new state molded the various Slav, Bulgar and earlier or later populations into the "Bulgarian people" of the First Bulgarian Empire speaking a South Slavic language. In different periods to the ethnogenesis of the local population contributed also different Indo-European and Turkic people, who settled or lived on the Balkans. The Bulgarians are part of the South Slavs.

=== Bulgarian ethnogenetic conception ===
The controversial issue of the ethnogenesis of Bulgarians is a popular subject in the works of nationalist scientists. Fierce debates started in the 19th century, and suggested proportions of presumed Thracian, Bulgar, and Slavic ancestry have depended on the geopolitical situation of the country and on ideological and political predilections. These supposed proportions have been changed several times during the 20th century, emphasizing usually the Slavic part of Bulgarian ancestry, related to the traditionally strong Russophilia in the country. However, during the 1970s Thracology was especially supported by the Communist government, as an attempt to underline the indigenous influence in the Bulgarian ethnogenesis. After the fall of Communism, the spiritualized image of the Thracians began to fade. Following the cooling of relations with Russia and the country's EU accession, the view of significant Bulgar genetic impact in nationalist circles has lately downplayed the country's Slavic ancestry. From a limited group of Turkic equestrian nomads, the Danubian Bulgars were reinterpreted by them as a numerous Aryan people, with a unique culture.

== Genetic origins ==
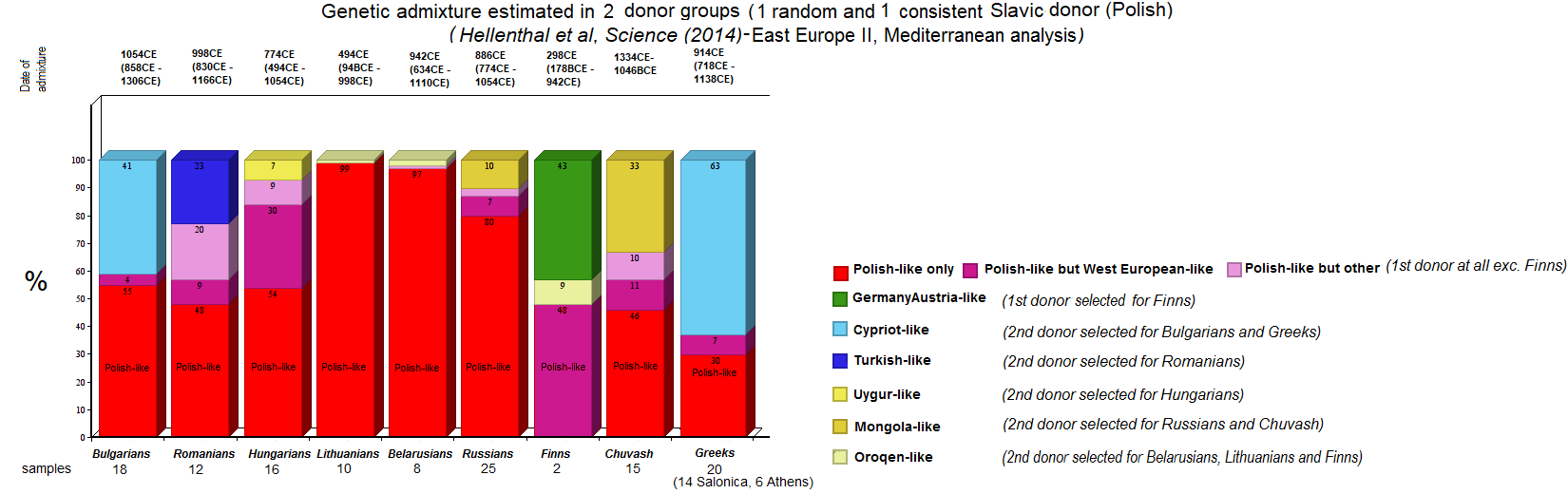
Historical contribution of donor source groups in European peoples according to Hellenthal et al., (2014). Polish is selected to represent Slavic-speaking donor groups from the Middle Ages that are estimated to make up 97% of the ancestry in Belarusians, 80% in Russians, 55% in Bulgarians, 54% in Hungarians, 48% in Romanians, 46% in Chuvash and 30% in Greeks.

According to a triple analysis – autosomal, mitochondrial and paternal — of available data from large-scale studies on Balto-Slavs and their proximal populations, the whole genome SNP data situates Bulgarians in a cluster with Romanians, Macedonians and Gagauzes, and they are at similar proximity to Serbs and Montenegrins.

Bulgarians, like most Europeans, largely descend from three distinct lineages: Mesolithic hunter-gatherers, descended from populations associated with the Paleolithic Epigravettian culture; Neolithic Early European Farmers who migrated from Anatolia during the Neolithic Revolution 9,000 years ago; and Yamnaya Steppe herders who expanded into Europe from the Pontic steppe in the context of Indo-European migrations 5,000 years ago.

== History ==
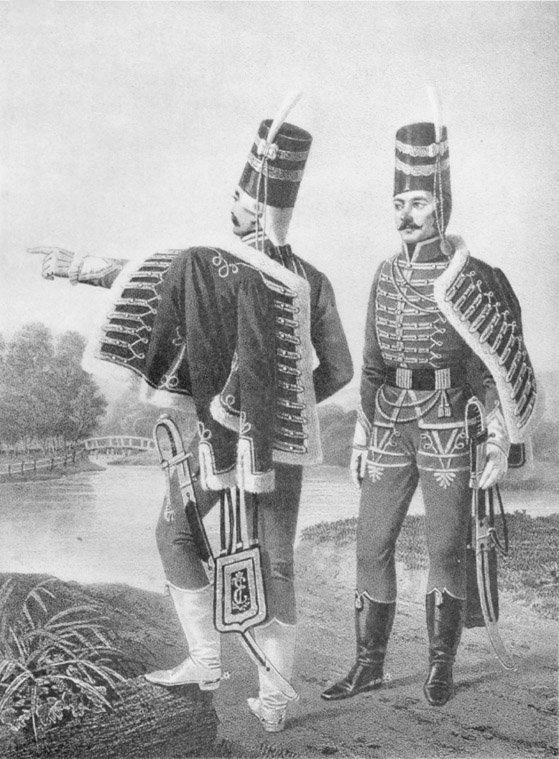
Officers from Bulgarian hussar regiment in Russia (1776–1783)

Although modern Bulgaria is a young nation state, Bulgaria was founded in 681 as a Slav-Bulgar state. After the adoption of Orthodox Christianity in 864 it became one of the cultural centres of Slavic Europe. Its leading cultural position was consolidated with the invention of the Cyrillic script in its capital Preslav at the eve of the 10th century. The development of Old Church Slavonic literacy in the country during the 10th century, had the effect of preventing the assimilation of the South Slavs into neighbouring cultures. Also, it stimulated the development of a Bulgarian national identity, that was far from modern nationalism but it helped Bulgaria to survive as a distinct entity through the centuries. A symbiosis was carried out between the numerically weak Bulgars and the numerous Slavic tribes in that broad area from the Danube to the north, to the Aegean Sea to the south, and from the Adriatic Sea to the west, to the Black Sea to the east, who accepted the common demonym "Bulgarians".

In 1018, Bulgaria lost its independence and remained a Byzantine subject until 1185, when the Second Bulgarian Empire was created. Nevertheless, at the end of the 14th century, the Ottomans conquered the whole of Bulgaria. Under the Ottoman system, Christians were considered an inferior class of people. Thus, Bulgarians, like other Christians, were subjected to heavy taxes and a small portion of the Bulgarian populace experienced partial or complete Islamisation. Orthodox Christians were included in a specific ethno-religious community called Rum Millet. To the common people, belonging to this Orthodox commonwealth became more important than their ethnic origins. This community became both, basic form of social organization and source of identity for all the ethnic groups inside it. In this way, ethnonyms were rarely used and between the 15th and 19th centuries, most of the local people gradually began to identify themselves simply as Christians. However, the public-spirited clergy in some isolated monasteries still kept the distinct Bulgarian identity alive, and this helped it to survive predominantly in rural, remote areas. Despite the process of ethno-religious fusion among the Orthodox Christians, strong nationalist sentiments persisted into the Catholic community in the northwestern part of the country. At that time, a process of partial Hellenization occurred among the intelligentsia and the urban population, as a result of the higher status of the Greek culture and the Greek Orthodox Church among the Balkan Christians. During the second half of the 18th century, the Enlightenment in Western Europe provided influence for the initiation of the National awakening of Bulgaria in 1762.

Some Bulgarians supported the Russian Army when they crossed the Danube in the middle of the 18th century. Russia worked to convince them to settle in areas recently conquered by it, especially in Bessarabia. As a consequence, many Bulgarian refugees settled there, and later they formed two military regiments, as part of the Russian military colonization of the area in 1759–1763.

=== Bulgarian national movement ===
During the Russo-Turkish Wars of 1806–1812 and 1828–1829 Bulgarian emigrants formed the Bulgarian Countrymen's Army and joined the Russian Army, hoping Russia would bring Bulgarian liberation, but its imperial interests were focused then on Greece and Wallachia. The rise of nationalism under the Ottoman Empire led to a struggle for cultural and religious autonomy of the Bulgarian people. The Bulgarians wanted to have their own schools and liturgy in Bulgarian, and they needed an independent ecclesiastical organisation. Discontent with the supremacy of the Greek Orthodox clergy, the struggle started to flare up in several Bulgarian dioceses in the 1820s.

It was not until the 1850s when the Bulgarians initiated a purposeful struggle against the Patriarchate of Constantinople. The struggle between the Bulgarians and the Greek Phanariotes intensified throughout the 1860s. In 1861 the Vatican and the Ottoman government recognized a separate Bulgarian Uniat Church. As the Greek clerics were ousted from most Bulgarian bishoprics at the end of the decade, significant areas had been seceded from the Patriarchate's control. This movement restored the distinct Bulgarian national consciousness among the common people and led to the recognition of the Bulgarian millet in 1870 by the Ottomans. As result, two armed struggle movements started to develop as late as the beginning of the 1870s: the Internal Revolutionary Organisation and the Bulgarian Revolutionary Central Committee. Their armed struggle reached its peak with the April Uprising which broke out in 1876. It resulted in the Russo-Turkish War (1877–1878), and led to the foundation of the third Bulgarian state after the Treaty of San Stefano. The issue of Bulgarian nationalism gained greater significance, following the Congress of Berlin which took back the Macedonia and Adrianople regions, returning them under the control of the Ottoman Empire. Also an autonomous Ottoman province, called Eastern Rumelia was created in Northern Thrace. As a consequence, the Bulgarian national movement proclaimed as its aim the inclusion of most of Macedonia, Thrace and Moesia under Greater Bulgaria.

Eastern Rumelia was annexed to Bulgaria in 1885 through bloodless revolution. During the early 1890s, two pro-Bulgarian revolutionary organizations were founded: the Internal Macedonian-Adrianople Revolutionary Organization and the Supreme Macedonian-Adrianople Committee. In 1903 they participated in the unsuccessful Ilinden-Preobrazhenie Uprising against the Ottomans in Macedonia and the Adrianople Vilayet. Macedonian Slavs were identified then predominantly as Bulgarians, and significant Bulgarophile sentiments endured up among them until the end of the Second World War. However, most of the Macedonian Slavs did not develop a clear national identity at all, any expression of national identity among the majority was purely superficial and was imposed by the nationalist educational and religious propaganda or by terrorism.

In the early 20th century, the control over Macedonia became a key point of contention between Bulgaria, Greece, and Serbia, who fought the First Balkan War of (1912–1913) and the Second Balkan War of (1913). The area was further fought over during the World War I (1915–1918) and the World War II (1941–44).

== Demographics ==
Map of the Bulgarian diaspora in the world (includes people with Bulgarian ancestry or citizenship). Bulgaria + 100,000 + 10,000 + 1,000

Most Bulgarians live in Bulgaria, where they number around 6 million, constituting 85% of the population. Bulgarian minorities exist in Serbia, Romania (Banat Bulgarians), Hungary, Albania, as well as in Ukraine and Moldova (see Bessarabian Bulgarians). Many Bulgarians also live in the diaspora, which is formed by representatives and descendants of the old (before 1989) and new (after 1989) emigration. The old emigration was made up of some 2,470,000 economic and several tens of thousands of political emigrants, and was directed for the most part to the U.S., Canada, Argentina, Brazil and Germany. The new emigration is estimated at some 970,000 people and can be divided into two major subcategories: permanent emigration at the beginning of the 1990s, directed mostly to the U.S., Canada, Austria, and Germany and labour emigration at the end of the 1990s, directed for the most part to Greece, Italy, the UK and Spain. Migrations to the West have been quite steady even in the late 1990s and early 21st century, as people continue moving to countries like the US, Canada and Australia. Most Bulgarians living in Canada can be found in Toronto, Ontario, and the provinces with the most Bulgarians in Canada are Ontario and Quebec. According to the 2001 census there were 1,124,240 Bulgarian citizens in the city of Sofia, 302,858 in Plovdiv, 300,000 in Varna and about 200,000 in Burgas. The total number of Bulgarians stood at over 9 million. About 85% of Bulgaria's population identified themselves as ethnic Bulgarians in 2021 Bulgarian census, the rest being mostly Turks (8%) and Roma (4%).

== Associated ethnic groups ==
Bulgarians are considered most closely related to the neighbouring Macedonians. The ethnic Macedonians were considered Bulgarians by most ethnographers until the early 20th century and beyond with a big portion of them evidently self-identifying as such. The Slavic-speakers of Greek Macedonia and most among the Torlaks in Serbia have also had a history of identifying as Bulgarians and many were members of the Bulgarian Exarchate, which included most of the territory regarded as Torlak. The greater part of these people were also considered Bulgarians by most ethnographers until the early 20th century and beyond.

== Culture ==
=== Language ===
Bulgarians speak a South Slavic language which is mutually intelligible with Macedonian and to a lesser degree with Serbo-Croatian, especially the eastern dialects. The lexical similarities between Bulgarian and Macedonian are 86%, between Bulgarian and other Slavic languages between 71% and 80%, but with the Baltic languages they are 40–46%, while with English are about 20%. Less than a dozen Bulgarian words are derived from Turkic Bulgar.

Bulgarian demonstrates some linguistic developments that set it apart from other Slavic languages shared with Romanian, Albanian and Greek (see Balkan language area). Bulgarian was influenced lexically by medieval and modern Greek, and Turkish. Medieval Bulgarian influenced the other South Slavic languages and Romanian. With Bulgarian and Russian there was a mutual influence in both directions. Both languages were a lingua franca of each other during the Middle Ages. Recently, Bulgarian has borrowed many words from German, French and English.

The Bulgarian language is spoken by the majority of the Bulgarian diaspora, but less so by the descendants of earlier emigrants to the U.S., Canada, Argentina and Brazil.

Bulgarian linguists consider the officialized Macedonian language (since 1944) to be a local codified variation of Bulgarian, just as most ethnographers and linguists until the early 20th century considered the local Slavic speech in the Macedonian region as Bulgarian dialects. The president of Bulgaria, Zhelyu Zhelev, declined to recognize Macedonian as a separate language when North Macedonia became a new independent state. The Bulgarian language is written in the Cyrillic script.

==== Cyrillic alphabet ====
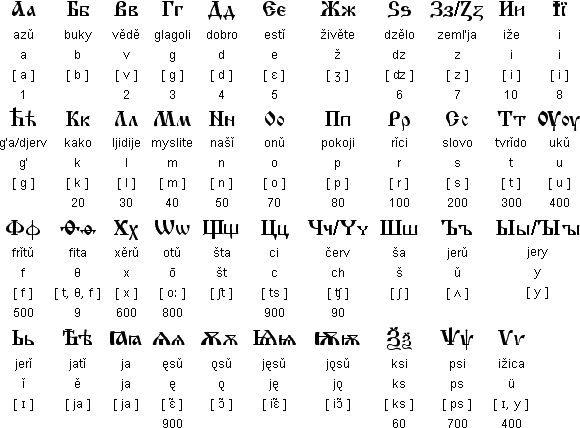
Cyrillic alphabet of the medieval Old Bulgarian language

In the first half of the 10th century, the Cyrillic script was devised in the Preslav Literary School, Bulgaria, based on the Glagolitic, the Greek and Latin alphabets. Modern versions of the alphabet are now used to write five more Slavic languages such as Belarusian, Macedonian, Russian, Serbian and Ukrainian as well as Mongolian and some other 60 languages spoken in the former Soviet Union. Medieval Bulgaria was the most important cultural centre of the Slavic peoples at the end of the 9th and throughout the 10th century. The two literary schools of Preslav and Ohrid developed a rich literary and cultural activity with authors of the rank of Constantine of Preslav, John Exarch, Chernorizets Hrabar, Clement and Naum of Ohrid. Bulgaria exerted similar influence on its neighbouring countries in the mid- to late 14th century, at the time of the Tarnovo Literary School, with the work of Patriarch Evtimiy, Gregory Tsamblak, Constantine of Kostenets (Konstantin Kostenechki). Bulgarian cultural influence was especially strong in Wallachia and Moldova where the Cyrillic script was used until 1860, while Church Slavonic was the official language of the princely chancellery and of the church until the end of the 17th century.

==== Name system ====
There are several different layers of Bulgarian names. The vast majority of them have either Christian (names like Lazar, Ivan, Anna, Maria, Ekaterina) or Slavic origin (Vladimir, Svetoslav, Velislava). After the Liberation in 1878, the names of historical Bulgar rulers like Asparuh, Krum, Kubrat and Tervel were resurrected. The Bulgar name Boris has spread from Bulgaria to a number of countries in the world.

Most Bulgarian male surnames have an -ov surname suffix (Cyrillic: -ов), a tradition used mostly by Eastern Slavic nations such as Russia, Ukraine and Belarus. This is sometimes transcribed as -off or -of (John Atanasov—John Atanasoff), but more often as -ov (e.g. Boyko Borisov). The -ov suffix is the Slavic gender-agreeing suffix, thus Ivanov (Bulgarian: Иванов) literally means "Ivan's". Bulgarian middle names are patronymic and use the gender-agreeing suffix as well, thus the middle name of Nikola's son becomes Nikolov, and the middle name of Ivan's daughter becomes Ivanova. Since names in Bulgarian are gender-based, Bulgarian women have the -ova surname suffix (Cyrillic: -ова), for example, Maria Ivanova. The plural form of Bulgarian names ends in -ovi (Cyrillic: -ови), for example the Ivanovi family (Иванови).

Other common Bulgarian male surnames have the -ev surname suffix (Cyrillic: -ев), for example Stoev, Ganchev, Peev, and so on. The female surname in this case would have the -eva surname suffix (Cyrillic: -ева), for example: Galina Stoeva. The last name of the entire family then would have the plural form of -evi (Cyrillic: -еви), for example: the Stoevi family (Стоеви).

Another typical Bulgarian surname suffix, though less common, is -ski. This surname ending also gets an –a when the bearer of the name is female (Smirnenski becomes Smirnenska). The plural form of the surname suffix -ski is still -ski, e.g. the Smirnenski family (Смирненски).

The ending –in (female -ina) also appears rarely. It used to be given to the child of an unmarried woman (for example the son of Kuna will get the surname Kunin and the son of Gana – Ganin). The surname suffix -ich can be found only occasionally, primarily among the Roman Catholic Bulgarians. The surname ending –ich does not get an additional –a if the bearer of the name is female.

=== Religion ===
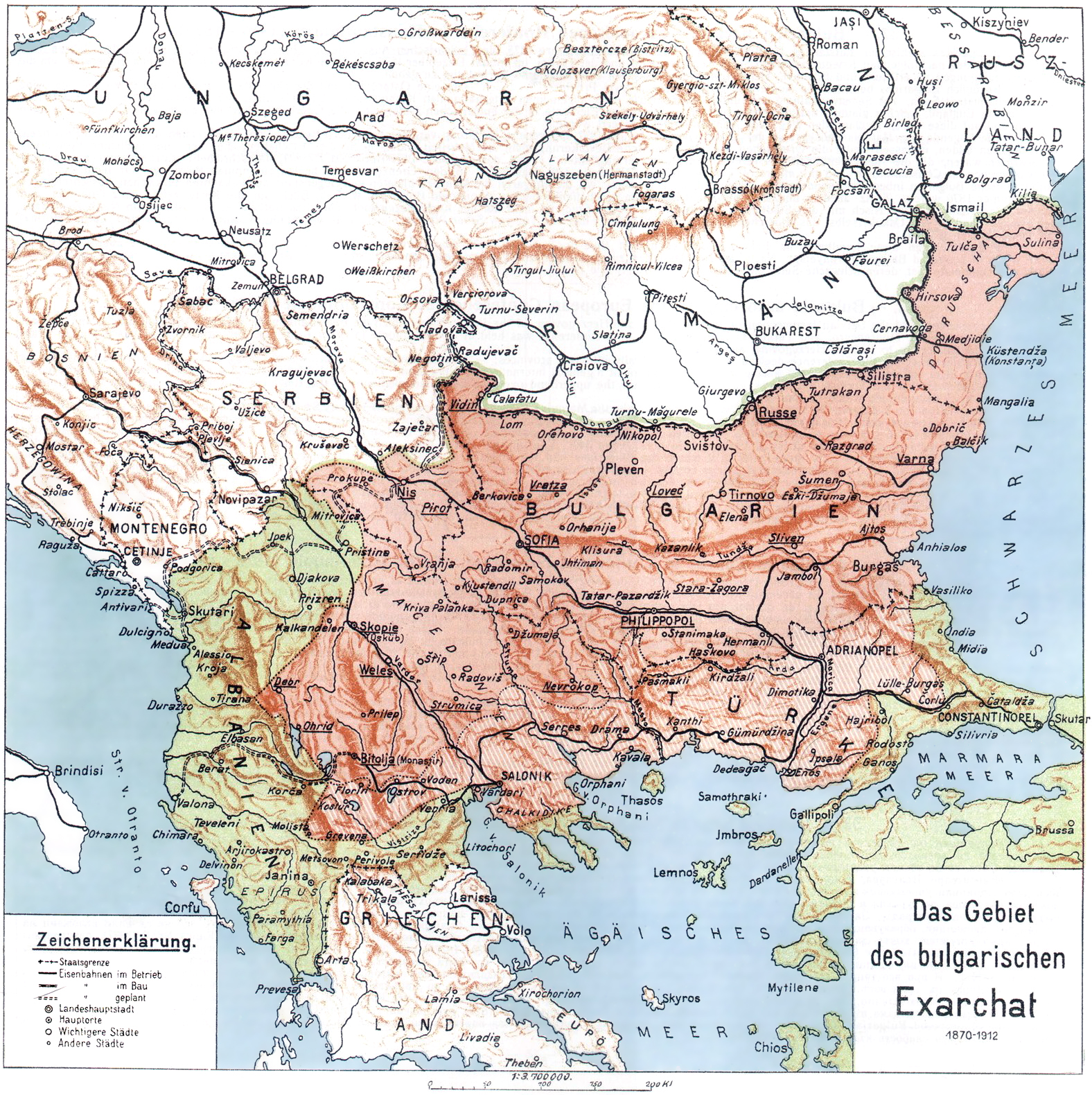
Map of the Bulgarian Exarchate (1870–1913). The Ottomans required a threshold of two thirds of positive votes of the Orthodox population to include a region into this jurisdiction.

Most Bulgarians are at least nominally members of the Bulgarian Orthodox Church founded in 870 AD (autocephalous since 927 AD). The Bulgarian Orthodox Church is the independent national church of Bulgaria like the other national branches of the Eastern Orthodox communion and is considered a dominating element of Bulgarian national consciousness. The church was abolished once, during the period of Ottoman rule (1396—1878), in 1873 it was revived as Bulgarian Exarchate and soon after raised again to Bulgarian Patriarchate. In 2021, the Orthodox Church at least nominally had a total of 4,219,270 members in Bulgaria (71.5% of the population), down from 6,552,000 (83%) at the 2001 census. 3,980,131 of these pointed out the Bulgarian ethnic group (79% of the total Bulgarian ethnic group). The Orthodox Bulgarian minorities in Romania, Serbia, Greece, Albania, Ukraine and Moldova nowadays hold allegiance to the respective national Orthodox churches.

Despite the position of the Bulgarian Orthodox Church as a unifying symbol for all Bulgarians, small groups of Bulgarians have converted to other faiths through the course of time. During Ottoman rule, a substantial number of Bulgarians converted to Islam, forming the community of the Pomaks or Muslim Bulgarians. In the 16th and the 17th centuries Roman Catholic missionaries converted a small number of Bulgarian Paulicians in the districts of Plovdiv and Svishtov to Roman Catholicism. Nowadays there are some 40,000 Roman Catholic Bulgarians in Bulgaria, additional 10,000 in the Banat in Romania and up to 100,000 people of Bulgarian ancestry in South America. The Roman Catholic Bulgarians of the Banat are also descendants of Paulicians who fled there at the end of the 17th century after an unsuccessful uprising against the Ottomans. Protestantism was introduced in Bulgaria by missionaries from the United States in 1857. Missionary work continued throughout the second half of the 19th and the first half of the 20th century. Nowadays there are some 25,000 Protestant Bulgarians in Bulgaria.

=== Art and science ===
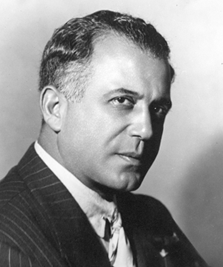
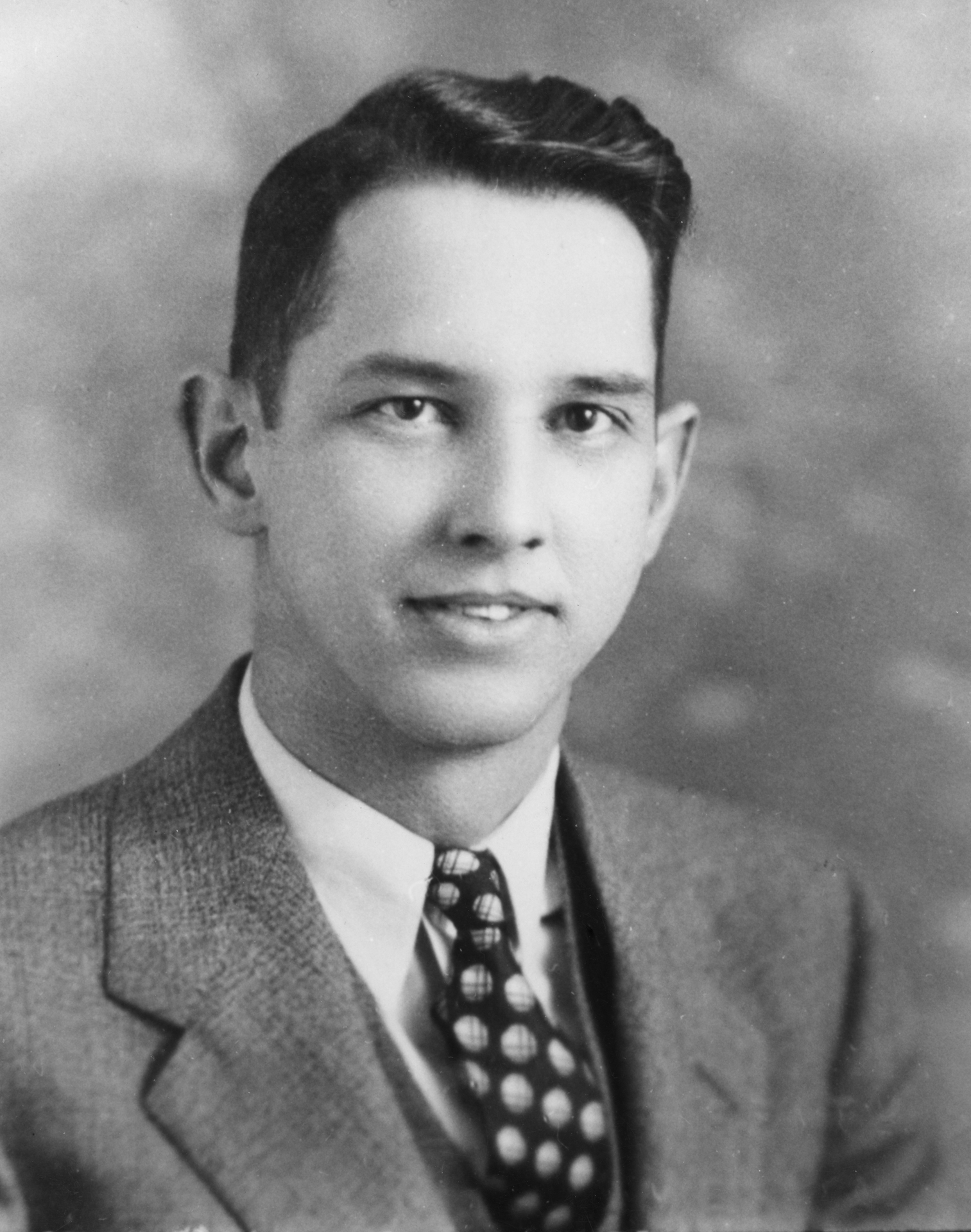
Assen Jordanoff (left), Bulgarian American inventor considered by prominent aviation specialists the main contributor to the American knowledge of aviation, likewise the Boeing, airbag and tape recorder.
John Vincent Atanasoff (right), Bulgarian American inventor of the Atanasoff-Berry computer, legally the inventor of the electronic digital computer in the U.S. and considered the "father of the computer".

Boris Christoff, Nicolai Ghiaurov, Raina Kabaivanska and Ghena Dimitrova made a precious contribution to opera singing with Ghiaurov and Christoff being two of the greatest bassos in the post-war period. Similarly, Anna-Maria Ravnopolska-Dean is one of the best-known harpists today. Bulgarians have made valuable contributions to world culture in modern times as well. Julia Kristeva and Tzvetan Todorov were among the most influential European philosophers in the second half of the 20th century. The artist Christo is among the most famous representatives of environmental art, with projects such as the Wrapped Reichstag.

Bulgarians in the diaspora have also been active. American scientists and inventors of Bulgarian descent include John Atanasoff, Peter Petroff, and Assen Jordanoff. Bulgarian-American Stephane Groueff wrote the celebrated book Manhattan Project, about the making of the first atomic bomb and also penned Crown of Thorns, a biography of Tsar Boris III of Bulgaria.

=== Cuisine ===
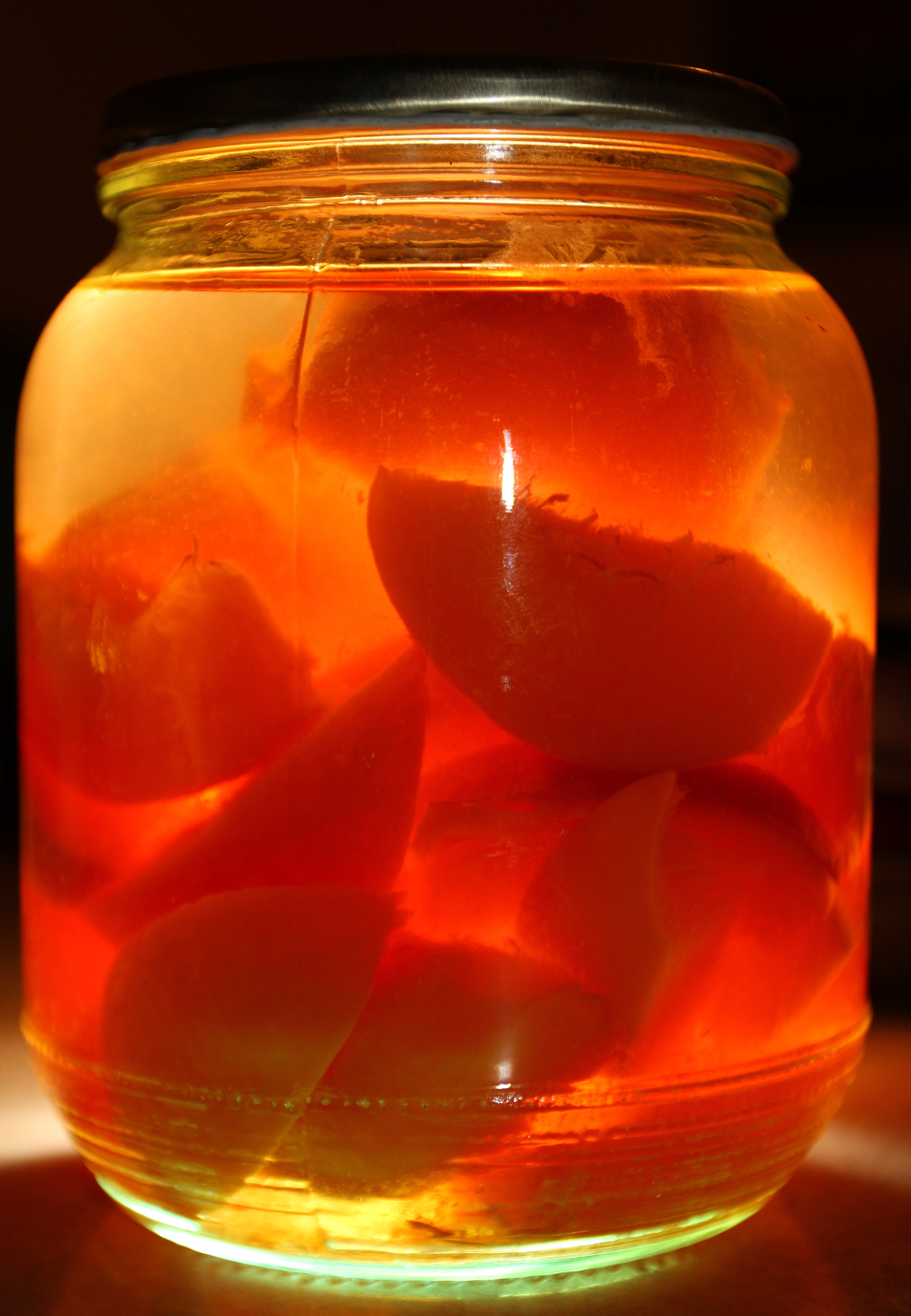
Bulgarian peach kompot – non alcoholic clear juice obtained by cooking fruit

Famous for its rich salads required at every meal, Bulgarian cuisine is also noted for the diversity and quality of dairy products and the variety of local wines and alcoholic beverages such as rakia, mastika and menta. Bulgarian cuisine features also a variety of hot and cold soups, an example of a cold soup being tarator. There are many different Bulgarian pastries as well such as banitsa.

Most Bulgarian dishes are oven baked, steamed, or in the form of stew. Deep-frying is not very typical, but grilling—especially different kinds of meats—is very common. Pork meat is the most common meat in the Bulgarian cuisine. Oriental dishes do exist in Bulgarian cuisine with most common being moussaka, gyuvetch, and baklava. A very popular ingredient in Bulgarian cuisine is the Bulgarian white brine cheese called "sirene" (сирене). It is the main ingredient in many salads, as well as in a variety of pastries. Fish and chicken are widely eaten and while beef is less common as most cattle are bred for milk production rather than meat, veal is a natural byproduct of this process and it is found in many popular recipes. Bulgaria is a net exporter of lamb and its own consumption of the meat is prevalent during its production time in spring. The bread and salt tradition, which is widespread among Balto-Slavs, is the usual welcome given to strangers and politicians.

=== Folk beliefs and customs ===
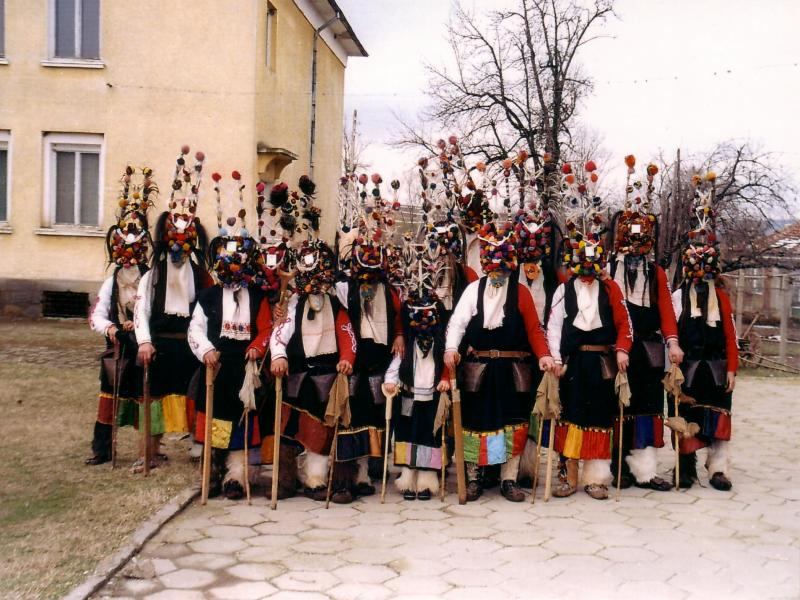
Kukeri from the area of Burgas

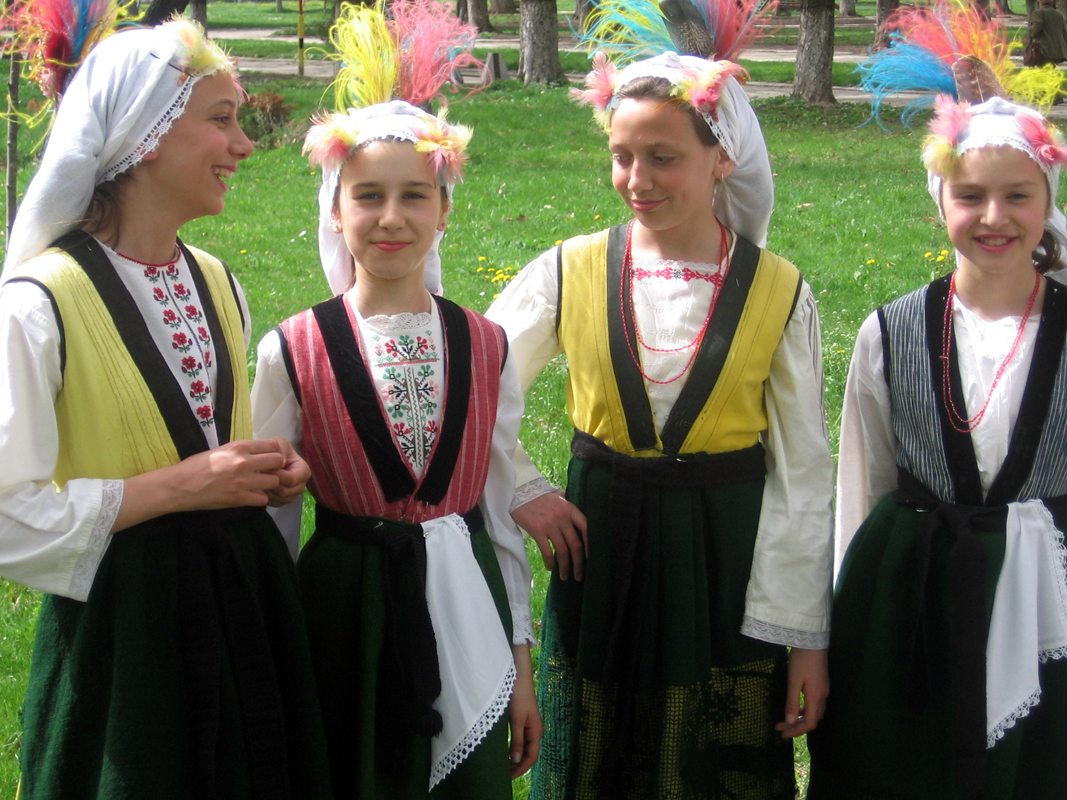
Girls celebrating Lazaruvane from Gabra, Sofia Province

Bulgarians may celebrate Saint Theodore's Day with horse racings. At Christmas Eve a Pogača with fortunes is cooked, which are afterwards put under the pillow. At Easter the first egg is painted red and is kept for a whole year. On the Baptism of Jesus a competition to catch the cross in the river is held and is believed the sky is "opened" and any wish will be fulfilled.

Bulgarians as well as Albanians nod the head up and down to indicates "no" and shake to indicate "yes". They may wear the martenitsa (мартеница)—an adornment made of white and red yarn and worn on the wrist or pinned on the clothes—from 1 March until the end of the month. Alternatively, one can take off the martenitsa earlier if one sees a stork (considered a harbinger of spring). One can then tie the martenitsa to the blossoming branch of a tree. Family-members and friends in Bulgaria customarily exchange martenitsas, which they regard as symbols of health and longevity. When a stork is seen, the martenitsa should be left on a tree. The white thread represents peace and tranquility, while the red one stands for the cycles of life. Bulgarians may also refer to the holiday of 1 March as Baba Marta (Баба Марта), meaning Grandmother March. It preserves an ancient pagan tradition, possibly celebrating the old Roman new Year, beginning on 1 March, identical with Romanian Mărțișor. Pagan customs found their way to the Christian holidays.

The ancient ritual of kukeri (кукери), similar to Slovenian Kurentovanje, Busójárás and Halloween, is performed by costumed men in different times of the year and after Easter. This seeks to scare away evil spirits and bring good harvest and health to the community. Goat is symbolized, that was left from the Thracian cult of Dionysian Mysteries. The ritual consists of dancing, jumping, shouting and collect gifts from the houses in an attempt to banish all evil from the village. The adornments on the costumes vary from one region to another. The Thracian Heros remains in the image of Saint George, at whose feast the agriculture is celebrated, a lamb is traditionally eaten, accomplished with ritual bathing. Saint Tryphon's fertility and wine is attributed a Thracian origin, considered to preserve the cult to Sabazius as the Kukeri. This is followed in February by Pokladi, a tradition of setting massively large fire and jump over as at the Kupala Night and a competition between couples to eat an egg on a thread is held. Another characteristic custom called nestinarstvo (нестинарство), or firedancing, distinguishes the Strandzha region, as well as Dog spinning. The authentic nestinarstvo with states of trance is only preserved in the village Balgari. This ancient custom involves dancing into fire or over live embers. Women dance into the fire with their bare feet without suffering any injury or pain.

Slavic pagan customs are preserved in Bulgarian Christian holidays. The Miladinov brothers and foreign authors noticed that even pagan prayers are preserved quoting plenty of Slavic pagan rite songs and tales remained in Bulgarians, including Macedonians and Pomaks, mainly dedicated to the divine nymphs samovili and peperuna for the feasts surva, Saint George's Day, Koleda, etc. with evidence of toponymy throughout the regional groups linking directly to the deities Svarog, Perun, Hors and Veles, while the regional group Hartsoi derive their name from god Hors. Songs dedicated to the Thracian divinity Orpheus were found in Pomaks, who is said to marry the samovili. The old Bulgarian name of the Presentation of Jesus at the Temple was Gromnitsa and Perunov den dedicated to the supreme Slavic thunder god Perun. In the mix of Christian and pagan patrons of thunder, at Saint Elijah's feast day Ognyena Maria is worshiped, the Slavic goddesses assisting Perun that took a substitutional dual position of the Christian Mother of God. The custom for rain begging Peperuna is derived from the wife of Perun and the god of the rain Dodola, this was described by a 1792 Bulgarian book as a continued worship of Perun at times of absence of rain with a ritual performed by a boy or a girl dressed like Perun. Similar rain begging is called German. In case of continuous lack of rain, a custom of driving out the zmey from the area is performed. In the dualistic Slavic belief the zmey may be both good tutelary spirit and evil, in which case is considered not local and good, but evil and trying to inflict harm and drought. Saint Jeremiah's feast is of the snakes and the reptiles, there is a tradition of jumping over fire. At the Rusalka week the girls don't go outside to prevent themselves from diseases and harm that the dead forces Rusalii can cause. This remained the holiday of the samovili. The men performing the custom are also called Rusalii, they don't let anybody pass through between them, don't talk with each other except for the evening, avoid water, if someone lacks behind a member swoops the sword over the lacker's head to prevent him from evil spirits. If the group encounter on their way a well, dry tree, old cemeteries, crossroads, they go round them three times. Before leaving rusalii say goodbye to their relatives as if they went to war, which is not surprising because some of them are killed. When two rusalii groups met there was a fight to the death in which the dead were buried in special "rusaliyski cemetery." Each year there are holidays in honour of wolves and mouses. A relief for the scared believers is celebrated at the Beheading of St. John the Baptist, when according to Bulgarian belief all the mythical figures go back to their caves in a mythical village in the middle of nowhere Zmeykovo of the zmey king, along with the rusalki, samodivi, and return at Annunciation. According to other beliefs the danger peaks at the so-called few days around the New Year Eve "Dirty Days", this time starts at Koleda, which merged with Christmas, when groups of kids koledari visit houses, singing carols and receiving a gift at parting. It is believed that no man can go in Zmeyovo and only the magpie knows the location of this place. At many of the holidays a sexual taboo is said to be practiced to prevent conceiving a vampire or werewolf and not to work, not to go to Sedenki or go out. Live-fire is set in case of epidemics. Babinden for example is rooted in the mother-goddess. On the day of St. Vlas, the tradition of a "wooly" god Veles established itself, a god who is considered to be a protector of shepherds, and bread is given to the livestock on that day. The ancient Slavic custom to marry died people occurred in Bulgarian society. Survakane is performed each new year with a decorated stick by children, who hit adults on the back for health at the New Year Eve, usually in exchange of money. In the Chech region there is a custom forbidding "touching the land", i.e. construction and agriculture, at the equinox on 25 March and the same custom is found in Belarusian Volhynia and Polesia.

Bulgarian mythology and fairy tales are mainly about forest figures, such as the dragon zmey, the nymphs samovili (samodivi), the witch veshtitsa. They are usually harmful and devastating, but can also help the people. The samovili are said to live in beeches and sycamores the, which are therefore considered holy and not permitted burning. Samovili, although believed to be masters of everything between the sky and the earth, "run away" from fraxinus, garlic, dew and walnut. Walnut remained in Christianity to be used in prayers to "see" the dead in Spirits Day. Dictamnus is believed to be their favourite herb, which is intoxicating. The samovili are spirits in Bulgarian beliefs are the diseases themselves and punish people, kidnap shepherds, make blind the people or drown them and are in white colored dress, they are in odd numbers, which suggest they are ones of the "dead". Epic heroes as Prince Marko are believed to be descended from the samodivi. The elm is believed to scare the evil forces. Sacral trees in Bulgarian beliefs are beeches and oaks. Hawthorn is believed to expel all evil forces and is applied to cure suspected vampires. The tradition forbids killing of sacred animals – deer, while it is hold a belief the samodivi runaway from horse. The alleged as "unclean" animals resembling the devil such as the goat are, however, exempted from being eaten as the holy ones. The zmey is transhuman and can turn "into" animals, plants and items, he is also "responsible" for diseases, madness and missing women. The female version of the Slavic zmey is Lamia and Ala is another version. The girls who practiced Lazaruvane and other rituals "could not" be kidnapped by the zmey. The main enemy of the Sun is the zmey, which tries to eat the Sun, which scene is preserved in church art. The sun is painted one eyed as recorded by beliefs Perun stabbed one of the sun's eyes to save the world from overheating.

The born on Saturday are thought as having supernatural powers, those born at the wolves' holidays and a number of people are alleged as varkolaks and vampires. The most spread Bulgarian view of the vampire was that of a rolling bulbous balloon of blood derived from the Slavic term pir "drink".

Rusalka is believed to be a variety of the samodivi and Nav, but the latter are considered little fairies. The Thursdays remained feasts of Perun in Bulgarian beliefs. The wind and the hot steam of the bread is believed to be the souls of the dead. From Easter to Feast of the Ascension it is believed that the death are in the flowers and the animals. Mora in Bulgarian beliefs is a black hairy evil spirit with four firing eyes associated with nightmares when causing someone to scream, similarly to Kikimora. Polunoshtnitsa and Poludnica are believed to be evil spirits causing death, while to Lesnik, Domovnik and Vodnik a dualistic nature is attributed. Thanks to the Vlshebnik, a man of the community, a magician and a priest, communication with the "other" world was held. Torbalan is the Sack Man used to scare children, along with Baba Yaga, who is a witch in her Bulgarian version.

Kuma Lisa and Hitar Petar are the tricky fox and villager from the fairy tales, the tricked antagonist is often Nasreddin Hoca, whereas Bay Ganyo is a ridiculed Bulgarian villager. Ivancho and Mariika are the protagonists of the jokes.

Despite eastern Ottoman influence is obvious in areas such as cuisine and music, Bulgarian folk beliefs and mythology seem to lack analogies with Turkic mythology, paganism and any non-European folk beliefs, so in pre-Christian times the ancient Bulgars were much inferior to the Slavs in the ethnogenesis and culture that resulted in modern Bulgarians. The Slavic language was officialized at the same time with Christianity, so Slavic paganism has never been a state religion of Bulgaria or more influential than Tengriism. Most of Bulgarian land lack any pagan archeology left from the Bulgars, despite early Christianization and that during most of the pagan period medieval Bulgarian borders spread significantly only in today's northern Bulgaria. Although legacy indicating ancient Bulgar culture is at most virtually absent in modern Bulgarian culture, some authors claim there is a similarity between the dress and customs of the Chuvashes, who descend from the Volga Bulgars, and the Bulgarian ethnographic group Kapantsi from Targovishte Province and Razgrad Province, among whom the claim that they are direct descendants of Asparuh's Bulgars is popular, but Slavic elements are found among them.

=== Folk dress and music ===
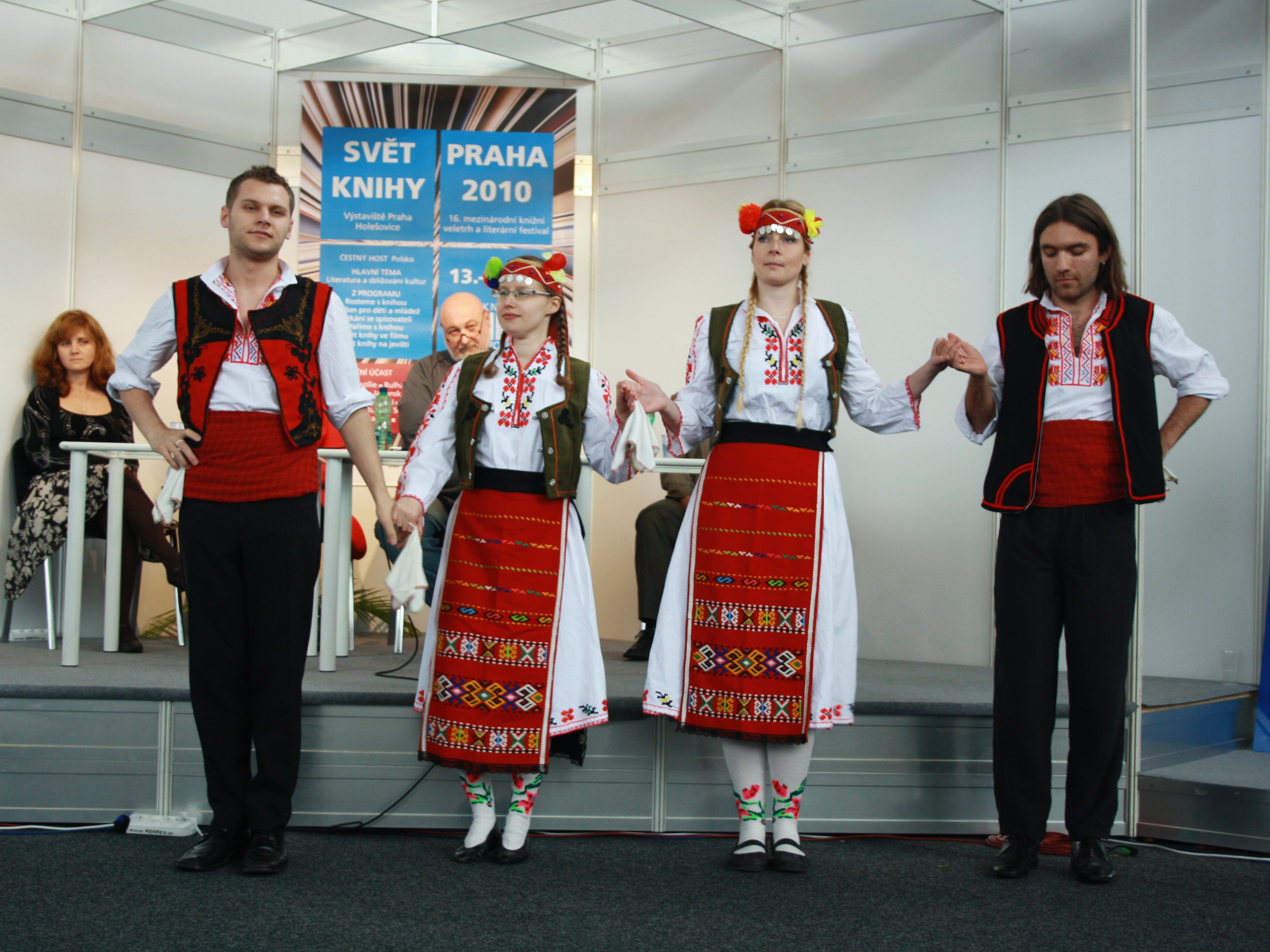
Bulgarian folk dancers in a national costume with embroidery on the penultimate row of the aprons showing the most spread Slavic cryptogram Bur with a cross inside the rhombus representing the sun and spirals indicating rain, which is similarly represented as the Rising Sun decorative pattern of the Flag of Belarus. Similar carpet patterns appear on the Flag of Turkmenistan ultimately derived from ancient Persia.

Bulgarian folk costumes feature long white robes, usually with red embroidery and ornaments derived from the Slavic Rachenik. The costume is considered to be mainly derived from the dress of the ancient Slavs, the female dress with the overgarments joined at the shoulders that evolved from Sarafan and all the types of sukman, saya and aprons fasten at the waist are said to be directly descended from the ancient Slavs only with negligible mutation. The women's head-dress, which turned to be a must for the Bulgarian costume is a decoration with flowers optionally on a headband, that distinguishes all the Balto-Slavic peoples and is not found in western cultures. The male dress is of likewise origin, usually Riza "robe", poyas "belt", poturi "full-bottomed breeches" typical for the Slavs and often a tsarvul and kalpak for shoes and jacket. Among the most similar relatives of the latter for example is Ukrainian hutsul, but the kalpak is attributed to Ottoman influence. The male skirt fustanella appears on the dress only of the Macedonian Bulgarians and is of indigenous Balkan origin or influence. In some dress of Thrace the symbol of the snake as in medieval tombs is found and is considered a Thracian cultural legacy and belief.

Folk songs are most often about the nymphs from Bulgarian and West Slavic mythology (samovili) and the epic heroes (yunaks). Instruments Gadulka, Gusla, Duduk, gaida Dvoyanka are analogous to other Slavic gudok, dudka and Dvodentsivka. Kaval is common in the Balkans and Turkey and is akin to Arab Kawala, as well as Tapan, Goblet Drum, Zurna. The most spread dance is a circle dance called horo and khorovod. Songs are generally loud. Recent eastern influences from the genre music chalga and turbo-folk even brought a prestige for the masculine voices of females.

Valya Balkanska is a folk singer thanks to whom the Bulgarian speech in her song "Izlel ye Delyo Haydutin" will be played in the Outer space for at least 60,000 years more as part of the Voyager Golden Record selection of music included in the two Voyager spacecraft launched in 1977.

=== Sport ===
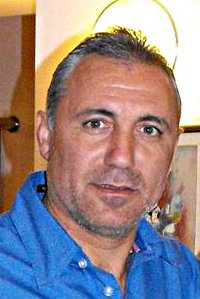
Hristo Stoichkov, awarded the Ballon d'Or and regarded as one of the best footballers by Barcelona.

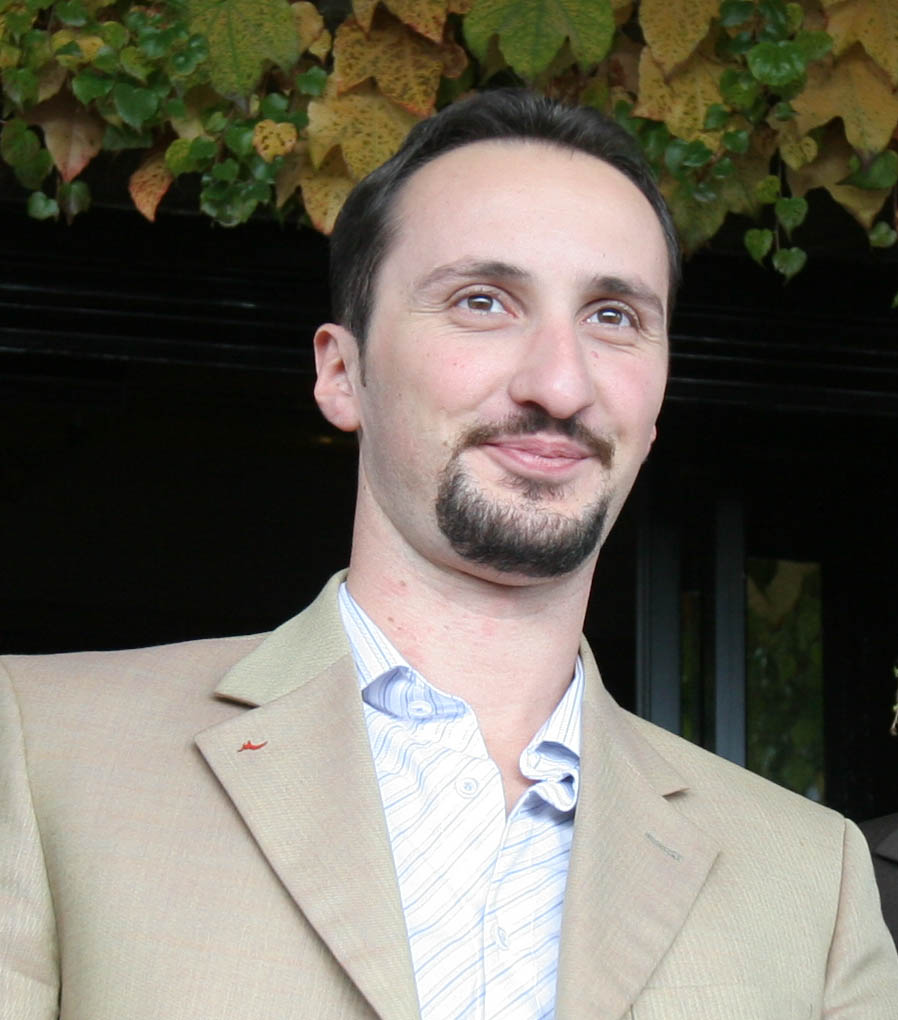
Veselin Topalov, the 21st World Chess Champion.

As for most European peoples, football became by far the most popular sport for the Bulgarians. Hristo Stoichkov was one of the best football (soccer) players in the second half of the 20th century, having played with the national team and FC Barcelona. He received a number of awards and was the joint top scorer at the 1994 World Cup. Dimitar Berbatov, formerly in Manchester United, Tottenham Hotspur, Bayer Leverkusen and others, the national team and two domestic clubs, is still the most popular Bulgarian football player of the 21st century.

In the beginning of the 20th century Bulgaria was famous for two of the best wrestlers in the world – Dan Kolov and Nikola Petroff. Stefka Kostadinova is the best female high jumper, still holding the world record from 1987, one of the oldest unbroken world records for all kind of athletics. Ivet Lalova along with Irina Privalova is currently the fastest white woman at 100 metres. Kaloyan Mahlyanov has been the first European sumo wrestler to win the Emperor's Cup in Japan. Veselin Topalov won the 2005 World Chess Championship. He was ranked No. 1 in the world from April 2006 to January 2007, and had the second highest Elo rating of all time (2813). He regained the world No. 1 ranking again in October 2008.

=== Symbols ===
The national symbols of the Bulgarians are the Flag, the Coat of Arms, the National anthem and the National Guard, as well other unofficial symbols such as the Samara flag.

The national flag of Bulgaria is a rectangle with three colours: white, green, and red, positioned horizontally top to bottom. The colour fields are of same form and equal size. It is generally known that the white represents – the purity, the green – the forest and nature and the red – the blood of the people, referencing the strong bond of the nation through all the wars and revolutions that have shaken the country in the past. The Coat of arms of Bulgaria is a state symbol of the sovereignty and independence of the Bulgarian people and state. It represents a crowned rampant golden lion on a dark red background with the shape of a shield. Above the shield there is a crown modeled after the crowns of the emperors of the Second Bulgarian Empire, with five crosses and an additional cross on top. Two crowned rampant golden lions hold the shield from both sides, facing it. They stand upon two crossed oak branches with acorns, which symbolize the power and the longevity of the Bulgarian state. Under the shield, there is a white band lined with the three national colours. The band is placed across the ends of the branches and the phrase "Unity Makes Strength" is inscribed on it.

Both the Bulgarian flag and the Coat of Arms are also used as symbols of various Bulgarian organisations, political parties and institutions.

The horse of the Madara Rider is preserved on the back of the Bulgarian stotinka.

== Maps ==
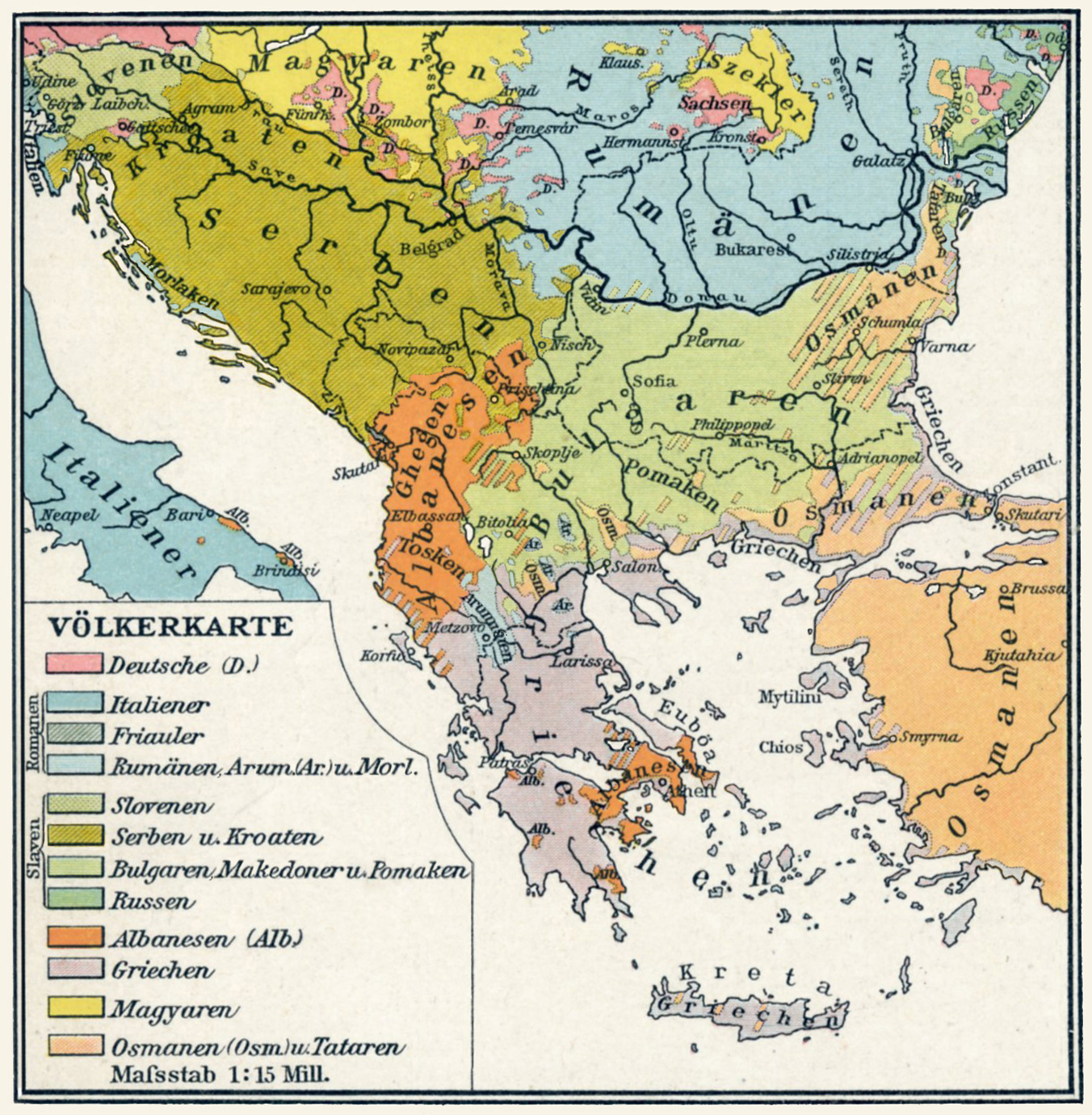
Map of A. Scobel, Andrees Allgemeiner Handatlas, 1908

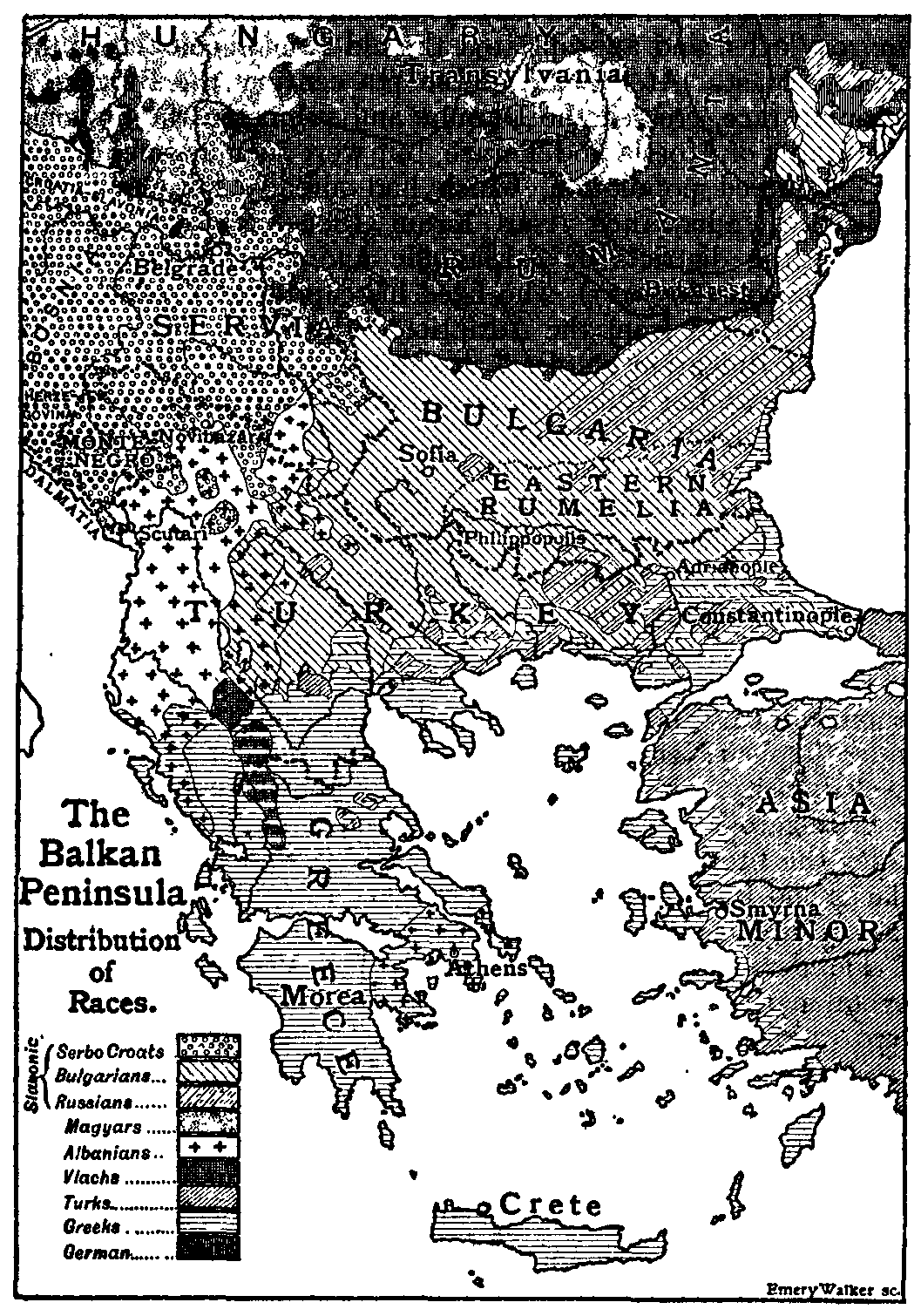
Distribution of the Balkan peoples in 1911, Encyclopædia Britannica

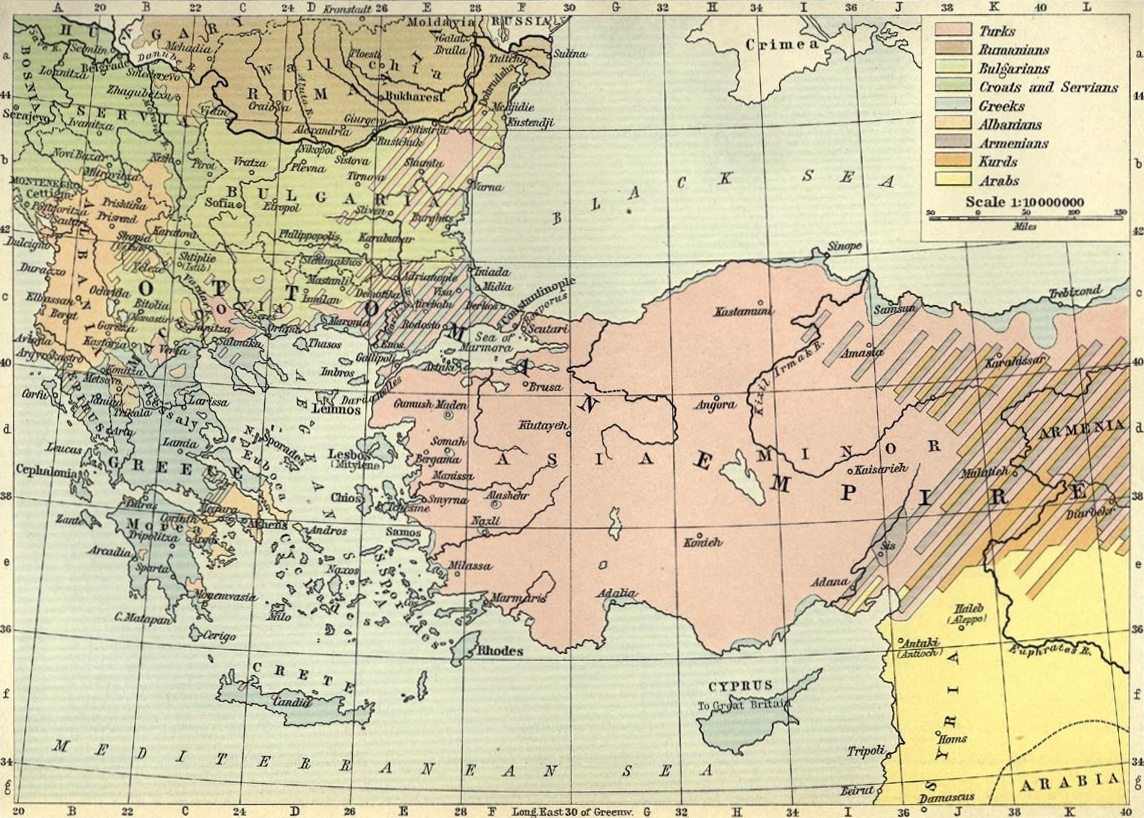
Ethnic groups in the Balkans and Asia Minor by William R. Shepherd, 1911

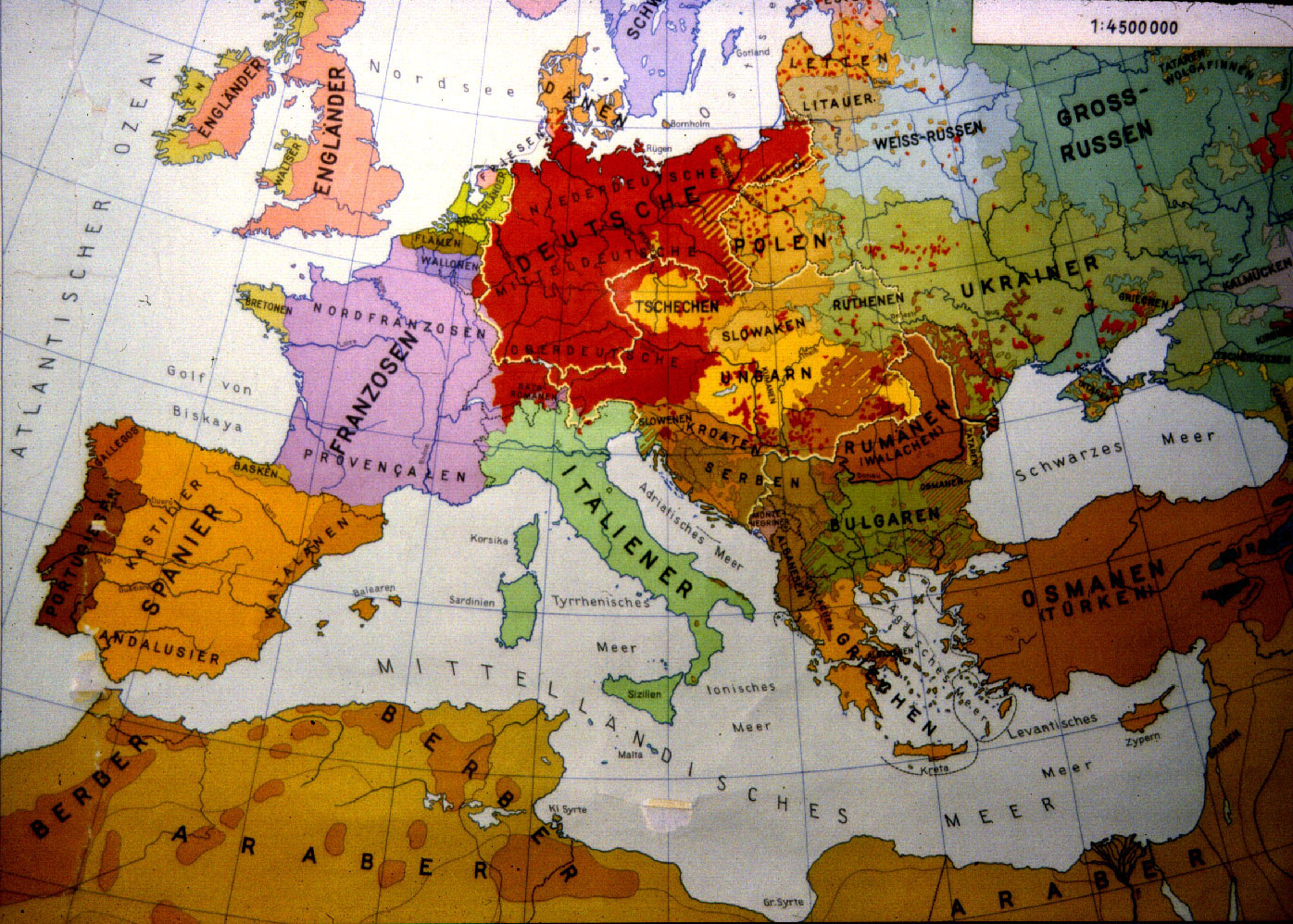
Distribution of European peoples in 1914 according to L. Ravenstein

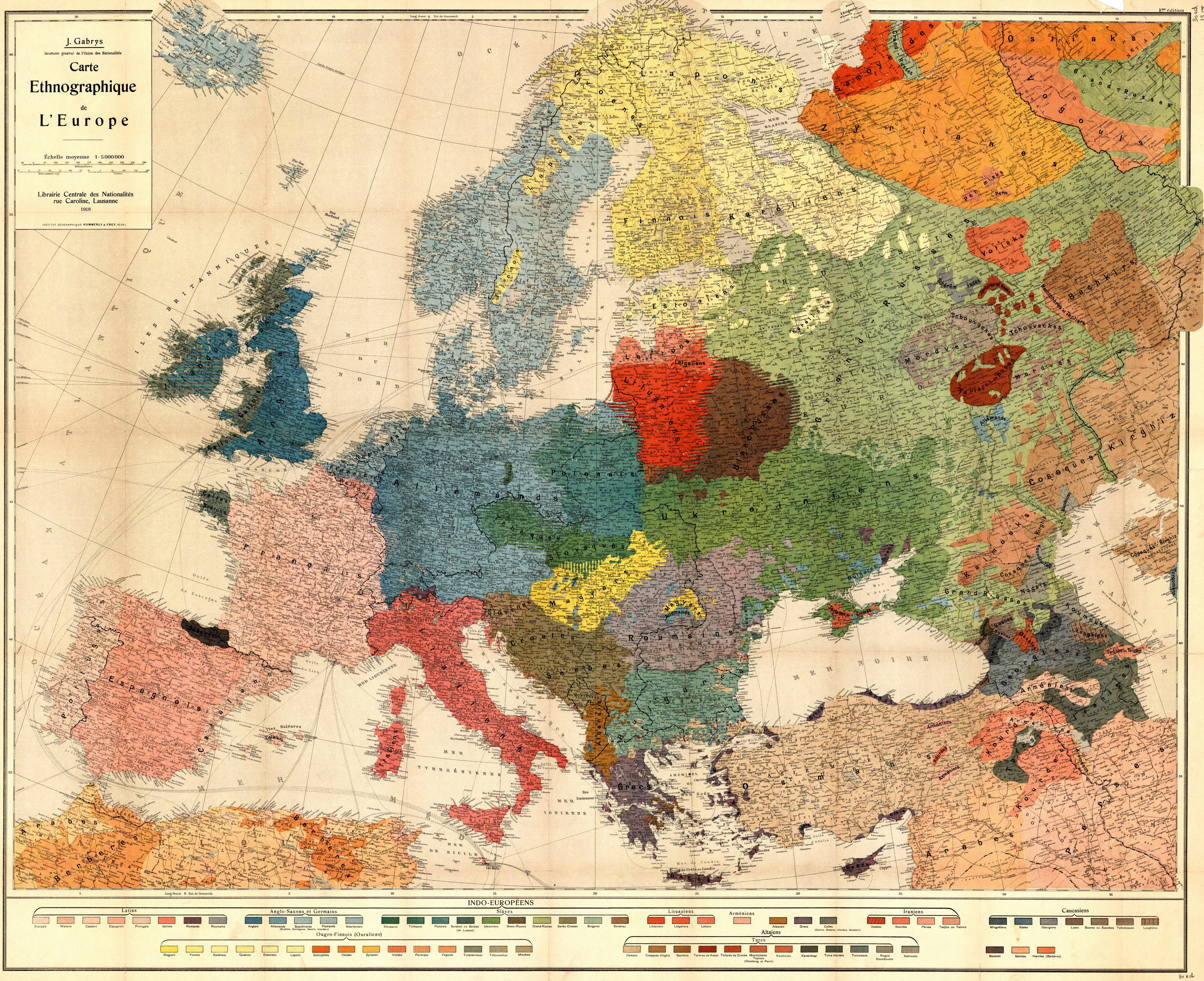
Swiss ethnographic map of Europe published in 1918 by Juozas Gabrys

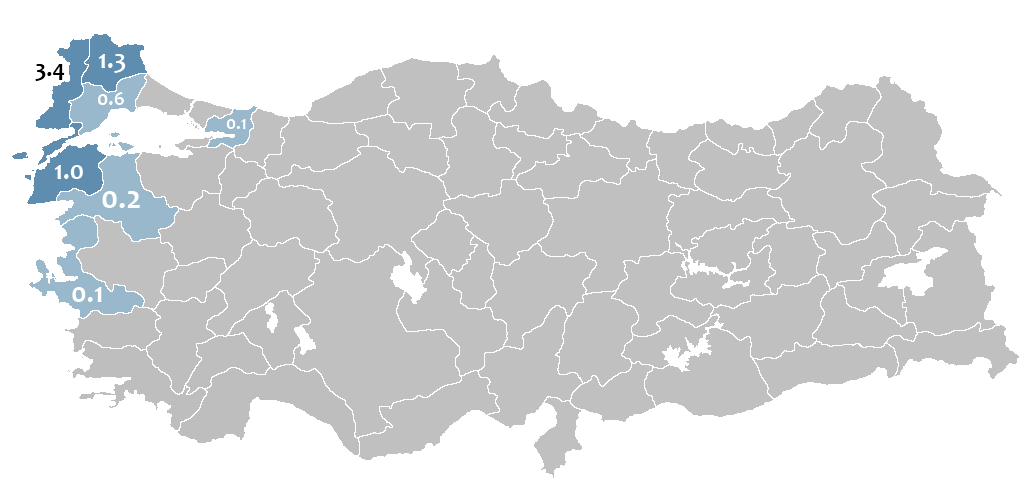
Percentage of Pomaks by first language according to the 1965 Census excluding Bulgarian

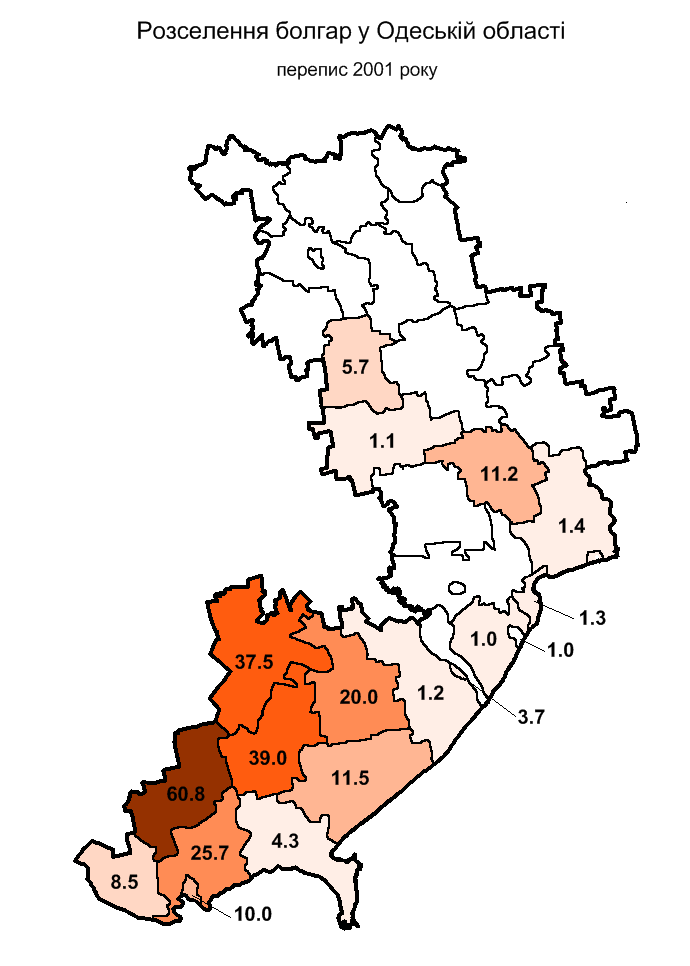
Distribution of Bulgarians in Odesa Oblast, Ukraine according to the 2001 census

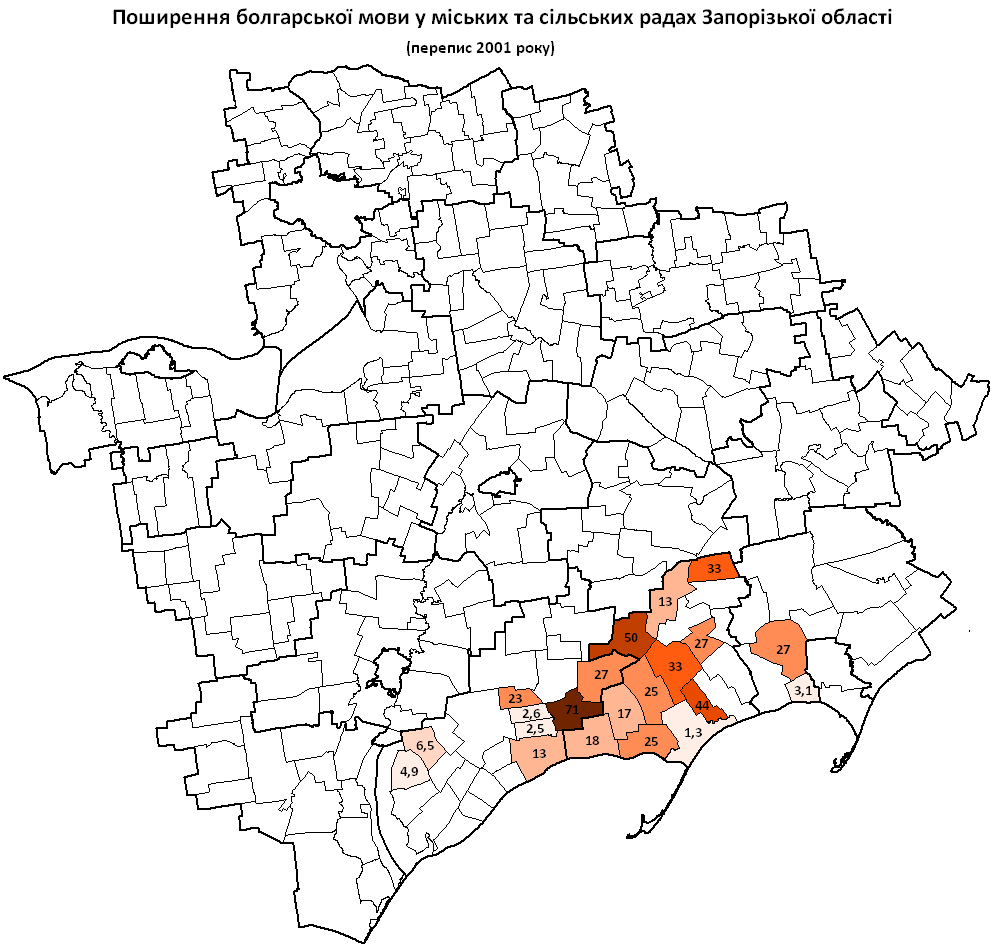
Distribution of Bulgarians by first language in Zaporizhzhia Oblast, Ukraine according to the 2001 census

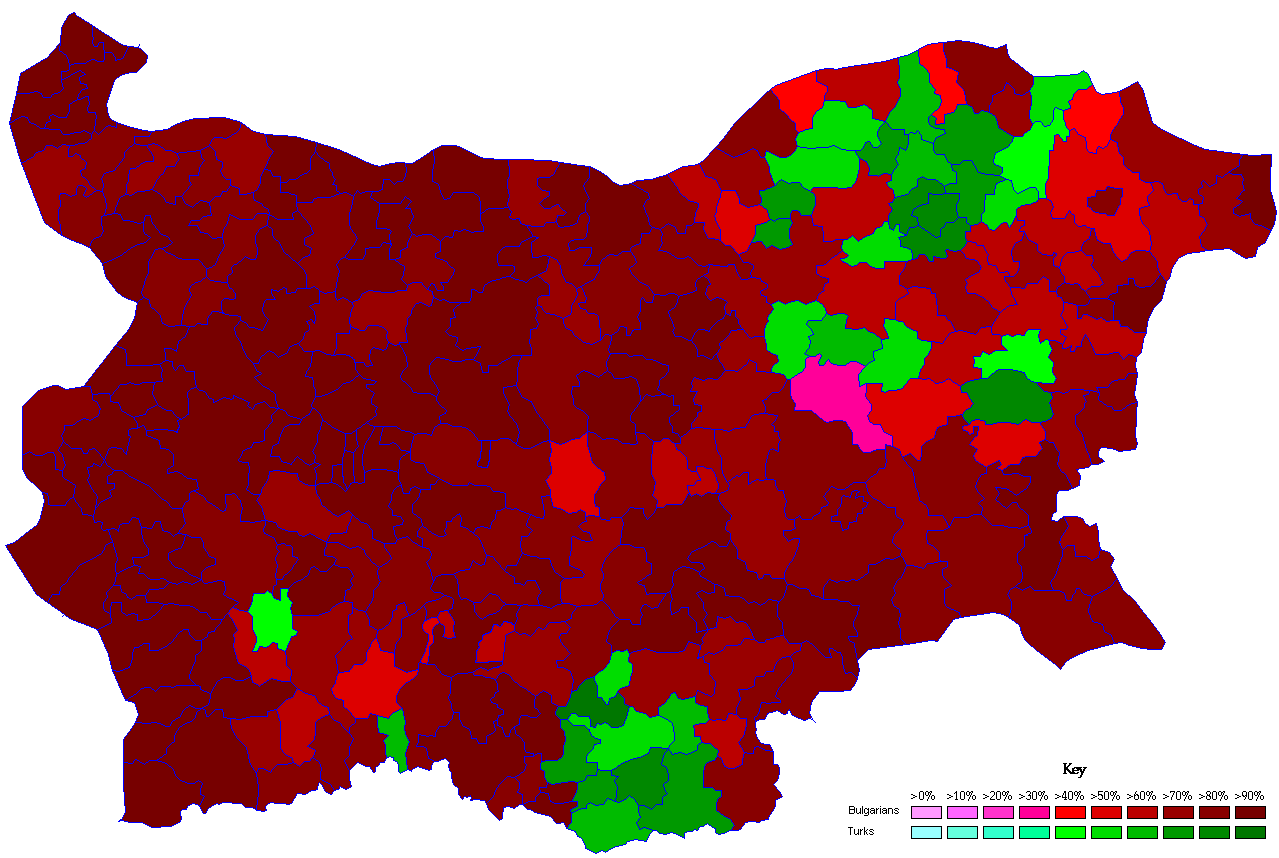
Distribution of predominant ethnic groups in Bulgaria according to the 2011 census

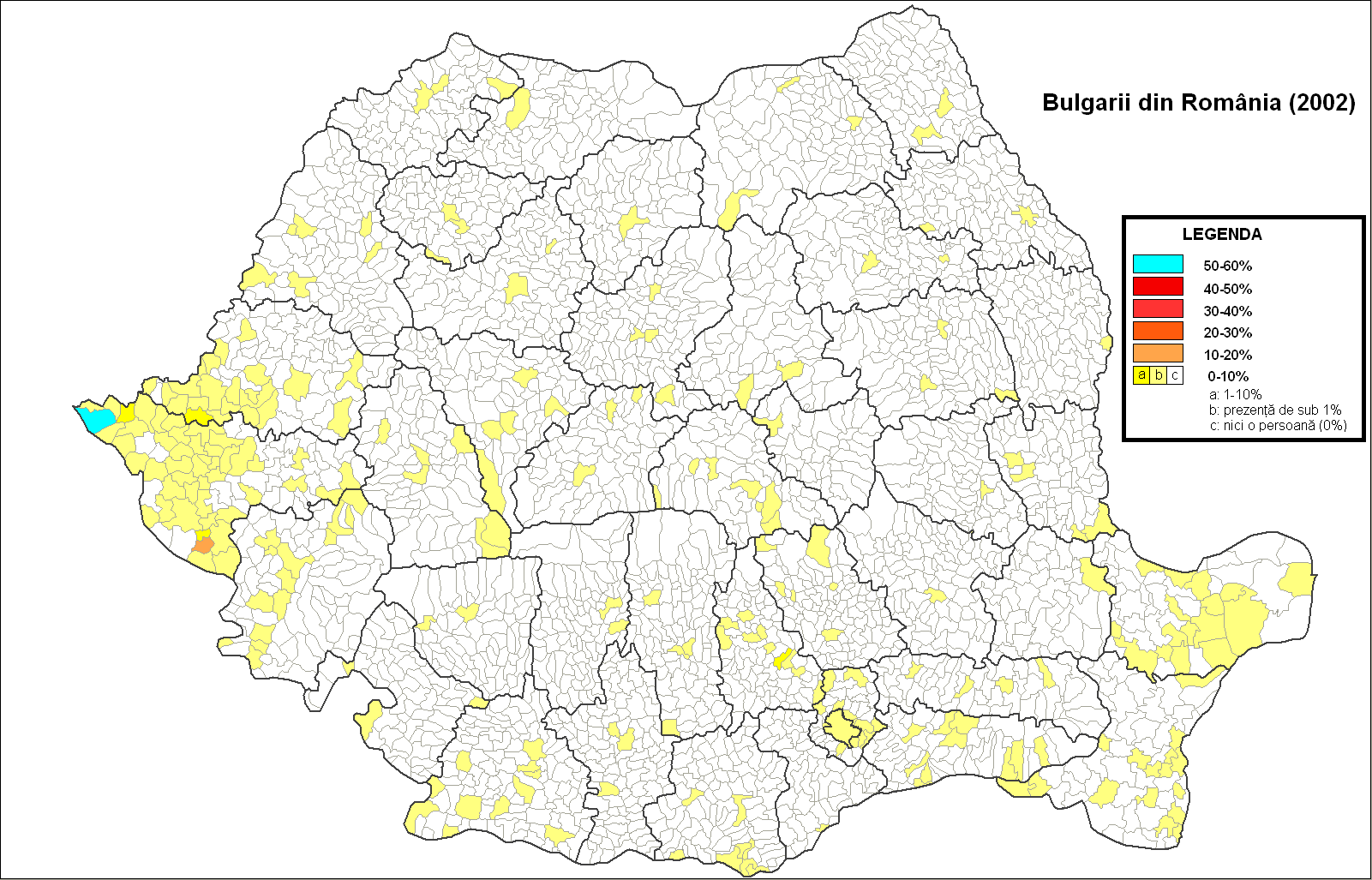
Distribution of Bulgarians in Romania according to the 2002 census

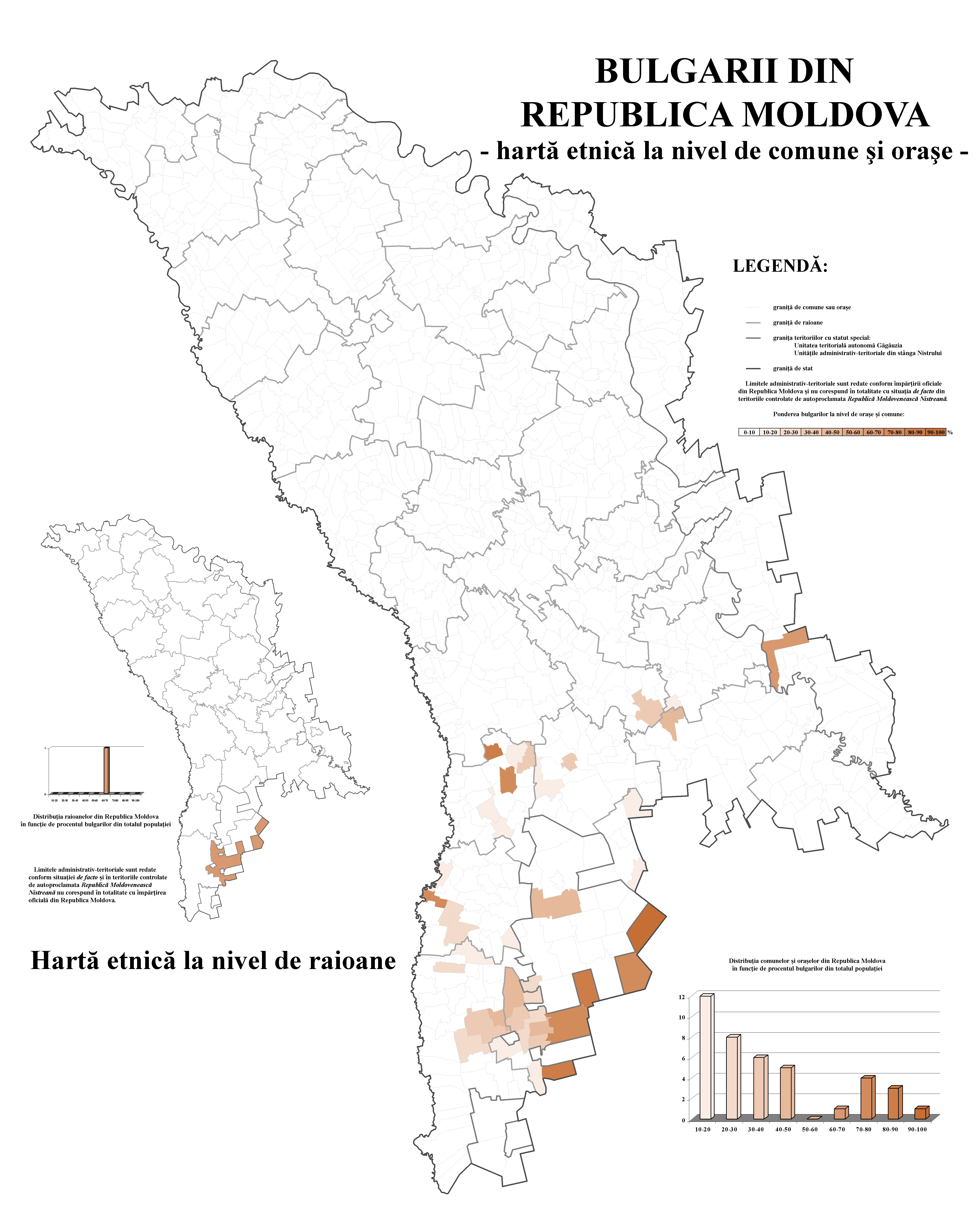
Distribution of Bulgarians in Moldova according to the 2004 census

== Historiography ==
With the formation of the Bulgarian ethnicity in the mid-10th century, the Byzantines usually called the Bulgarians Moesi, and their lands, Moesia.

== See also ==
- Balkan–Danubian culture
- List of Bulgarians
- Thracian Bulgarians

== Sources ==
- Komatina, Predrag (2010). "The Slavs of the mid-Danube basin and the Bulgarian expansion in the first half of the 9th century" (PDF). Зборник Радова Византолошког Института. 47: 55–82.
- Obolensky, Dimitri (1974) [1971]. The Byzantine Commonwealth: Eastern Europe, 500–1453. London: Cardinal. ISBN 978-0-351-17644-9.
- Ostrogorsky, George (1956). History of the Byzantine State. Oxford: Basil Blackwell.
