= İzel =

- Gender: unisex
- Language: Turkish, Ladino, Spanish

Origin
- Language: Turkish
- Origin: "iz"
- Derivation: "iz"+"el (suffix)"
- Meaning: varies

Other names
- Anglicisation: Izel

İzel is a rare feminine Turkish given name. In Nahuatl, Izel means "only one", "unique".

== People ==
- İzel Çeliköz, Turkish pop singer.
- İzel Hara, a Turkish radio comedian in Number 1 FM (see Turkish Wikipedia article).
- Izel Jenkins, American footballer
- İzel Rozental, a Turkish caricaturist of Jewish origin, a businessman, and a columnist writing for Şalom (see Turkish Wikipedia article).

== Fictional characters ==
- Izel (Marvel Cinematic Universe)

== See also ==
- Izlel ye Delyo Haydutin
- Izel-lès-Hameau
