= Silver bullet =

Folkloric weapon

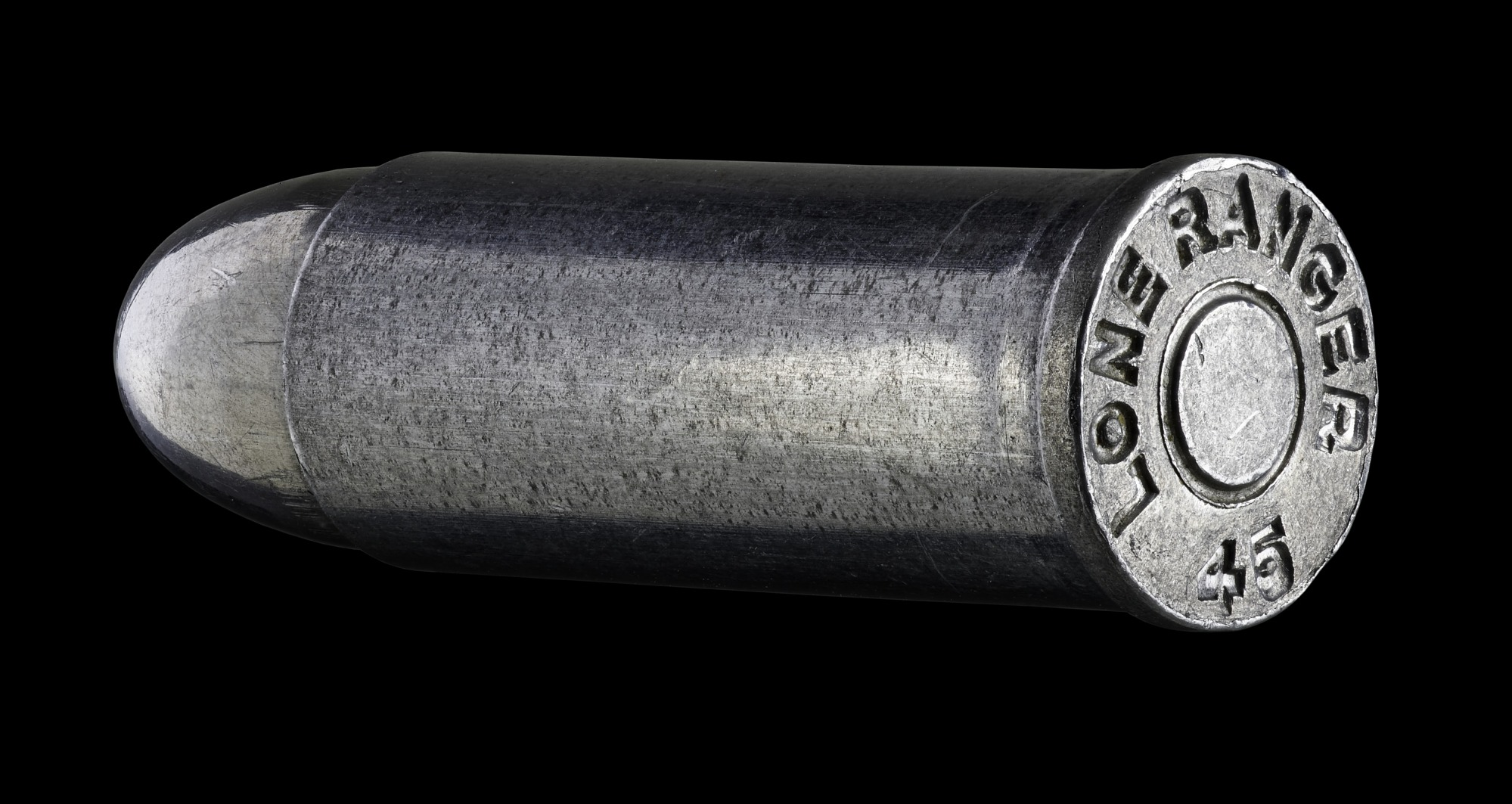
A prop silver bullet, as used by the Lone Ranger (actually made of aluminium); the effectiveness of real silver bullets compared to lead ones is not entirely known.

In folklore, a silver bullet is often one of the few weapons that are effective against a werewolf, vampire, witch, or other supernatural being.

The term silver bullet is also sometimes used similarly to "magic bullet" as a metaphor for a simple, seemingly magical, solution to a difficult problem: for example, penicillin c. 1930 was a "silver bullet" or magic bullet that allowed doctors to treat and successfully cure many bacterial infections.

== In folklore ==
Some authors asserted that the idea of the werewolf's supposed vulnerability to bullets cast from silver dates back to the Beast of Gévaudan, a man-eating animal killed by the hunter Jean Chastel in the year 1767. However, the allegations of Chastel purportedly using a gun loaded with silver bullets are derived from a distorted detail based primarily on Henri Pourrat's Histoire fidèle de la bête en Gévaudan (1946). In this novel, the French writer imagines that the beast was shot thanks to medals of the Virgin Mary, worn by Jean Chastel in his hat and then melted down to make bullets. A letter written 14 March 1765 by Madame de Franquières does mention silver bullets being used against the beast but states that they along with lead and iron bullets were ineffective. Élie Berthet's La Bête du Gévaudan (1858) reported that the hunter folded silver coin into his rifle.

An account of a resident of Jämtland, Sweden describes bullets of silver used as the means to kill were-bears in 1936. Inability of the great bear being invulnerable except to silver bullets also features in the 1891 novel Gösta Berling's Saga. Swedish folklore also describes silver bullets as effective against the skogsrå, and against the beguiling mermaid (sjöjungfru), as also told in Swedish-speaking parts of Finland. (Note: Specifically Nyland (Uusimaa, Finland) according to FSF II 3:1, p. 55 which states: "Rå (sjörå, skogsrå) dödat; med silverkula. Nyl." However, while 478.1 and 478.2 are localized in Karis, Nyland and both are cases of charcoal makers vs. skogsjungfru "wood maiden", 478.3 appears to be from Ål for Åland[?] and concerns the fisherman and sjöjungfru or mermaid.) A Swedish superstition held that carrying a human leg taken from the churchyard made one invulnerable except to a silver bullet.

In Icelandic folklore, offspring of a fox and cat such as Skoffín, Skuggabaldur, and centaur-like being the Finngálkn (also said to be a fox-cat hybrid) are said to be shot with silver bullet or silver button.

In the Brothers Grimm fairy-tale of The Two Brothers, a bullet-proof witch is shot down by silver buttons, fired from a gun.

In some epic folk songs about Bulgarian rebel leader Delyo, he is described as invulnerable to normal weapons, driving his enemies to cast a silver bullet in order to murder him.

== In popular culture ==
A number of fictional Wild West heroes used silver bullets as weapons, to symbolize their purity of heart. The best known of these was the Lone Ranger in all his incarnations: after solving the problem of the week, he would leave a silver bullet behind as his mark. Clayton Moore, who played the Ranger in the television series, was known to give away silver bullet props, made from aluminum, to fans in the 1950s.

Fantasy-horror has continued the use of silver bullets as monster-slayers.

In an untitled early Batman serial from 1939, written by Gardner Fox for Detective Comics issues 31 and 32, Batman declares that "only a silver bullet may kill a vampire," and swiftly forges such a weapon to defeat the coven of vampires who kidnapped Bruce Wayne's fiancée.

The 1941 film The Wolf Man, and its sequels and spinoffs, codified silver (whether in bullet form or otherwise) as the definitive death-dealer for werewolves, to the point where this weakness is often regarded as exclusive to lycanthropes. Notable film examples are Silver Bullet (1985) and Cursed (2005), with the latter being in part a self-referential spoof of the 1941 film.

The Strain novels by Guillermo del Toro and Chuck Hogan return the silver bullet to its earlier status as a weapon against the strigoi, who are broadly analogous to vampires.

== Ballistic effectiveness ==
Silver bullets differ from lead bullets in several respects. Lead has a 10% higher density than silver, so a silver bullet will have a little less mass than a lead bullet of identical dimensions. Pure silver is less malleable than lead and falls between lead and copper in terms of hardness (1.5 < 2.5 < 3.0 Mohs) and shear modulus (5.6 < 30 < 48 GPa). A silver bullet accepts the rifling of a gun barrel.

The terminal impact is somewhat speculative and will depend on a variety of factors including bullet size and shape, flight distance, and target material. At short ranges, the silver bullet will most likely give better penetration due to its higher shear modulus, and will not deform as much as a lead bullet.

A 2007 episode of MythBusters demonstrated a greater penetration depth of lead bullets versus silver bullets; the experiment utilized a 250-grain (16 g) lead slug in a .45-caliber Colt long shell vs a lighter, 190-grain (12 g) silver slug fired at closer range. Another MythBusters episode, from 2012, showed that silver bullets are less accurate than lead bullets when fired from an M1 Garand. Michael Briggs also did some experiments with silver bullets compared to lead bullets. After making a custom mold to ensure that the sizes of the silver bullets were comparable to the lead bullets, he fired them. He found that the silver bullets were slightly slower than the lead bullets and less accurate.

== See also ==
- Golden hammer
- List of topics characterized as pseudoscience
- M829A1, nicknamed the "Silver Bullet"
- Magic bullet (medicine)
- "No Silver Bullet"
- Silver Arrows (race cars)
- Silver lining (idiom)
