= Vasil Angelov =

Bulgarian military officer/revolutionary

- Born: March 12, 1882; Arda, Ottoman Empire
- Died: August 23, 1953 (aged 71); Razgrad, Bulgaria
- Organization: IMARO

Vasil Tomov Angelov (Bulgarian: Васил Томов Ангелов; March 12, 1882 – August 23, 1953) was a Bulgarian military officer and a revolutionary, a worker of the Internal Macedonian-Adrianople Revolutionary Organization (IMARO).

== Biography ==
Vasil Tomov was born in the Rhodopes village of Arda, in the Ottoman Empire. After he finished high school, he enrolled the Military school in Sofia, where he joined the IMARO. In January 1903 he finished school and became an officer with the rank of a second lieutenant and served in the Ninth Infantry Plovdiv Regiment, but in the same year he left the military and the Emigrant Representative Body of the IMARO sent him as a military instructor in the revolutionary region of Serres, where he joined the revolutionary band of Yane Sandanski.

In August 1903, Angelov was a delegate at the Ser region congress that took place in Livadkata, near the village of Pirin, where the action plan for the Ilinden-Preobrazhenie Uprising was developed. The congress appointed Angelov as leader of a band in the region of Demir Hisar. He and his band were given the task to investigate the possibilities to detonate the railroad bridge near Demir Hisar and the possibilities to seize the town itself. In the Ilinden-Preobrazhenie Uprising, he operated in the region of Demir Hisar together with Iliya Karchovaliyata and Lyubomir Stoenchev, but they did not manage to accomplish the plan to seize the town. When the uprising ended, Angelov and his revolutionary band went back to Bulgaria, where he joined again the Ninth regiment, but he continued to complete tasks given to him by the IMARO.

He participated in the wars for Bulgarian national liberation in the period 1912–1918. After 1919 he graduated medicine in Sofia and worked as a doctor in Razgrad, where he died in 1953.
