= Vechornytsi =

Slavic traditional social gathering

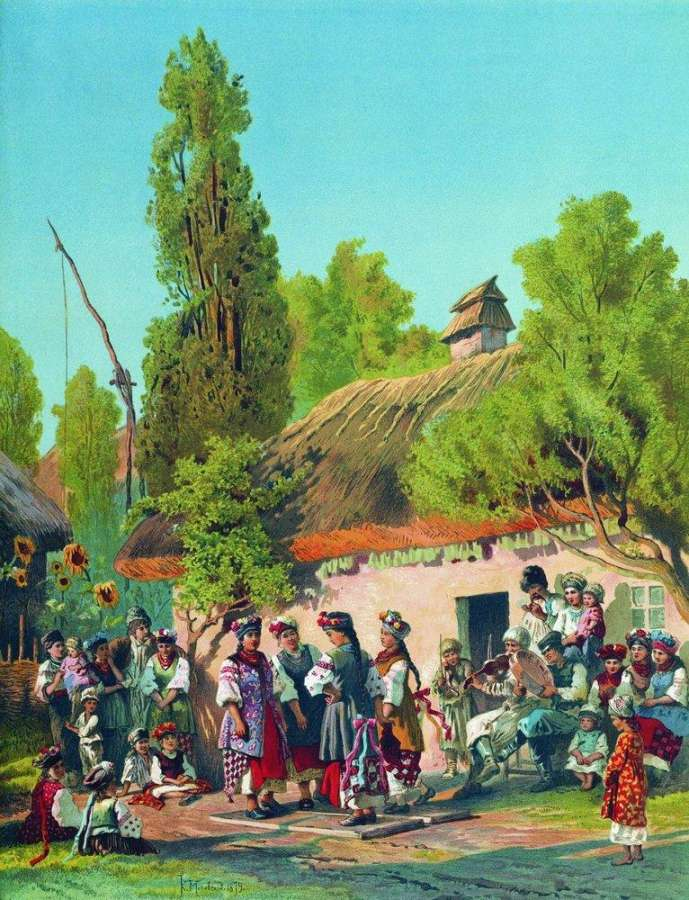
Konstantin Makovsky, Sunday evening in a Ukrainian village (1879)

Vechornytsi (Ukrainian: вечорниці), also known as dosvitky (Ukrainian: досвітки) is a Ukrainian tradition of youth gatherings accompanied with music, songs, jokes and rituals. Historically, such gatherings would be organized in a house owned by a childless widow (known as a vechornytsi mother), with food and other expenses being bought through a joint fund established by the participants, in a scheme similar to potluck.

== Description ==
Vechornytsi or dosvitky is a Ukrainian tradition of youth gatherings. Historically, such gatherings would be organized in a house, with food and other expenses being bought through a joint fund established by the participants, in a scheme similar to potluck.

Vechornytsi were held between the Pokrova Day and the last week before Lent and involved people as young as 14 years old. The girls would rent a house, normally from a childless widow (known as a vechornytsi mother) or a poor man. They would usually offer food, wood or cloth as rent, and bring their handicrafts to work on, which would be later used as dowries. The house would be visited by young men bringing bottles of horilka to drink. After a meal all those present would engage in dancing, joking, and games.

== Rituals ==
The most well-known vechornytsi took place on the eve of Saint Andrew's Day. In most regions of Ukraine the attribute of that celebration was kalyta - a large breadloaf, which would be hung under the ceiling and became an object of humorous games, with youths attempting to bite off a piece of it. Smaller loaves of bread would be used by girls on this evening for divination, with a dog being let into the house and allowed to eat the pastry: the girl whose bread would be taken first was said to be the first to get married. Another ritual involved putting cards with inscribed male names inside of varenyky, which would then be eaten by girls. Other forms of divination on that eve used wooden posts, fingerrings, coins, candles, grains, tree branches etc. Meanwhile boys on that evening would play practical jokes on fellow villagers, for example removing wooden gates, benches or carts and hiding them or buring them in snow. In cases when a personal grudge existed, for example due to the unwillingness of parents to marry their daughter to a particular young man, he and his companions could even disassemble the family's barn.

In some regions of Ukraine it was usual for youths participating in vechornytsi to form bonds with their female companions, and fights could emerge with representatives of other villages or localities if those were suspected of having affairs with "their" girls. In other locations, "swapping" of girls between young men from different areas could also take place. Girls who evaded participation in vechornytsi underwent obstruction, which could involve their houses being smeared with tar or "decorated" with obscene drawings.

== Sexual practices ==
In the late evening a common sleeping place would be covered with straw, and the youths and girls would divide into couples in order to spend the night together. During that kind of joint sleeping, bodily contact between members of a couple would be limited to kissing and touching. If mutual feelings arose during the process, the couple could look for a more solitary location, for example a barn. In some cases it could come to sexual contact without penetration, in order to preserve the girl's virginity. Despite such practices, parents didn't usually prevent their children from attending vechornytsi, and supplied them with money and food for the event.

== Government attitudes ==
Vechornytsi and similar youth games were persecuted both by Church and secular authorities. In 1719 a Universal by the Cossack hetman Ivan Skoropadsky responded to reports of promiscuity, sexual abuse and birth of illegitimate children by threatening any who participated in such events with the death penalty.
