= Babinden =

Traditional Bulgarian feast

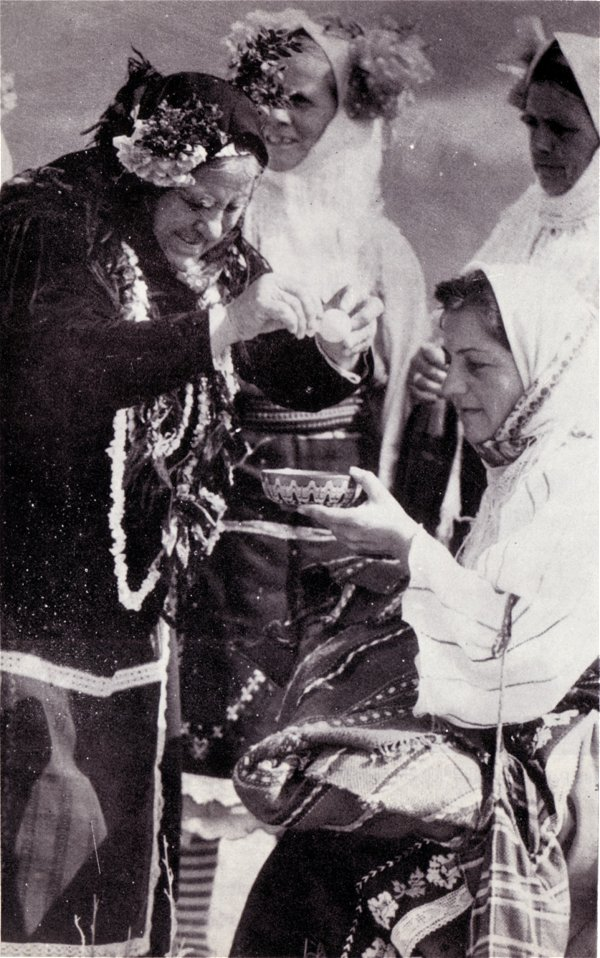
- Babinden in the Village of Senokos, Northeastern Bulgaria
- Observed by: Slavic people
- Type: Ethnic
- Celebrations: Feast of women in childbirth and midwives
- Date: 8 January (21 January according to the Gregorian calendar) in Bulgaria and Serbia; 26 December (8 January according to the Gregorian calendar) in Russia and Belarus
- Frequency: annual

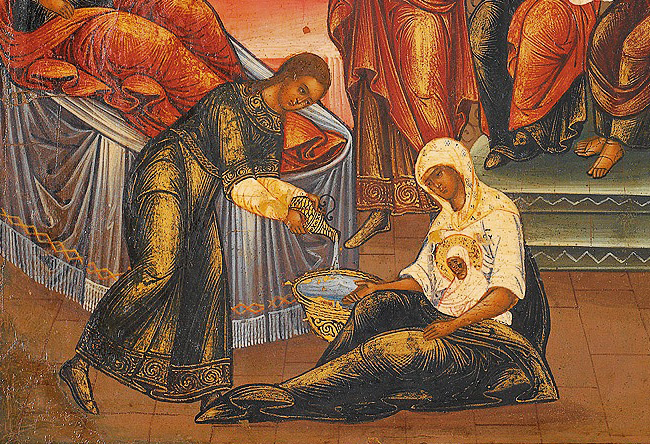
Icon Birth of Mary (detail). Russia

Babinden (Bulgarian: Бабинден, Russian: Бабьи каши, Бабий день the Day of the baba or the Day of the midwife) is a traditional Bulgarian feast, celebrated on 8 January (or in some areas 21 January according to the Gregorian calendar), in honour of the women practicing midwifery. The traditional word for midwife in Bulgarian is baba, same as grandmother. The holiday has pagan origins and is part of the traditional family rituals.

On Babinden, all children born in the previous year and their mothers gather at the house of the midwife to perform the following rituals:

- The bathing of the children by the midwife, followed by blessings, anointment of the babies with honey and butter and presenting the midwife of gifts (wool and ritual bread in the form of small pretzels). The ritual is performed to ensure health for all participants.
- The young mothers' feast. The young mothers (those who have given birth in the last one year) bring bread, banitsa (traditional cheese filo pastry akin to the Greek tiropita), grilled chicken and wine. They help the midwife wash and present her with new clothes - shirt, apron, kerchief, socks, etc.
- The bathing of the midwife (performed only in some parts of the country). After the young mothers' feast, the midwife is taken to the nearest water place (river, lake or well) and is ritually bathed.

Men may not participate in the rituals.

== Rituals ==
The baba holds a particularly exalted place in the traditional family life. She is universally honoured and loved for her skills in bringing about new life.

Just before sunrise the mothers of children under the age of three go to the common well to draw fresh water. In it they dip a sprig of basil or geranium. Then they take a bar of soap and a new towel and make way to the house of the midwife. The bathing ritual is performed outdoors - under a fruit tree in the garden, on the wood chopping block or on the front stairs of the house. (Traditional Bulgarian houses have their bottom floor half dug in the ground, under the street level; thus the main housing level is slightly elevated with a stone staircase leading to the front door of the house.) Every woman hands the midwife the soap, pours some water to wash her and then presents her with the new towel. The midwife, however, wipes her hands dry with the skirts of woman - to be fertile and to have easy deliveries. The midwife then presents the woman with a bunch of geraniums tied with red and white threads. While washing, the midwife may splash the water up in the air, jump three times and say "So may jump the kids and become white and red [eg healthy clear skin with rosy cheeks]! May the harvest and health be as abundant as these water droplets!" After the bathing the women present the midwife with gifts of shirts, socks, cloth, which they sling on her right shoulder. In return the midwife ties a bracelet of red and white threads with a silver coin on the right arm of each child she has delivered and gives him or her socks and shirts. Then she ritually washes the face of the child as it is believed that the water which passes the hands of the baba on Babinden has cleansing properties. In some part of Bulgaria it is customary for mothers to take their children to be blessed by the baba until the children reach the age of three.

The baba performs and another ritual role. Immediately after the delivery of the baby, the baba fills a clay jug with water, dips a sprig of basil or geranium in it and takes it to the church. There the priest blesses the water and the midwife, who then brings the holy water back to the mother. For the next forty days (traditionally, the cleansing period after childbirth) the mother is to use a little bit of the holy water in the baby daily bath.

At lunch time on Babinden the mothers prepare a feast in the house of the midwife. Every woman brings a freshly baked pogacha (ritual bread), banitsa, boiled or grilled chicken (traditionally, a hen is slaughtered) and a jug with wine or rakia (home-made fruit brandy). Each woman kisses the midwife's hand and gifts her the food. The daughters and daughters-in-law of the hostess set a long and rich table for all the guests. The dinner is accompanied with many songs, dances and much sexually-suggestive joking and banter. The midwife wears a string of red peppers around her neck and performs fertility rites as the dinner progresses. Only after the meal has concluded may the men join in.

The Feast of Babinden culminates in the ritual bathing of the midwife. The men and women guests take the baba outside and seat her in a carriage or a sleigh. In some parts of the country a large wicker basket is used. The men, dressed as oxen with hides, masks and horns, pull the carriage or sleigh around the village. If they meet a man on the way, the women ask for ransom. The merry company makes its way to the river and bathes the midwife. This particular ritual is called vlechugane (Haulage) of the midwife.

In the evening there is a feast at the town square. The traditional horo (a particular form of line dancing) is performed . The horo escorts the baba to her home. There everyone kisses her hand again and presents her with more gifts.

== Traditional beliefs ==
Children hold a special place in the Bulgarian culture. Many traditional sayings testify to this; for example "A childless house is a burnt house" and "The child is bigger than a king". There is a complex system of traditional beliefs about what should and should not be done in order to have an easy pregnancy and delivery, and a healthy child.

- Children should not be conceived on the night of Friday to Saturday.
- A pregnant woman may not kick a dog or a cat, step over fire tongs, eat a bread that has been left over from a journey, step on spilled water or litter.
- A pregnant woman may not steal and eat in secret because the stolen or the eaten item will manifest itself as a scarring or a birthmark on the baby.
- A pregnant woman should receive all she craves.
- If food is hidden from a pregnant woman, the baby will be a fastidious eater and sickly.
- A pregnant woman should be protected from becoming scared, startled or shocked.

For an easy delivery the baba should:

- make the sign of the cross three times,
- burn incense and bless with it the house,
- close all windows and doors and untie all that is bound.

The delivery itself is to be kept secret from all but the baba and the woman's mother-in-law.

Until the baby is baptised, the young mother should stay in bed and should not be left alone. These days are dangerous for her and the baby.

The fire in the house should not be put out until the 40th day.

== See also ==
- Bistritsa Babi
- Mary (mother of Jesus)
- Midwifery
