= Valya Balkanska =

Bulgarian folk music singer (born 1942)

Valya Balkanska Валя Балканска
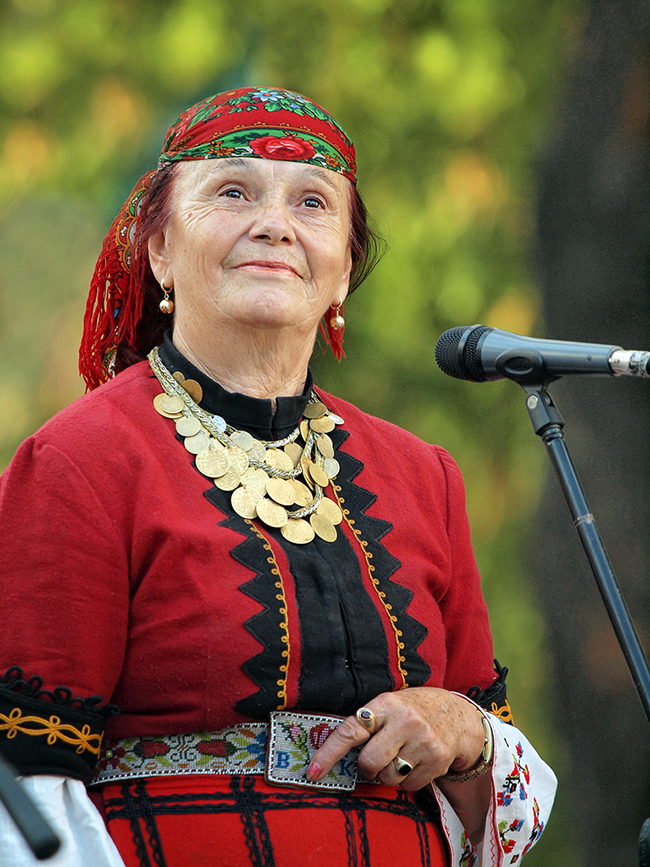

Background information
- Also known as: Valya Mladenova Balkanska
- Born: Feyme Kestebekova; 8 January 1942 (age 84); Arda, Kingdom of Bulgaria
- Genres: Balkan folk; Bulgarian folk
- Occupation: Solo singer
- Years active: 1960–present

Valya Mladenova Balkanska (Bulgarian: Валя Младенова Балканска; born Feyme Kestebekova, Bulgarian: Фейме Кестебекова; on 8 January 1942) is a Bulgarian folk singer from the Rhodope Mountains known locally for her wide repertoire of Balkan folk songs, but in the West mainly for singing the song "Izlel ye Delyo Haydutin", part of the selection of music encoded on the Voyager Golden Record, launched into space aboard the two Voyager spacecraft in 1977.

== Early life ==
Born as Feyme Kestebekova in a hamlet near the village of Arda, Smolyan Province, Balkanska has been singing Rhodope folk songs since her early childhood.

== Career ==
Balkanska performs a repertoire of over 300 songs in Bulgaria and abroad. Balkanska has been working with the Rodopa State Ensemble for Folk Songs and Dances from Smolyan, of which she is a soloist, since 1960. Her album Glas ot vechnostta (Voice from the Eternity), released in 2004, is a compilation of her best-known songs, including "A bre yunache ludo i mlado", "Goro le goro zelena", and "Maychinko stara maychinko".

=== "Izlel ye Delyo Haydutin" and Voyager ===
Balkanska is most famous in the West for "Izlel ye Delyo Haydutin", which she recorded in 1968 accompanied by the bagpipe (gaida) players Lazar Kanevski and Stephan Zahmanov. Her best-known recording was made in the late 1960s by the American explorer of Bulgarian folklore Martin Koening and was released on vinyl in the United States. A few years later, a specimen of the record accidentally fell among the purchased records for the preparation of the Golden Record, a message from the Earth to fly out of the Solar System aboard two identical spacecraft from the NASA Voyager program. The song was included in the final 90-minute musical selection by Carl Sagan and flew first on the Voyager 2, which was launched on August 20, 1977, and two weeks later on September 5, 1977, on the Voyager 1. On August 25, 2012, Voyager 1 became the first object of human origin to leave the Heliosphere and to enter Interstellar medium.

== Accolades ==
In 2002, Balkanska was awarded the Stara Planina Orden (the highest Bulgarian award). She was honoured with her own star plate on the Bulgarian Walk of Fame in Sofia in December 2005.
