= Izlel ye Delyo Haydutin =

Bulgarian folk song

"Izlel ye Delyo Haydutin" (Bulgarian: Излел е Дельо хайдутин, lit. 'Delyo has become a hajduk') is a Bulgarian folk song from the central Rhodope Mountains about Delyo, a rebel leader who was active in the late seventeenth and early eighteenth centuries. The song is most famously sung by Valya Balkanska, a 1970 recording of which was included on the Golden Record carried on board the Voyager 1 and Voyager 2 probes.

== Other versions ==
The first versions of the song were recorded by Georgi Chilingirov and Nadezhda Hvoyneva. Recordings of Valya Balkanska singing it were first made by the American scholar of Bulgarian folklore Martin Koenig in the late 1960s, along with other original Bulgarian folk songs.

An instrumental arrangement appears on Wendy Carlos' album Beauty in the Beast as "A Woman's Song," with synthesized Indian and Western instrumentation in place of Bulgarian bagpipes.

Upon winning the first season of the Bulgarian television series Music Idol in 2007, singer Nevena Tsoneva sang the song with live bagpipe accompaniment for the show’s post-win finale.

== Lyrics ==
Lyrics of Izlel ye Delyo Haydutin, transliterated and translated
Излел е Дельо Xайдутин (Bulgarian Cyrillic)	Izlel ye Delyo Haydutin (Transliteration)	Delyo the Hayduk has Gone Outside (English translation)	Came out rebel Delyo (Alternative English translation)
Излел е Дельо хайдутин, Хайдутин ян кесаджие, С Думбовци и с Караджовци. Заръчал Дельо, порочал, Дериданскине айене, Айене кабадайе, —В селоно имам две лели, Да ми ги не потурчите, Да ми ги не почърните. Че га си слезам в селоно, Мночко щат майки да плакнат, По-мночко, млади нивести. Гюлсуме Дельо зароча: -Чувай са, Дельо, варди са, че ти са канят, Дельо льо, Деридескимнем айене, айене и кабадане, леят ти куршум сребърен, за тебе, Дельо, да превият. -Гюлсуме, любе, Гюлсуме, не са е родил чилюкън дену ще Дельо убие!	Izlel ye Delyo haydutin, Haydutin yan kesadžie, S Dumbovtsi i s Karadzhovtsi. Zaračal Delyo, poročal, Deridanskine ayene, Ayene kabadaye, —V selono imam dve leli, Da mi gi ne poturčite, Da mi gi ne počarnite. Če ga si slezam v selono, Mnočko štat mayki da plaknat, Po-mnočko, mladi nivestni.	Delyo has become hayduk, the hayduk, the rebel with the Dumbovi and the Karadjovi clans. Delyo gave the following orders to the ayans (local notables) of Zlatograd, to the brazen-faced governors: There are two aunts of mine in the village.; Do not make them Turks (= convert them to Islam), do not besmirch them, because when I come back a lot of mothers will cry, a lot of young brides. Gyulsume told Delyo: Beware, Delyo, beware, you are being threatened, Delyo the Zlatograd rulers, the brazen-faced governors, they cast a silver bullet for you, Delyo, to kill you.: Gyulsume, my love Gyulsume, not yet is born a man who could kill me.	Came out rebel Delyo; rebel true grit; with fellow Dumbovtsi and Karadjovtsi; asking Delyo warning; the oppressors and the tyrants; I have two aunts in the village; don't you dare convert them; don't you dare convert them; don't make me come for you; your mothers will mourn you; and more so your wives Gulsum cautions; Listen Delyo, be wary; for they collude, Delyo; the oppressors and the tyrants; casting silver bullet for your demise; Gulsum, my love; Delyo's match hasn't walked the earth yet;
