= Culture of Serbia =

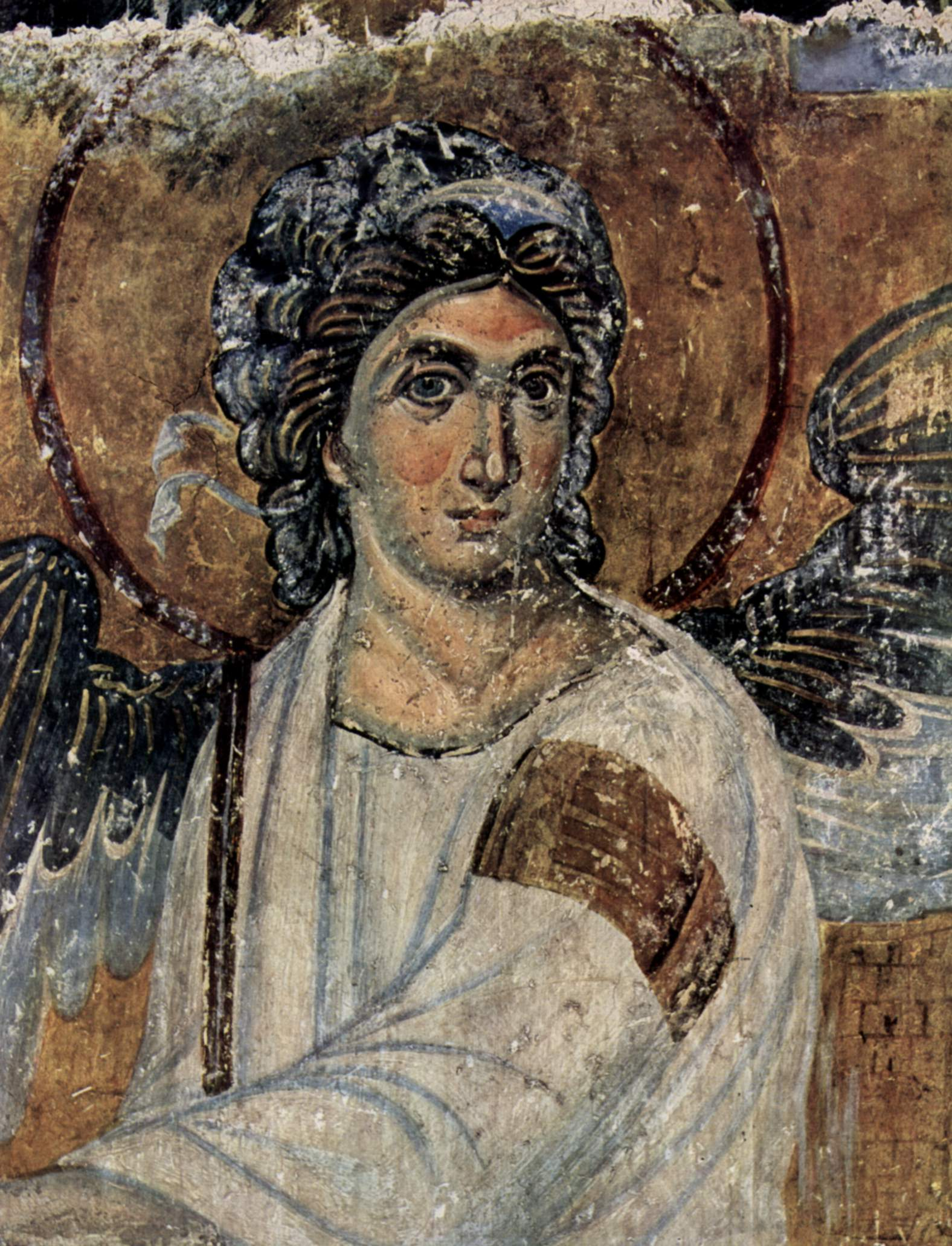
The White Angel fresco from Mileševa monastery; sent as a message in the first satellite broadcast signal from Europe to America, as a symbol of peace and civilization

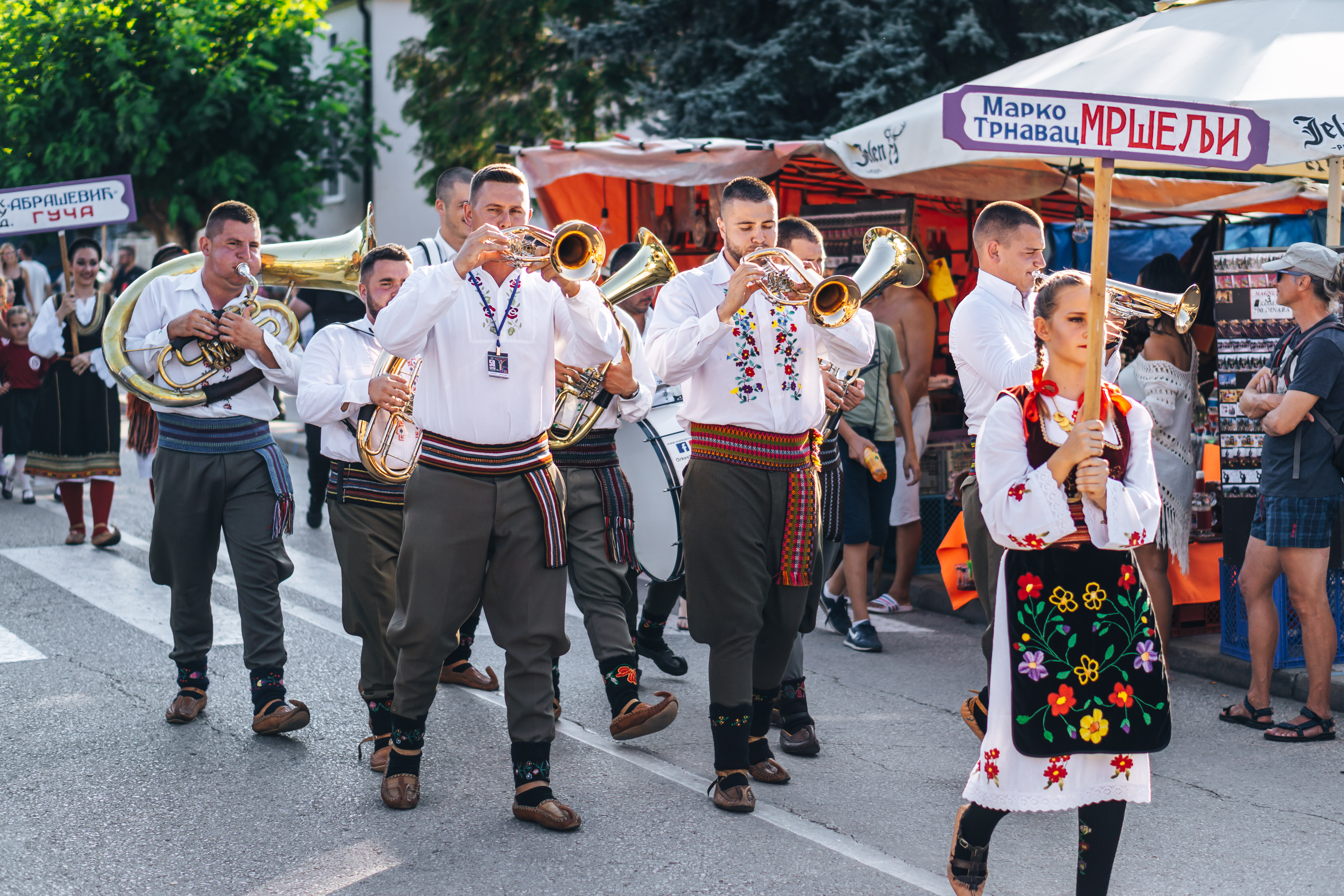
Guča Trumpet Festival, also known as Dragačevski Sabor, in western Serbia

Serbian culture is a term that encompasses the artistic, culinary, literary, musical, political and social elements that are representative of Serbs and Serbia.

== History ==
The Byzantine Empire had a great influence on Serbian culture as it initially governed the Byzantine and Frankish frontiers in the name of the emperors. Serbs soon formed an independent country. They were baptised by Eastern Orthodox missionaries and adopted the Cyrillic script, with both Latin and Catholic influences in the southern regions. The Republic of Venice influenced the maritime regions of the Serbian state in the Middle Ages. The Serbian Orthodox Church gained autocephaly from Constantinople in 1219. The pope declared Stefan the First Crowned king, starting a prosperous medieval period of Serbian culture. The Ottoman Empire conquered the Serbian Despotate in 1459, ending a cultural and political renaissance. Ottomans ruled the territory and influenced Serbian culture, especially in the southern regions. Meanwhile, in the northern regions, the Habsburg monarchy expanded into modern-day Serbian territory beginning at the end of the 17th century, culturally binding this part of the nation to Central Europe, rather than the Balkans. After the Serbian Revolution led to autonomy and eventual independence, its people became the primary influence on the culture of Serbia.

== Religion ==
Conversion of the South Slavs from Slavic paganism to Christianity began in the early 7th century, long before the Great Schism, the split between the Greek Orthodox East and the Roman Catholic West. The Serbs were first Christianised during the reign of Heraclius (610–641). They were fully Christianised by Eastern Orthodox Missionaries (Saints) Cyril and Methodius in 869 during the reign of Basil I, who sent them following Knez Mutimir's acknowledgement of the suzerainty of the Byzantine Empire.

After the Schism, those who lived under the Byzantine sphere of influence became Orthodox; those who lived under the Roman sphere of influence became Catholic. During Stefan Nemanjić's reign (1169–1196), Serbian principalities were united into a Kingdom and many churches and monasteries were built throughout the territories, including the Studenica Monastery. Stefan Nemanja's youngest son, Saint Sava (born as Rastko) was an influential Serbian monk who became the first independent Serbian Archbishop in 1219, granted by the Ecumenical Patriarchate of Constantinople.

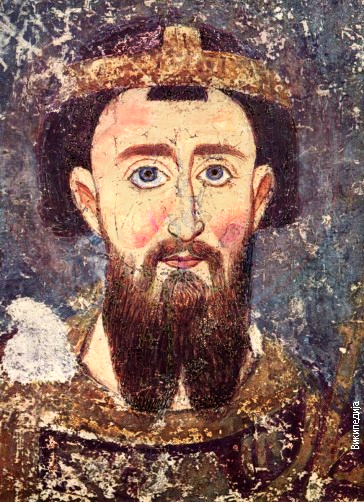
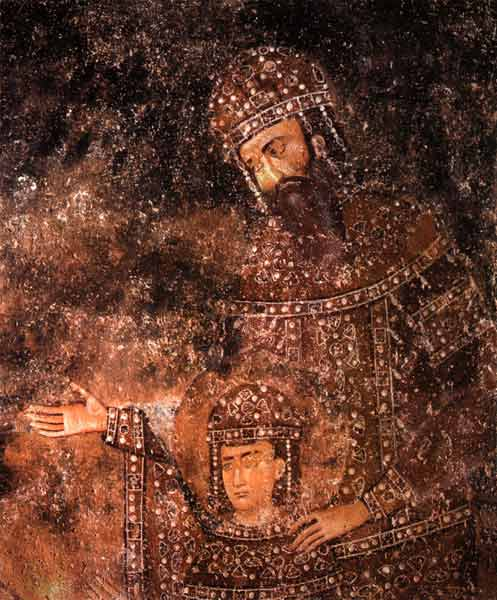
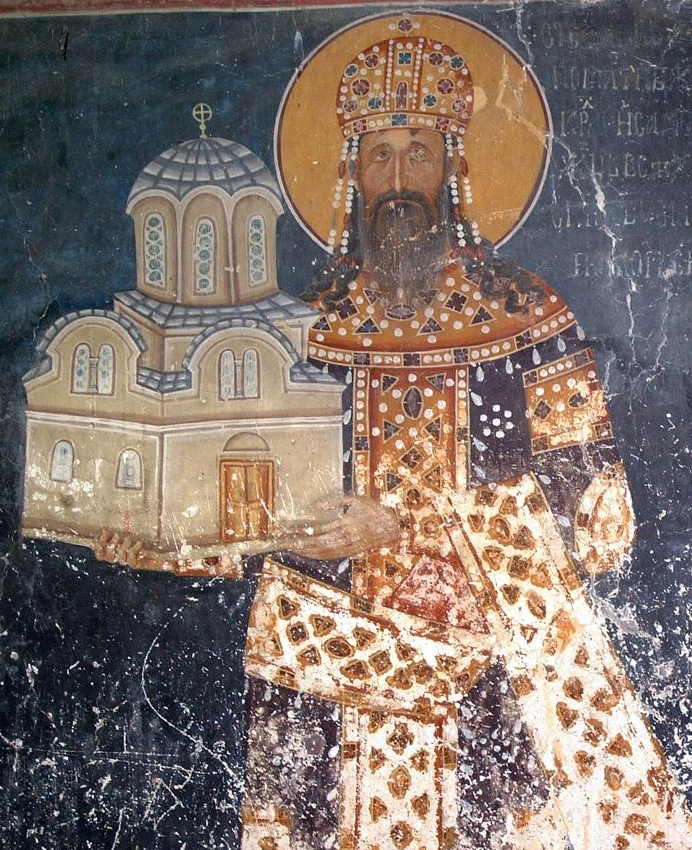
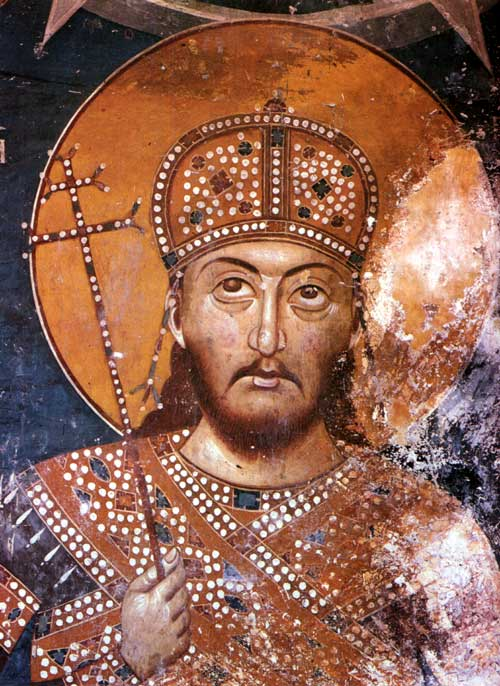
Noted Nemanjic monarchs (clockwise from top left): Stefan Nemanjić, Uroš the Great, Stefan Dušan, Stefan Milutin

The Nemanjić dynasty played a pivotal role in the spread of Eastern Orthodoxy throughout the Balkans. As key patrons of the Serbian Orthodox Church, the Nemanjić rulers were instrumental in the construction and endowment of numerous monastic complexes, thereby reinforcing both religious and cultural identity in medieval Serbia as well as literacy and high education. Their commitment to Orthodoxy significantly contributed to their status as one of the most influential dynasties in Serbian history.

The architectural and cultural legacy of the Nemanjić period is evident in the extensive network of monasteries that continue to serve as vital historical and religious landmarks. Notable examples include UNESCO World heritage sites like Studenica Monastery, Gračanica Monastery, Hilandar Monastery, Đurđevi Stupovi, Sopoćani Monastery, Visoki Dečani Monastery, Patriarchate of Peć and Our Lady of Ljeviš.

Other notable monasteries include Žiča Monastery, Banjska Monastery, Mileševa Monastery, Gradac Monastery, Morača Monastery, Monastery of the Holy Archangels, Matejče Monastery, Church of St. Achillius and many others.

Later, with the arrival of the Ottoman Empire, one group of Serbs converted to Islam. Their modern descendants are considered to be members of the Gorani and Bosniak ethnic groups. The Serbian Orthodox Church was the westernmost bastion of Eastern Orthodox Christianity in Europe, which shaped its historical fate through contacts with Catholicism and Islam.

During World War II the Serbs, who lived in a wide area, were persecuted by various peoples and organisations. Catholic Croats within the Independent State of Croatia recognised the Serbs only as "Croats of the Eastern Greek faith". They held the ideological view that one third of the Serbs were to be murdered, one third were to be converted and the last third expelled. This view led to the deaths of at least 700,000 people, the religious conversion of 250,000 as well as mass expulsion.

According to the 2011 Serbian census, 6,079,396 people (84.6%) identified themselves as Christian Orthodox, five per cent Roman Catholic, three per cent Muslim and one per cent Protestant.

== Names ==
=== Given names ===
As with most Western cultures, a child is given a first name chosen by their parents but approved by the child's godparents who usually approve their choice). The given name comes first, the surname last, e.g. "Željko Popović", where "Željko" is a first name and "Popović" is a family name. Female names typically end with -a or -ica.

Popular names are mostly of Serbian (Slavic), Christian (Biblical), Greek and Latin origin. Some examples are:

- Serbian: Dragana, Dušan, Milan, Milica, Miloš, Nemanja, Uroš, Vuk
- Greek: Aleksandar, Anastasija, Anđela, Đorđe, Jelena, Katarina, Nikola, Stefan
- Biblical: Ana, Lazar, Luka, Jovan or Ivan, Marija, Marko, Matija, Mihajlo, Pavle, Petar
- Latin: Antonije, Roman, Srđan, Valentina

=== Surnames ===
Most Serbian surnames (like Bosnian, Croatian and Montenegrin) have the surname suffix -ić (pronounced [t͡ɕ], Cyrillic: -ић). This is often transliterated as -ic or -ici. In history, Serbian names have often been transcribed with a phonetic ending, -ich or -itch. This form is often associated with Serbs from before the early 20th century: hence Milutin Milanković is usually referred to, for historical reasons, as Milutin Milankovitch.

The -ić suffix, with variants "-ović"/"-ević", is originally a Slavic diminutive and its meaning has been extended to create patronymics. Thus the surname Petr(ov)ić signifies "little Petar", as does, for example, "-sen"/"-son" in Scandinavian and to a lesser extent German and English names or a common prefix Mac ("son of") in Scottish and Irish, and O' (grandson of) in Irish names. It is estimated that some two thirds of all Serbian surnames end in -ić but that some 80% of Serbs carry such a surname with many common names being spread out among tens and even hundreds of non-related extended families.

Other common surname suffixes are -ov or -in which is the Slavic possessive case suffix, thus Nikola's son becomes Nikolin, Petar's son Petrov, and Jovan's son Jovanov. Those are more typical for Serbs from Vojvodina. The two suffixes are often combined. The most common surnames are Marković, Nikolić, Petrović, and Jovanović.

== Cuisine ==
Most people in Serbia have three meals daily, breakfast, lunch and dinner, with lunch being the largest and most important meal. However, people traditionally ate only lunch and dinner, with breakfast being introduced in the second half of the 19th century.

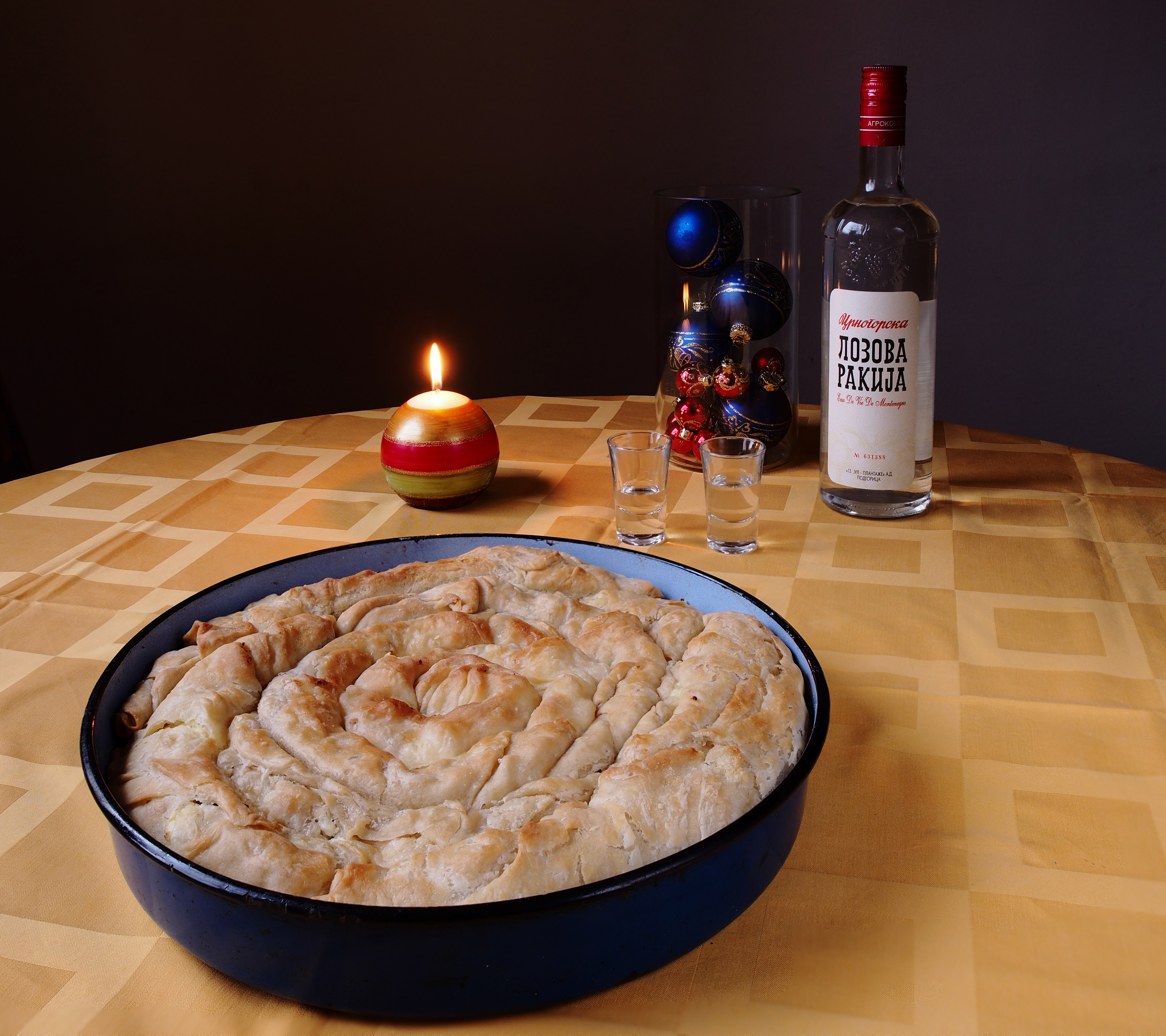
Rolled pie (or rolled burek) served with the national drink rakia

=== Background ===
Traditional Serbian cuisine is varied and can be said to be a mix of European, Mediterranean and Middle Eastern fare. Ćevapi consisting of grilled heavily seasoned mixed ground meat patties is considered the national dish. Other notable dishes include koljivo used in religious rituals, Serbian salad, sarma (stuffed wineleaf), pilav (pilaf, a Middle eastern meal similar to rizzoto), moussaka and bean soup (prebranac). Česnica is a traditional bread for Christmas Day.

=== Homemade meals ===
A number of foods which are easily available in Western supermarkets, are often made at home in Serbia. These include rakija (fruit brandy), slatko, jam, jelly, and pickled foods (notably sauerkraut, ajvar and sausage). There can be economic or cultural reasons behind these food choices. Food preparation is a strong part of the Serbian family tradition.

=== Desserts ===
Serbian desserts are a mixture of other Balkan desserts and desserts native to central Serbia. The desserts that are usually served include uštipci, tulumbe, krofne and palačinke (crepes). Slatko is a traditional Serbian dessert popular throughout Serbia and it can be found in most Serbian restaurants in the Balkans and in the diaspora.

=== Drinks ===
Beer is widely consumed in Serbia. The most popular brands are Jelen Pivo and Lav Pivo. Rakija, a type of fruit brandy is also widespread, with the plum rakija (šljivovica, symbol of Šumadija), and grape rakija (loza, southern Serbia). This is Serbia's national drink and is common in other Mediterranean countries. Domestic wine is also popular. Turkish coffee (called domaća or srpska kafa) is widely consumed as well.

== Language ==
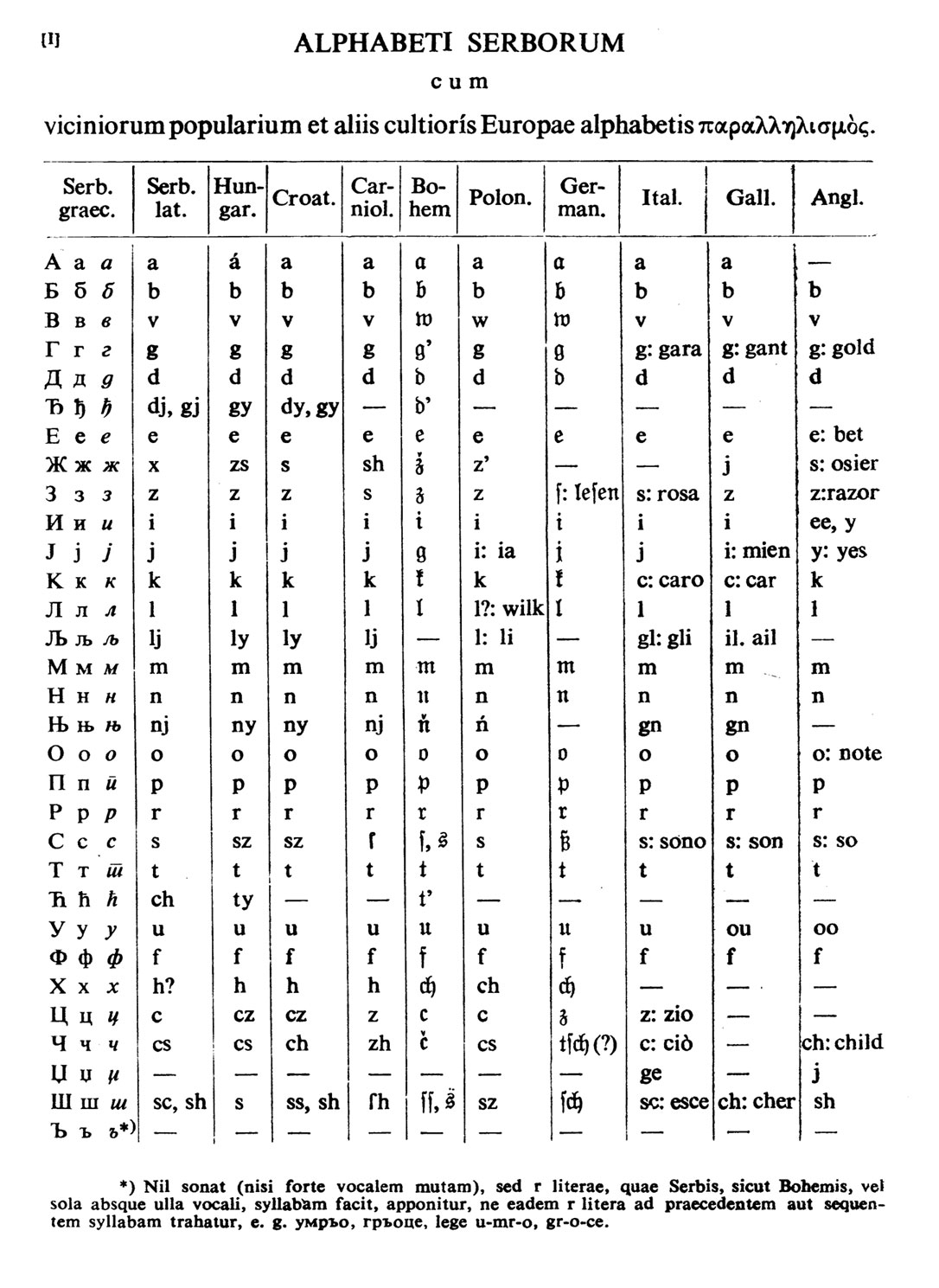
Serbian is the only European language with active digraphia, using both Cyrillic and Latin alphabets. On the picture: Vuk Stefanović Karadžić's Serbian folk poems, 1841

Serbs speak the Serbian language, one of the South Slavic group of languages, specifically in the Southwestern Slavic subgroup together with other Serbo-Croatian varieties and Slovenian. It is mutually intelligible with the Croatian and Bosnian languages (see Differences in standard Serbian, Croatian and Bosnian) and most linguists consider it one of the standard varieties of the common Serbo-Croatian language.

The Serbian language comprises several dialects, the standard language is based on the Stokavian dialect.

It is an official language in Serbia, Bosnia and Herzegovina and Montenegro. In Hungary, Slovakia, Croatia, North Macedonia and Romania, it is a regionally recognised minority language.

There are also historical variants of the Serbian language, namely Old Serbian and Slavonic-Serbian, a blend of Church Slavonic, Russian and Serbian.

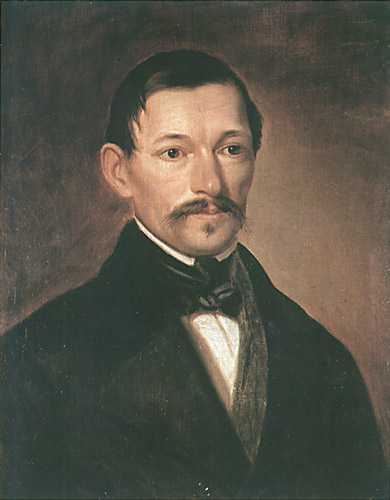
Jovan Sterija Popović, a major dramatist, writer and the founder of several institutions of culture, such as the National Museum of Serbia

Serbian is the only European language with active digraphia, using both Cyrillic and Latin alphabets. The Serbian Cyrillic alphabet was devised in 1814 by Vuk Karadžić, who created the alphabet on phonemic principles. Cyrillic has its origins in the Cyril and Methodius transformation from the Greek script. The Latin alphabet used for Serbian is Ljudevit Gaj's version shared by all Southwestern Slavic languages.

Loanwords in the Serbian language are mostly from Turkish, German and Italian; words of Hungarian origin are present mostly in the north and Greek words mostly in the liturgy.

Two Serbian words that are used in many of the world's languages are vampire and paprika. Slivovitz and ćevapčići are Serbian words which have spread together with the Serbian food/drink they refer to. Vampire entered most West European languages through German-language texts in the early 18th century and has since spread around the world.

== Literature ==
Most Medieval literature was about religious themes. Various gospels, psalters, menologies, hagiographies, and essays and sermons of the founders of the Serbian Orthodox Church were written. At the end of the 12th century, two of the most important pieces of Serbian medieval literature were created—the Miroslav Gospels (UNESCO's Memory of the World) and the Vukan Gospels, which combined handwritten Biblical texts with painted initials and small pictures. Serbian epic poetry was a central part of medieval Serbian literature based on historic events such as the Battle of Kosovo.

Notable Baroque authors include Andrija Zmajević, Gavril Stefanović Venclović, Jovan Rajić and Zaharije Orfelin. Dositej Obradović is the most prominent literary figure of the Age of Enlightenment, while the most notable Classicist writer is Jovan Sterija Popović, although his works also contain elements of Romanticism. Modern Serbian literature began with Vuk Karadžić's collections of folk songs in the 19th century, and the writings of Njegoš and Branko Radičević. The first prominent representative of Serbian literature in the 20th century is Jovan Skerlić, who wrote in pre–World War I Belgrade and helped to introduce Serbian writers to literary modernism.

In the 20th century, Serbian literature flourished and a myriad of young and talented writers appeared. The most well-known authors are Ivo Andrić, Miloš Crnjanski, Meša Selimović, Borislav Pekić, Danilo Kiš, Milorad Pavić, David Albahari, Miodrag Bulatović, Dobrica Ćosić, Zoran Živković among others. Jelena Dimitrijević and Isidora Sekulić are two early 20th century women writers; Svetlana Velmar-Janković was the best-known female novelist in mi-20th and early 21st century. Ivo Andrić won the Nobel Prize in Literature in 1961.

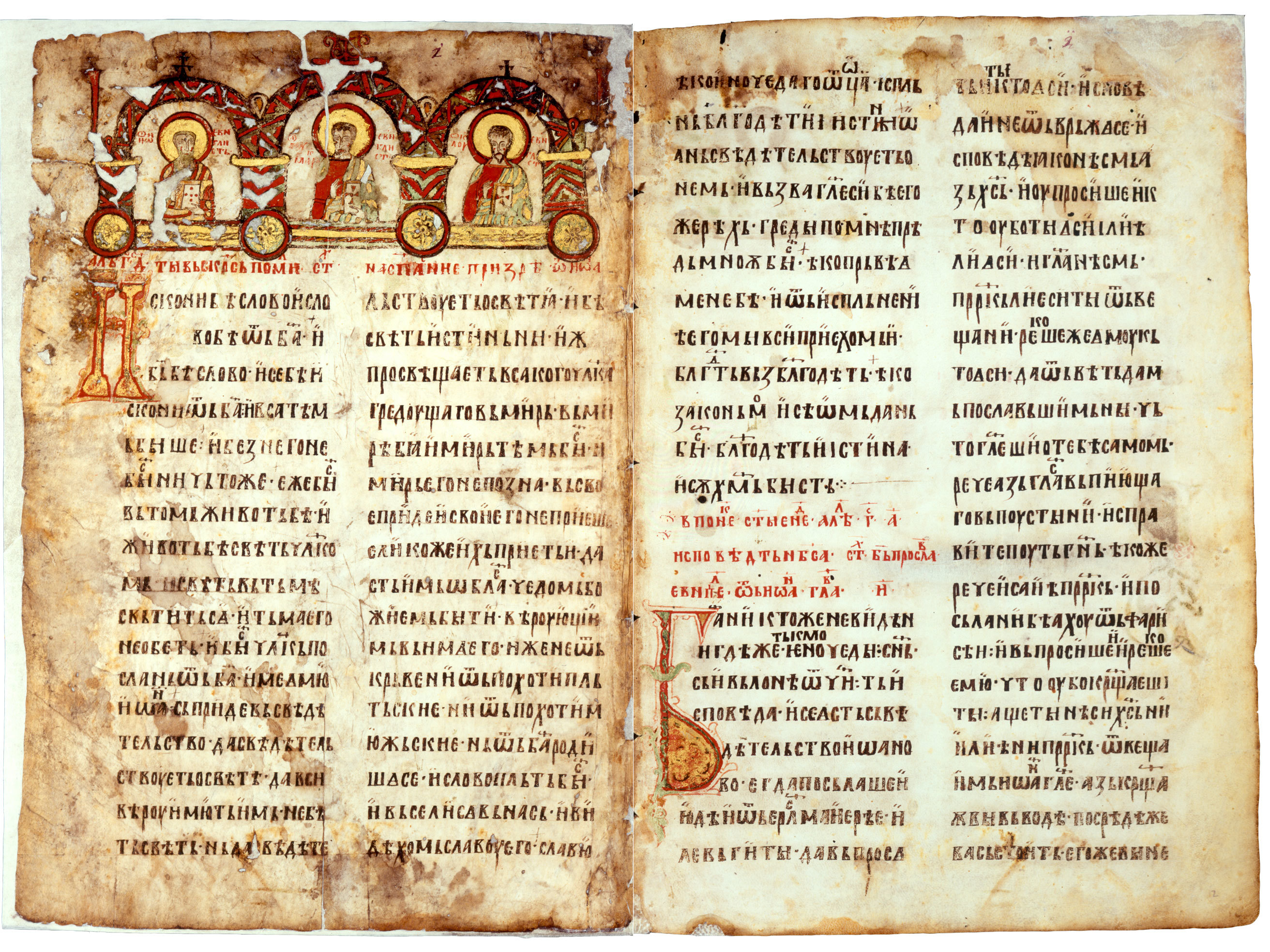
Miroslav's Gospel printed in 1186, UNESCO's Memory of the World Register

Milorad Pavić is one of the most widely acclaimed Serbian authors, most notably for his Dictionary of the Khazars, which has been translated into 38 languages.

== Traditions and customs ==
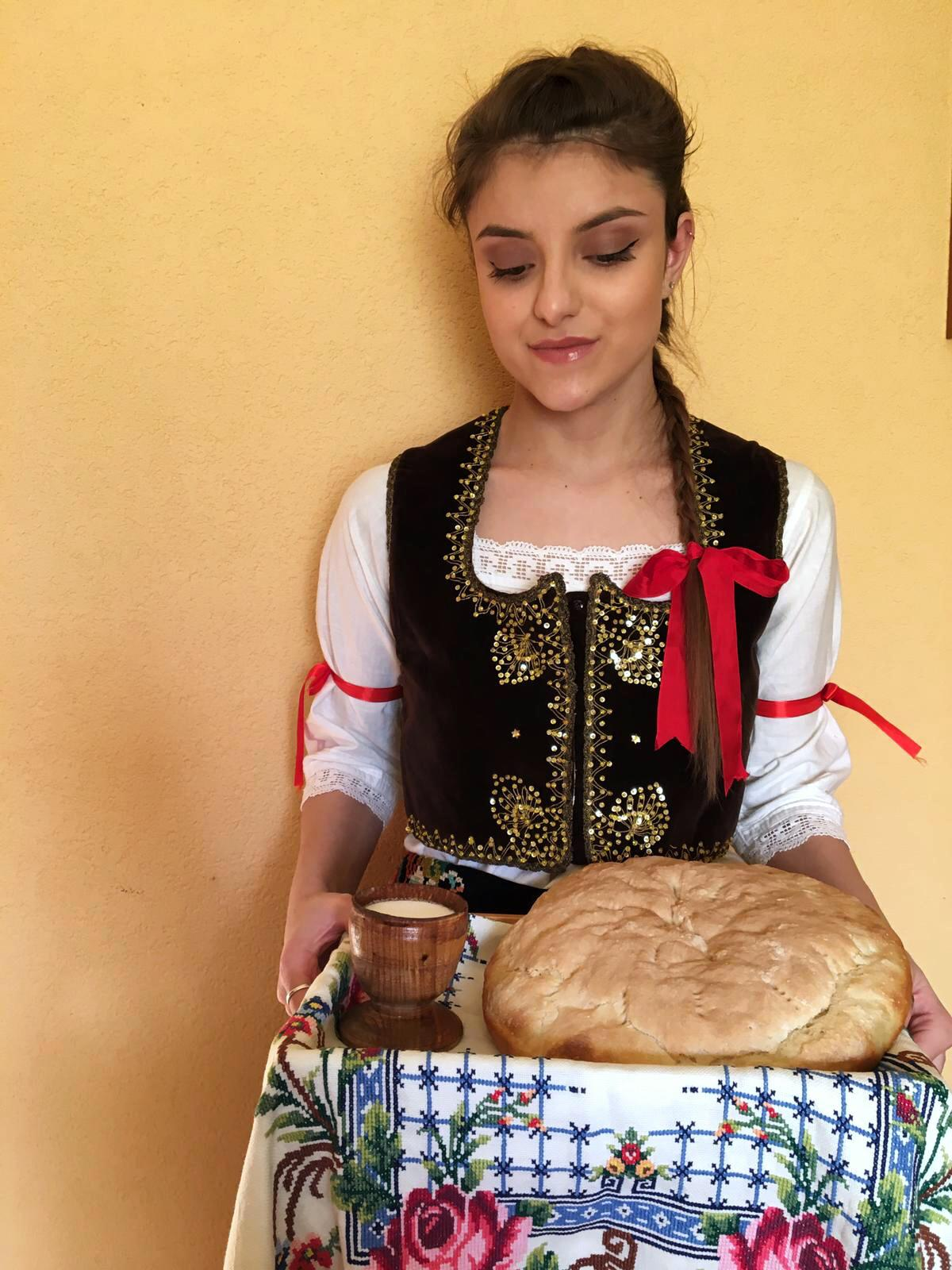
A traditional Serbian welcome of bread and salt

Among Slavs and Orthodox Christians, only Serbs have the custom of slava. Each family has one patron saint they venerate on their feast day. Unlike most customs that are common for everyone, each family celebrates its own saint (of course, there is a lot of overlap) who is considered its protector separately. A slava is passed down mostly, though not exclusively, from father to son. (If a family has no son, and a daughter stays in the parental home and her husband moves in, her slava, not his, is celebrated). Each household celebrates only one saint, so the occasion brings the whole family together. However, since many saints (e.g. St. Nicholas, St. John the Baptist, St. George, St. Archangels of Gabriel and Michael, and the Apostles St. Peter and Paul) have two feast days, both are marked.

- Slava, Serbian Orthodox Patron saint veneration
- Kumstvo, God-parenthood in the Serbian Orthodox Church
- Pobratimstvo, blood-brotherhood
- Serbian Christmas traditions
  - Badnjak (Serbian), Christmas tradition
- Serbian epic poetry, Epic poetry
- Čuvari Hristovog groba is a religious/cultural practice of guarding a representation of Christ's grave on Good Friday in the Church of St. Nicholas by the Serbian Orthodox inhabitants in the town of Vrlika

The Serbs are a highly family-oriented society, which glancing at a Serbian dictionary and the richness of their terminology related to kinship makes clear.

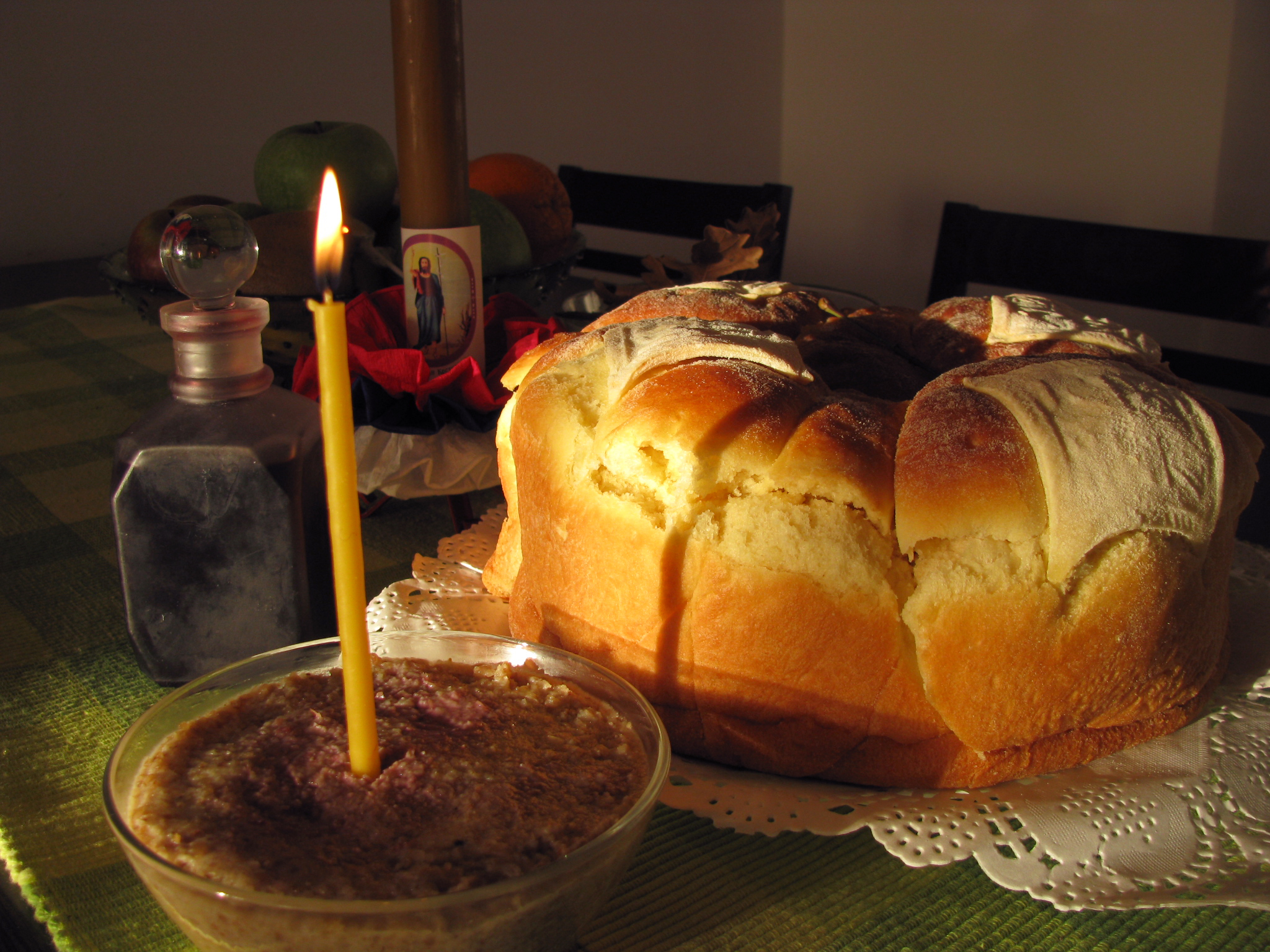
Slava is a family feast prepared in honour of a family's Patron Saint. It was inscribed in UNESCO Intangible Cultural Heritage Lists.

The traditional dance is a circle dance called kolo, which is common among Serbs, Montenegrins and Macedonians. It is a collective dance, where a group of people (usually several dozen, at the very least three) hold each other by the hands or around the waist dancing, forming a circle (hence the name), semicircle or spiral. It is called Oro in Montenegro. Similar circle dances also exist in other cultures of the region.

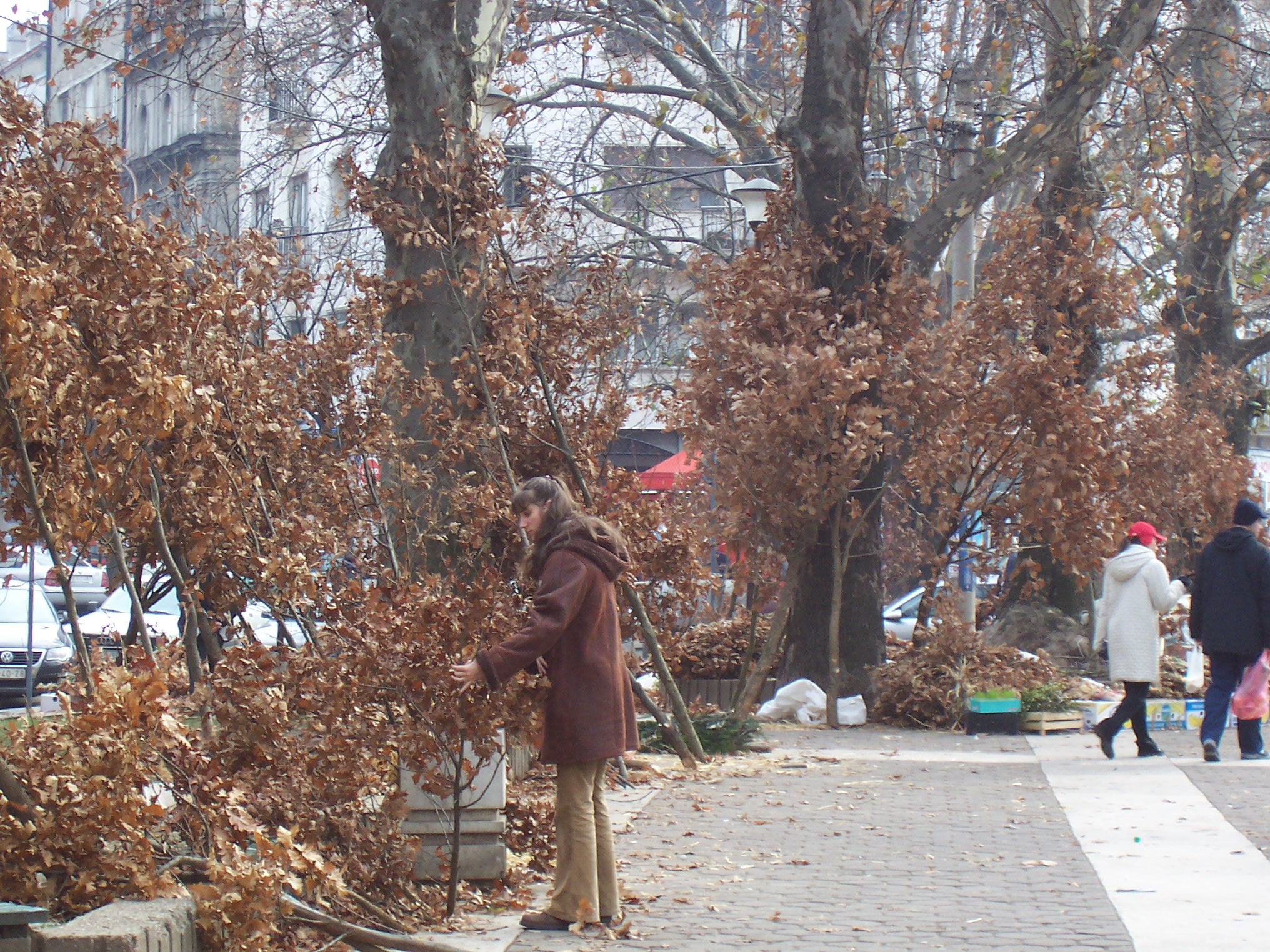
Badnjak is a central tradition in Serbian Christmas celebrations

The Serbian Orthodox Church uses the traditional Julian calendar, so Christmas Day (December 25) falls on January 7 on the Gregorian calendar and is the day Serbs celebrate Christmas. This is shared with the Orthodox churches of Jerusalem, Russia, Georgia, Ukraine and the Greek Old Calendarists.Serbs have their own customs regarding Christmas. Early in the morning of Christmas Eve, the head of the family would go to a forest to cut badnjak, a young oak, the oak tree would then be brought into the church to be blessed by the priest. Then it would be stripped of its branches and combined with wheat and other grain products would be burned in the fireplace. The burning of the badnjak is a ritual which is of pagan origin and is considered a sacrifice to God (or the old pagan gods) so that the coming year may bring plenty of food, happiness, love, luck and riches. Nowadays, with most Serbs living in towns, they go to their church service to be given a small parcel of oak, wheat and other branches tied together to be taken home and set afire. The house floor and church are covered with hay, reminding worshippers of the stable in which Jesus was born.

Christmas Day itself is celebrated with a feast, necessarily featuring roasted piglet as the main meal. The most important Christmas meal is česnica, a special bread. It contains a coin; during the lunch, the family breaks up the bread and the one who finds the coin is said to be assured of an especially happy year.

Unlike in the West, Christmas is not associated with presents, although it is the day of Saint Nicholas, the protector saint of children, to whom presents are given. Most Serbian families give presents on New Year's Day. Santa Claus (Deda Mraz (literally meaning Grandpa Frost)) and the Christmas tree (generally associated with New Year's Day) are also used in Serbia because of globalisation. Serbs celebrate the Old New Year (currently on January 14 of the Gregorian calendar).

On Orthodox Easter, Serbs have the tradition of Slavic Egg decorating.

Another related feature, often lamented by Serbs themselves, is disunity and discord; as Slobodan Naumović puts it, "Disunity and discord have acquired in the Serbian popular imaginary a notorious, quasi-demiurgic status. They are often perceived as being the chief malefactors in Serbian history, causing political or military defeats, and threatening to tear Serbian society completely apart." That disunity is often quoted as the source of Serbian historic tragedies, from the Battle of Kosovo in 1389 to Yugoslav Wars in the 1990s. Even the contemporary notion of "two Serbia's"—one supposedly liberal, pro-European, Eurocentric and pro-western—and the other conservative, nationalist, Russophilic and Eurosceptic seems to be an extension of the discord. Popular proverbs "two Serbs, three political parties" and "God save us from Serbs that may unite!", and even the unofficial Serbian motto "Only Unity Saves the Serbs" (Samo sloga Srbina spasava) illustrates the national frustration with the inability to unite over important issues.

== Humour ==
Serbian has a long tradition of humour and popular jokes. The most common type of humour is black humour and Serbian jokes are often imitated by other peoples from the Balkans, often with a twist. As with many other peoples, there are popular stereotypes at the local level: in popular jokes and stories, northern Serbs of Vojvodina (Lale) are perceived as phlegmatic, undisturbed and slow; Montenegrins are lazy and pushy; people from Pirot are misers; Bosnians are raw and simple; Serbs from Central Serbia (Šumadija) are often portrayed as capricious and malicious, etc.

== Visual arts ==
=== Painting ===
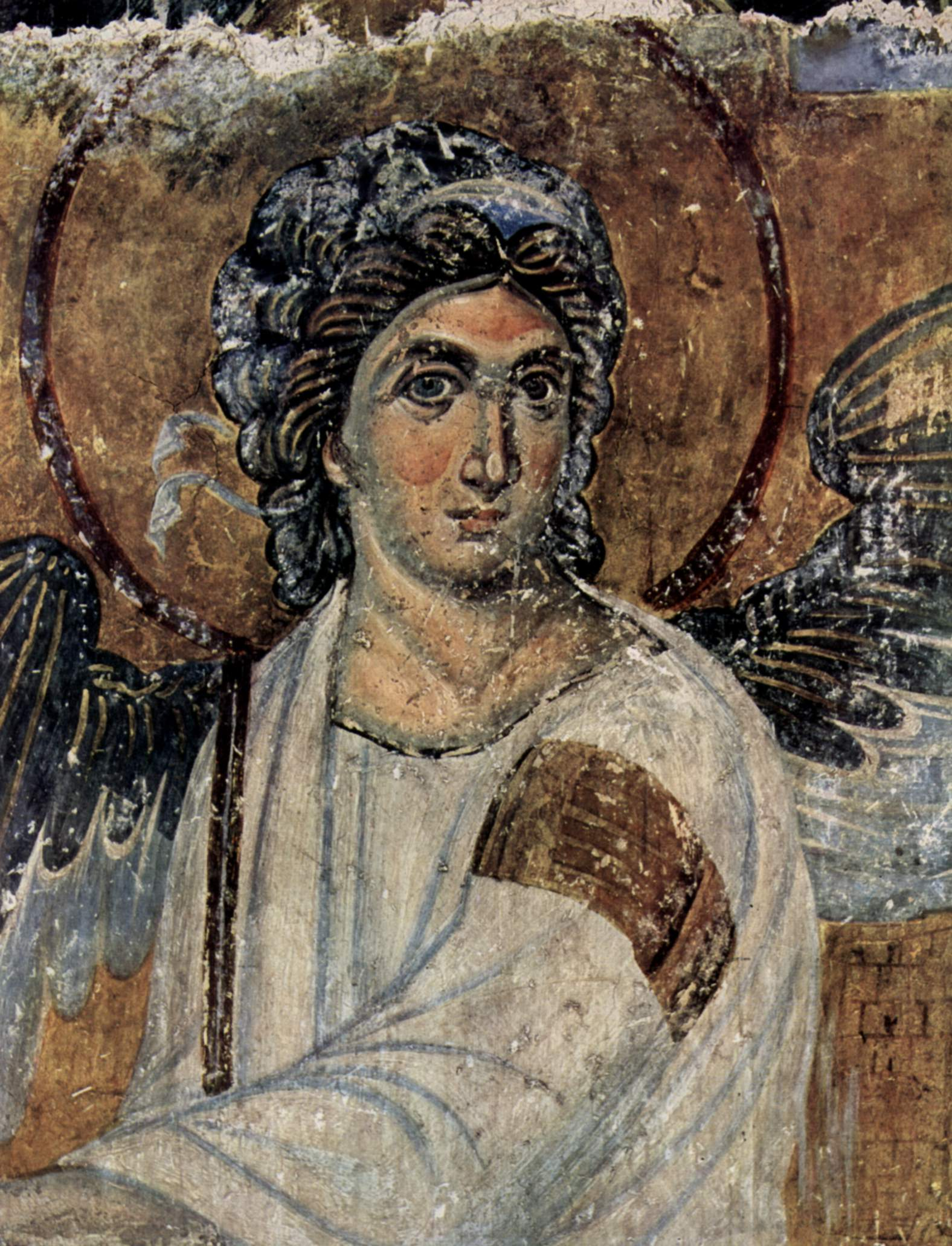
The White Angel fresco from Mileševa monastery

Medieval Serbian painting developed under the patronage of the medieval Serbian state. Churches and monasteries build during this time features significant works of art including Byzantine style fresco paintings. The influence of Byzantine art became more influential after the capture of Constantinople in 1204 in the Fourth Crusade when many Greek artists fled to Serbia. Orthodox fresco painting represents the peak of Serbian medieval art. Its birth went in line with the creation and development of medieval Serbian state, but unlike Serbian state it didn't cease to exist during the Ottoman occupation. While Serbian architecture has seen mixed influences of both Byzantine and medieval Italian states, fresco and icon painting remained deeply rooted in solely eastern byzantine tradition. Frescos were being painted under the patronage of Serbian rulers, as the highest form of religious decorative form. Following the political expansion and military growth, the 13th and 14th century are marked as the period when the biggest amount of newly built or existing sanctuaries have been decorated. The most famous Serbian medieval fresco is the Myrrhbearers (or the "White Angel") from the Mileševa monastery, painted in 1235, on the southern wall of the church. This fresco was sent as a message in the first satellite broadcast signal from Europe to America after the Cuban Missile Crisis, as a symbol of peace and civilization. Later, the same signal, containing the White Angel, was transmitted to space in an attempt to communicate with extraterrestrial life forms.

The Ottoman conquest of Serbia during the 15th century had a negative impact on the visual arts. The Serbian nobility was not integrated into the Ottoman state system, and the Ottoman government abolished the church. As the nobility and church were the main sources of patronage for architects and artists, the early modern period is considered an artistically less productive period in Serbian art. There was some resumption of artistic endeavor after the restoration of the Serbian Patriarchate in 1557. Djordje Mitrofanović was the leading painter of the early 17th century with his work on the church at the Morača Monastery considered as amongst his best.

A Baroque church 'Our Lady of the Rocks' on an island in the Boka Kotorska, in Montenegro is one of the most notable pieces of architecture in Serbia from the early modern period; many fine specimens of silverware dating from the 17th century are contained within its walls. Traditional Serbian art was beginning to show some Baroque influences at the end of the 18th century as shown in the works of Nikola Nešković, Teodor Kračun and Jakov Orfelin.

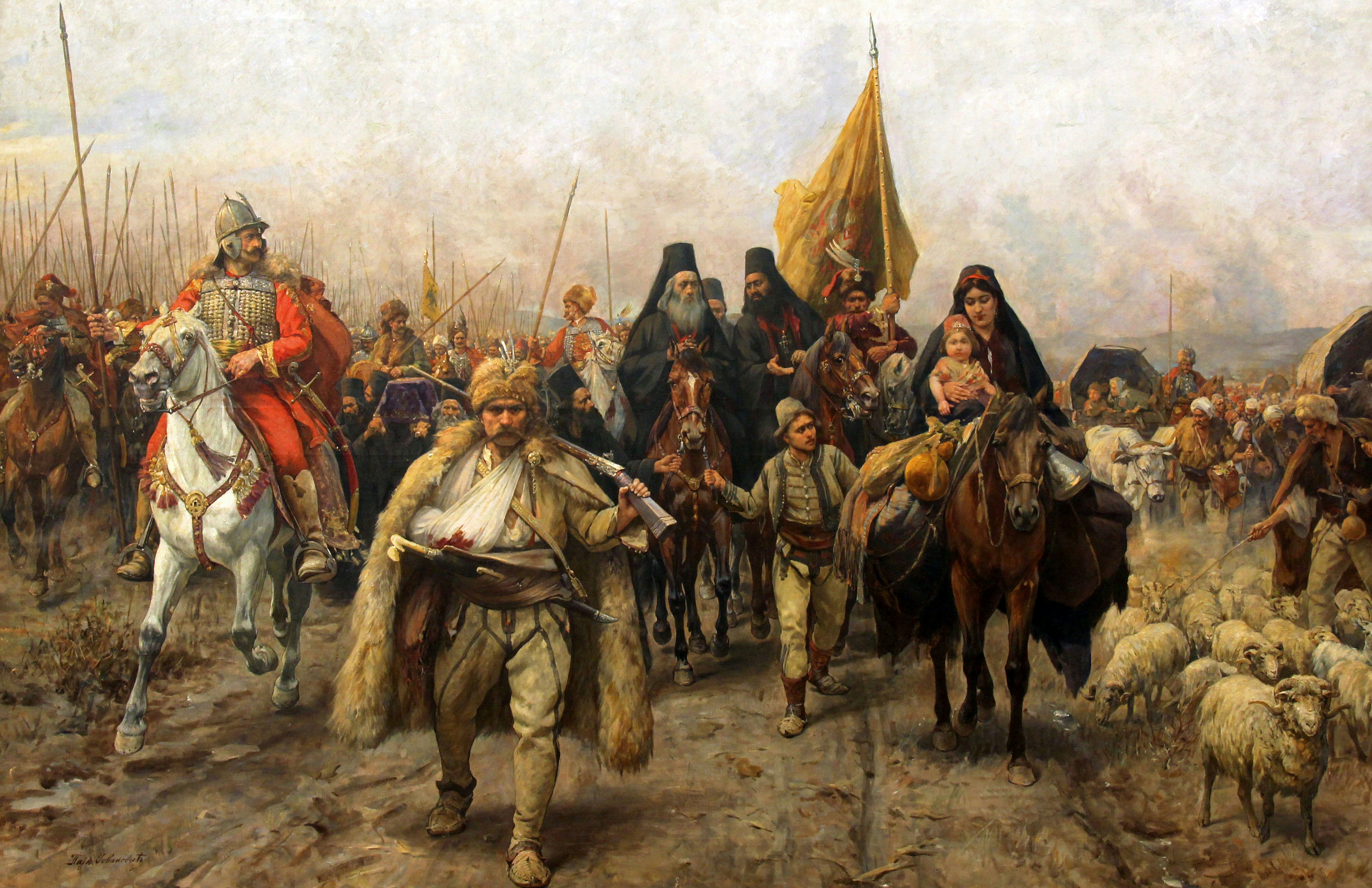
Migration of the Serbs (1896) by Paja Jovanović depicts the Great Serb Migrations, on display in the National Museum of Serbia.

There was a resurgence of art in Serbia in the 19th century as Serbia gradually regained its autonomy. Prince Aleksandar commissioned the building of a Monument to the Insurgents in Karađorđev Park in 1848 in Vračar. Serbian paintings showed the influence of Neoclassicism and Romanticism during the 19th century. Anastas Jovanović was a pioneering photographer in Serbia, taking the photos of many leading citizens.

Kirilo Kutlik set up the first school of art in Serbia in 1895. Many of his students went to study in Western Europe, especially France and Germany, and brought back avant-garde styles. Fauvism influenced Nadežda Petrović, while Sava Šumanović worked in Cubism.

After World War I, the Belgrade School of Painting developed in the capital with some members such as Milan Konjović working in a Fauvist manner, while others such as Marko Čelebonović worked in a style called Intimisme based on the use of colours.

The most famous Serbian painters were Paja Jovanović and Uroš Predić, painting in the Realist style. Their monumental paintings of historical events have inspired generations of Serbian artists.

=== Architecture ===
The architecture of Serbia has a long, rich and diverse history. Some of the major European style from Roman to Postmodern are demonstrated, including renowned examples of Raška, Serbo-Byzantine with its revival, Morava, Baroque, Classical and Modern architecture, with prime examples in Brutalism and Streamline Moderne.

== Performing arts ==
=== Music ===
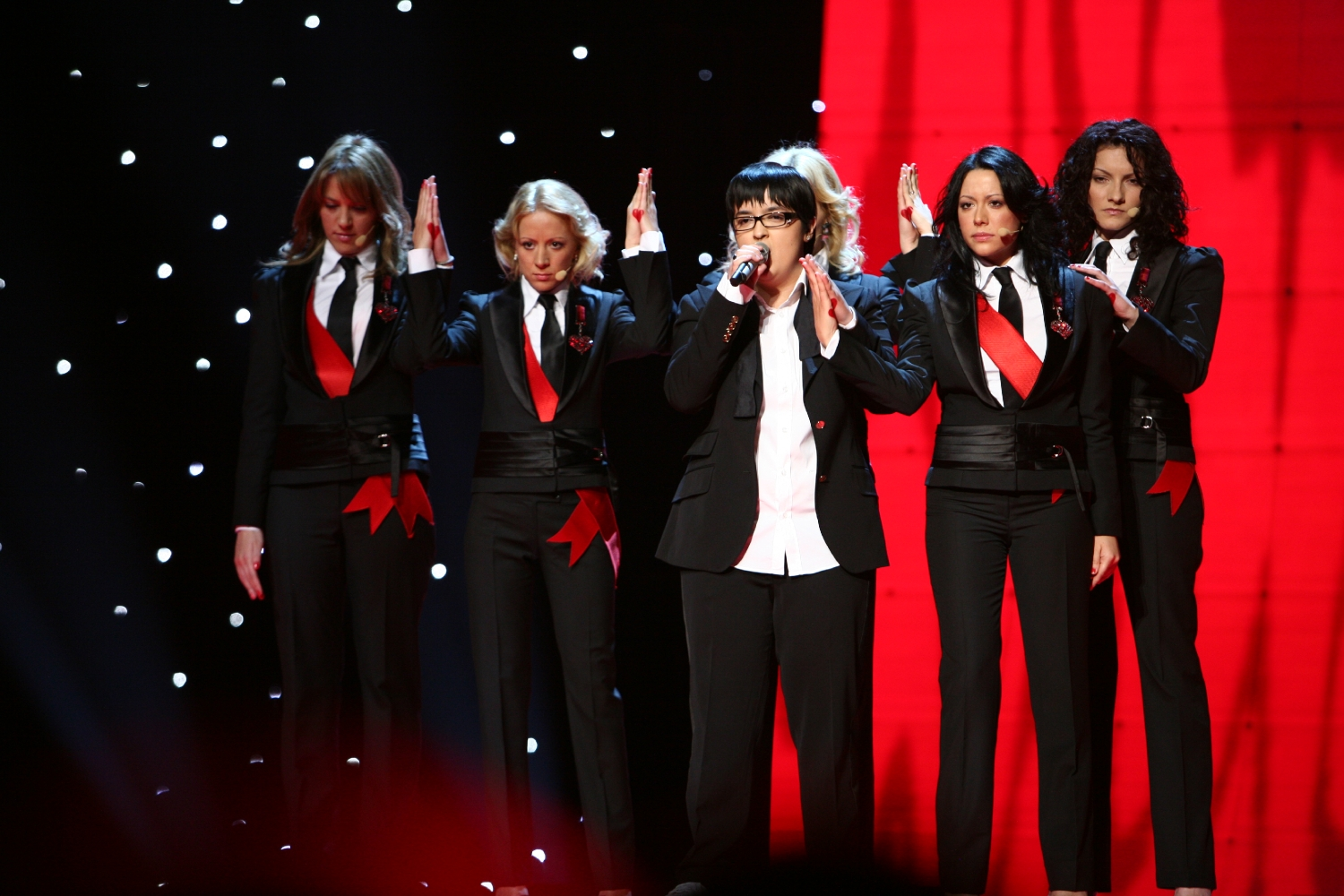
Marija Šerifović won the Eurovision Contest for Serbia in 2007.

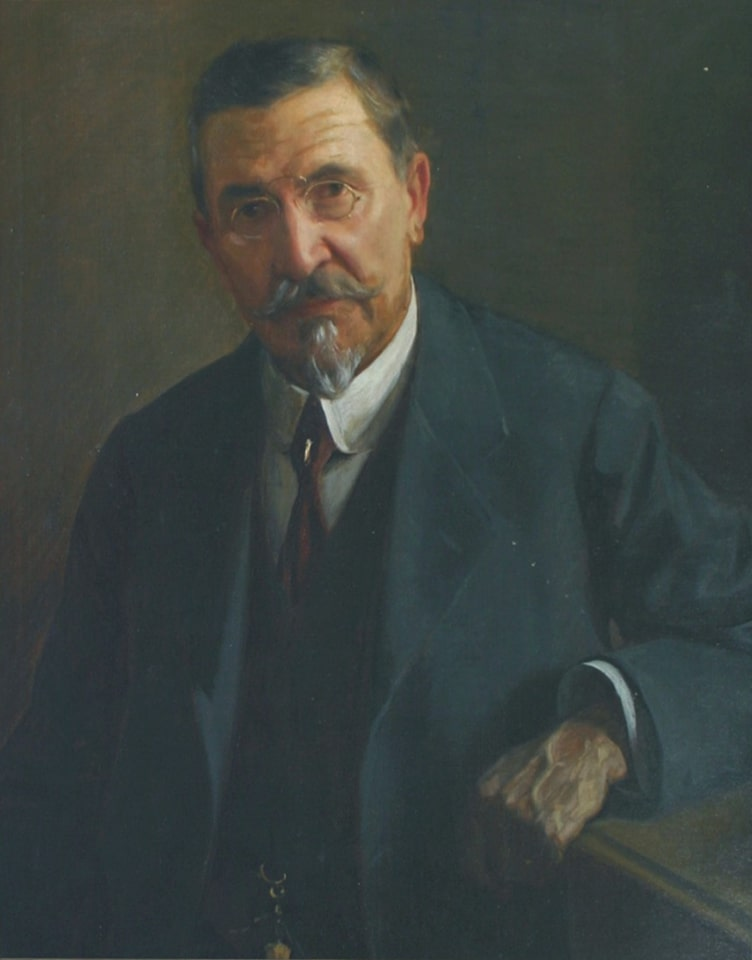
Stevan Stojanović Mokranjac

Serbian music dates from the medieval period with strong church and folk traditions. Church music in Serbia of the time was based on the Osmoglasnik a cycle of religious songs based on the resurrection and lasting for eight weeks. During the Nemanjić dynasty and under other rulers such as Stefan Dušan, musicians enjoyed royal patronage. There was a strong folk tradition in Serbia dating from this time.

During Ottoman rule, Serbs were forbidden to own property, to learn to read and write and denied the use of musical instruments. Church music had to be performed in private. The gusle, a one-stringed instrument, was used by Serbian peasants during this time in an effort to find a loophole through the stringent Ottoman laws. Filip Višnjić was a particularly notable guslar (gusle player). In the 18th century, Russian and Greek chant schools were established and the Serbian Orthodox Church accepted Church Slavonic into their liturgy.

Folk music enjoyed a resurgence in the 19th century. Stevan Mokranjac, a composer and musicologist, collected folk songs as well as performing his own work. Kornelije Stanković wrote the first Serbian language works for choirs.

Traditional Serbian folk music remains popular today, especially in rural areas. Western rock and pop music has become increasingly popular, mainly in cities with rock acts such as Riblja Čorba and Đorđe Balašević incorporating political statements in their music. Turbo-folk combines Western rock and pop styles with traditional folk music vocals. Serbian immigrants have taken their musical traditions to nations such as the US and Canada.

Marija Šerifović won first place at the 2007 Eurovision Song Contest, and Serbia was the host of the 2008 contest.

Several notable composers used motifs from Serbian folk music and composed works inspired by Serbian history or culture, such as Johannes Brahms, Franz Liszt, Arthur Rubinstein, Antonín Dvořák, Pyotr Ilyich Tchaikovsky, Nikolai Rimsky-Korsakov, Franz Schubert, Hans Huber and other.

=== Theatre and cinema ===
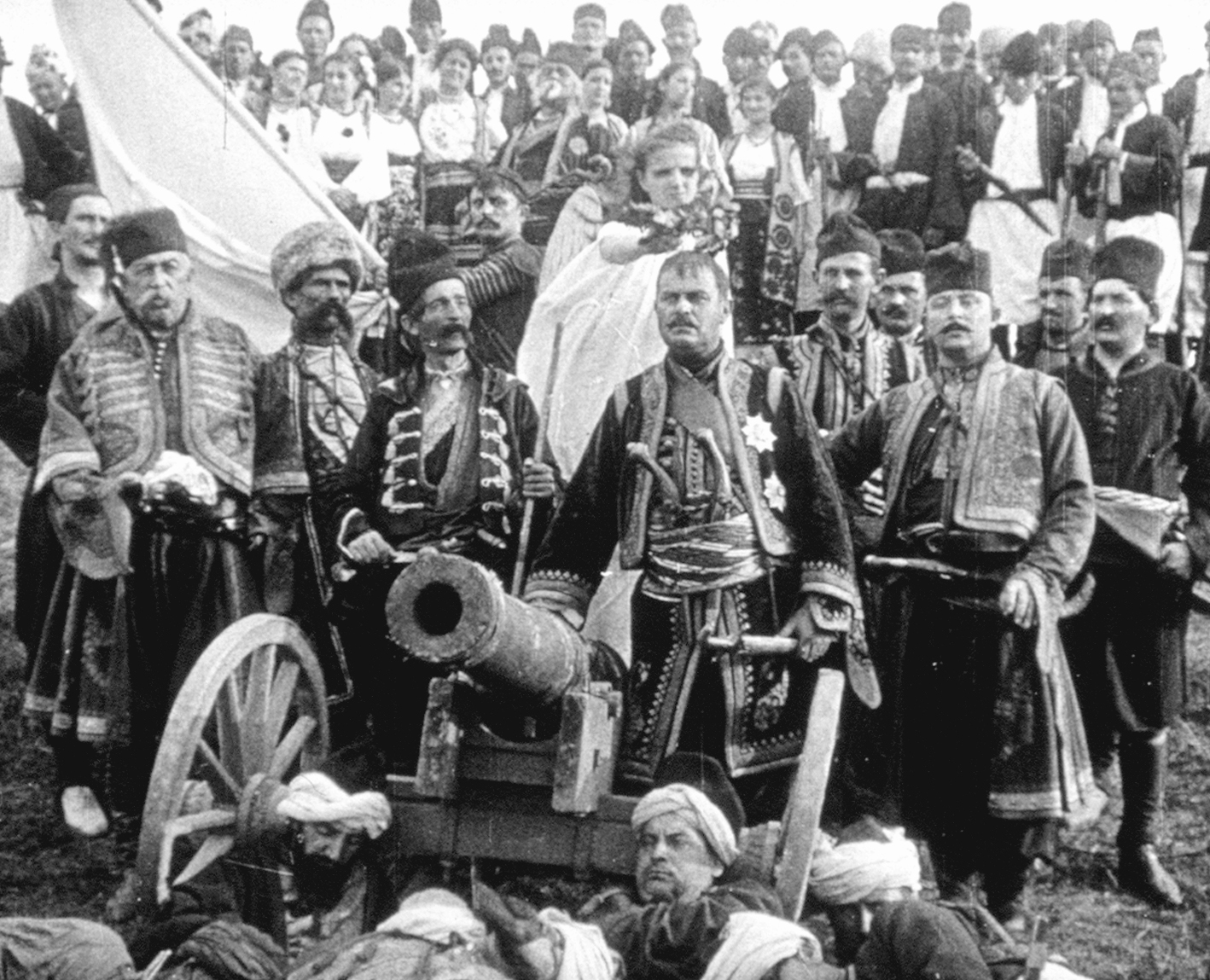
A still from The Life and Deeds of the Immortal Leader Karađorđe, the first feature film released in the Balkans.

Serbia has a well-established theatrical tradition with many theatres. The Serbian National Theatre was established in 1861. The company started performing opera at the end of the 19th century and the permanent opera was established in 1947. It established a ballet company.

Bitef, Belgrade International Theatre Festival, is one of the oldest theatre festivals in the world. New Theatre Tendencies is the constant subtitle of the Festival. Founded in 1967, Bitef has continually followed and supported the latest theater trends. It has become one of the five most important and biggest European festivals, and one of the most significant culture institutions of Serbia.

Cinema was established reasonably early in Serbia, with 12 feature films being produced before the start of World War II. The most notable of the prewar films is Mihailo Popovic's The Battle of Kosovo in 1939.

Cinema prospered after World War II. The most notable postwar director is Dušan Makavejev, who is recognised internationally for Love Affair: Or the Case of the Missing Switchboard Operator in 1969. Makavejev's Montenegro was made in Sweden in 1981. Zoran Radmilović was one of the most notable actors of the postwar period.

Serbian cinema continued to make progress in the 1990s and today, despite the turmoil of the 1990s. Emir Kusturica won two Golden Palms for Best Feature Film at the Cannes Film Festival, for When Father Was Away on Business in 1985 and then again for Underground in 1995. In 1998, Kusturica won a Silver Lion for directing Black Cat, White Cat.

== Serbian handcrafts ==
Serbia has a long tradition of handicrafts. Đakovica in Kosovo was known for its black pottery. Pirot in southern Serbia became known for its ceramics under the Ottomans with the potters following Byzantine designs. It also became a centre for the production of kilims or rugs.

The Slavs introduced jewellery making to Serbia in the 6th century AD. Metalworking started to develop on a significant scale following the development of a Serbian state. Workshops were set up in towns, large estates and in monasteries. The Studenica Monastery was known for the quality of its goldsmithing. Coins were minted not only by the kings but some of the wealthier nobility. The nobility was influenced by the wealth of the Byzantine court. Metalworking like many other arts and crafts went into decline following the Ottoman conquest. However, there was a partial revival in later centuries with a strong Baroque influence notably, the 17th century silverware at Our Lady of the Rocks on Boka Kotorska.

== Science ==
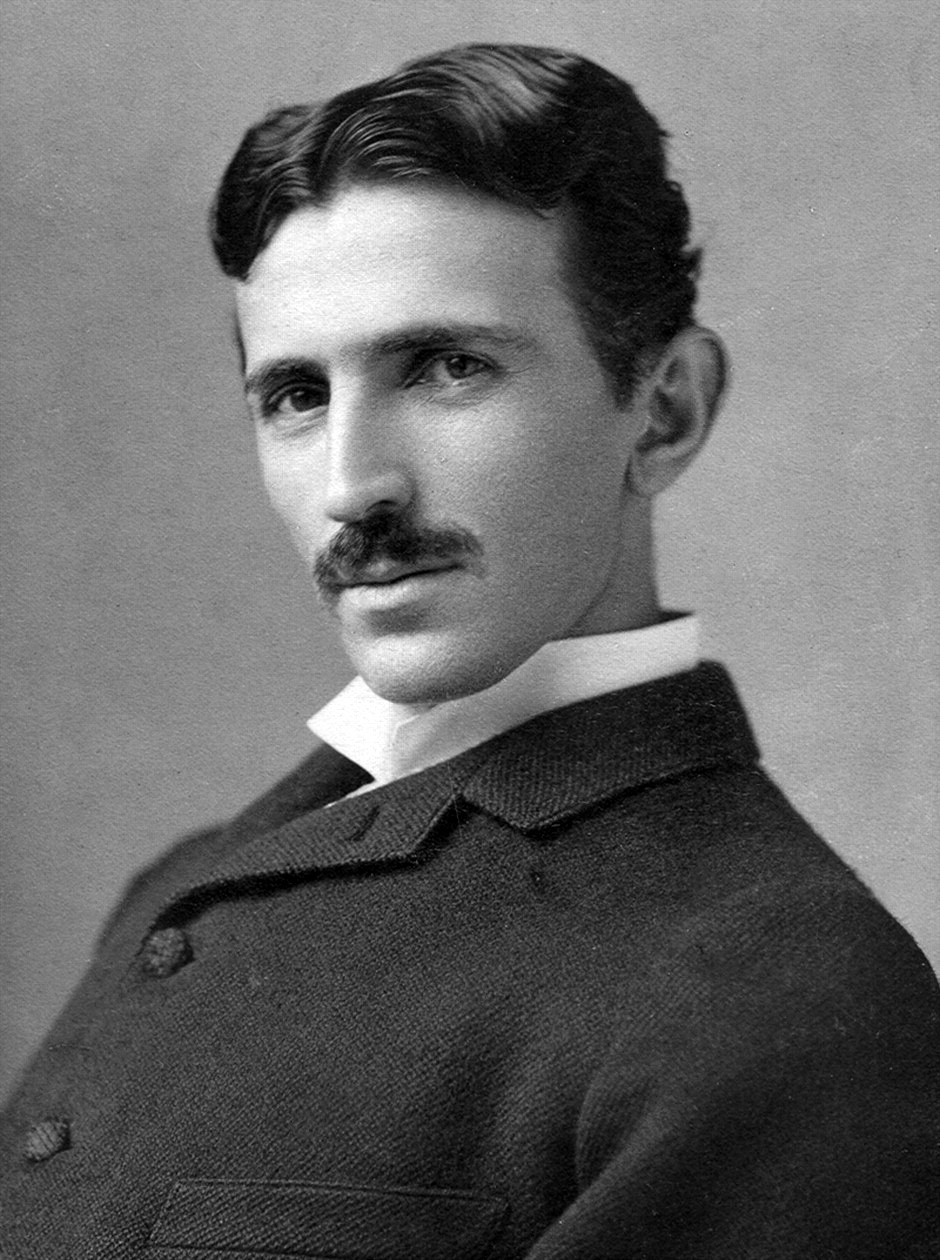
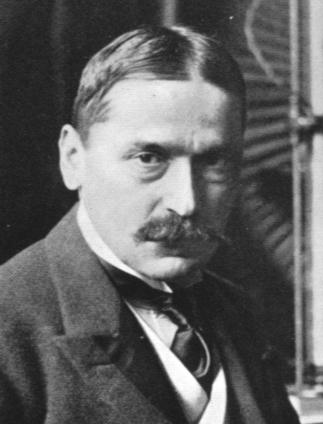
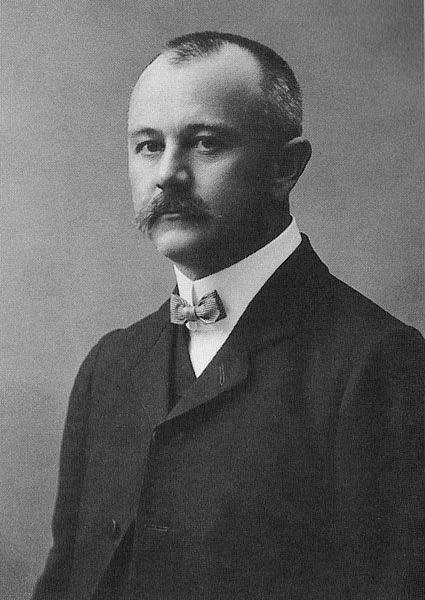
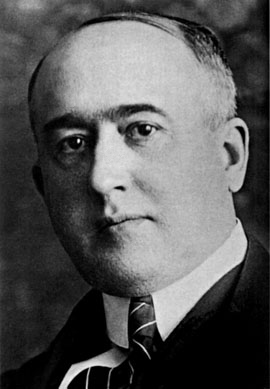
Noted inventors and scientists (clockwise from top left): Nikola Tesla, Mihajlo Pupin, Milutin Milanković, Jovan Cvijić

Serbian American mechanical and electrical engineer Nikola Tesla is widely regarded as one of the greatest inventors in history, celebrated especially for his revolutionary work on alternating current (AC) electricity and magnetism. Physicist and electrical engineer Mihajlo Pupin developed the landmark theory of modern electrical filters and held numerous patents. Astronomer Milutin Milanković formulated the theory of long-term climate change driven by variations in Earth’s orbit and axis, now known as Milankovitch cycles. Roger Joseph Boscovich, a Ragusan physicist, astronomer, mathematician and polymath of paternal Serbian origin, produced a precursor of atomic theory, made many contributions to astronomy and discovered the absence of atmosphere on the Moon. Nuclear physicist Pavle Savić helped lay the groundwork for the discovery of nuclear fission and later led nuclear research efforts in Yugoslavia. Theoretical physicist Mileva Marić, Albert Einstein's first wife, contributed significantly to the early development of the theory of special relativity and other foundational works in modern physics. Physicist and environmental scientist Tihomir Novakov made groundbreaking discoveries about the role of black carbon (soot) in atmospheric aerosols, significantly advancing the understanding of air pollution and its impact on climate change. Chemist Sima Lozanić was among the first promoters of the periodic table of elements, while archaeologist Miloje Vasić became widely recognized after the discovery of the Neolithic site of Vinča culture in 1905 and subsequent excavation, which began in 1908. Jovan Žujović made a decisive contribution to the geological research of the Balkan Peninsula.

Among notable Serbian mathematicians are Mihailo Petrović Alas (who made major contributions to differential equations and phenomenology and built one of the first prototypes of an analog computer), Jovan Karamata (leading figure in mathematical analysis), and Đuro Kurepa (known for his work in set theory and combinatorics).

Geographer Jovan Cvijić founded modern geography in Serbia, conducted pioneering studies of the Balkan Peninsula and advanced karst research. Botanist Josif Pančić discovered numerous plant species, including the endemic Serbian spruce. Biologist and physiologist Ivan Đaja performed research in the role of the adrenal glands in thermoregulation, as well as pioneering work in hypothermia. Teodor Janković Mirijevski was one of the finest education reformers of 18th century Europe.

Biomedical engineer Gordana Vunjak-Novakovic has advanced tissue engineering for regenerative medicine, stem-cell research, and disease modeling. Neuroscientist and sleep researcher Miodrag Radulovački pioneered studies on the neurochemical mechanisms of sleep and wakefulness, particularly the role of adenosine. Economist Branko Milanović is an international expert on income distribution and inequality.

Seven Serbian American engineers and scientists known as "Serbo 7" took part in construction of the Apollo spaceship. The most famous Serbian legal scholars are Slobodan Jovanović and Valtazar Bogišić while a great contribution to the development of critical historiography was made by Ilarion Ruvarac, Stojan Novaković and Vladimir Ćorović.

== Philosophy ==
Dositej Obradović, one of the greatest European enlighteners of the 18th century, writer, educator, and the first Minister of Education of Serbia, is regarded as the first modern Serbian philosopher and a key figure in promoting rationalism.

In the 19th century, the rationalist thinking was continued by the positivist Svetozar Marković, the leading Serbian socialist thinker who criticized utopian socialism and advocated a realist, materially grounded social analysis, though his thought aligned more with Russian populist revolutionary-democracy than with strict Marxist scientific socialism.

The most influential Serbian philosopher of the first half of the 20th century was Branislav Petronijević, a metaphysician and logician who developed an original "monadological" system and pluralistic philosophy that attracted attention from Bertrand Russell and Henri Bergson. In the interwar and post-war period, several important thinkers emerged within Marxist philosophy, including Mihailo Marković and Gajo Petrović (member of the Praxis School), who developed a humanist, anti-Stalinist interpretation of Marxism.

Among contemporary Serbian philosophers, the most internationally recognized names are classicist Mihailo Đurić and the religious philosophers, Bishop Nikolaj Velimirović and Justin Popović, whose Orthodox theology continues to have a wide influence.

== Media ==
As of 2001, there were 27 daily newspapers and 580 other newspapers published in Serbia. Some of them have Internet editions. Politika founded in 1904 is the oldest daily newspaper in the Balkans. There were also 491 periodical magazines published in Serbia with the Nedeljne informativne novine (NIN) and Vreme amongst the notable ones. The state exerts its influence on some daily publications such as Večernje novosti and Politika.

Television broadcasting started in 1958 with every country in the former Yugoslavia having its own station. In Serbia, the state television station was known as RTB and became known as RTS (Radio Television of Serbia) after the breakup of Yugoslavia. From the time of Yugoslavia until the Bulldozer Revolution in 2000, the ruling party controlled state broadcasting. NATO bombed the headquarters of the RTS station during its 1999 air-strikes against Yugoslavia, claiming it was being used for propaganda purposes.

There was some private broadcasting with the B92 radio and television station starting in 1989, although it was shut down in 1999 during the hostilities. After the fall of Milošević, RTS became known as the "new" RTS as an assertion of independence while B92 commenced broadcasting. During 2001, there were 70 television centres in Serbia of which 24 were privately owned. In 2003, there was a return to censorship as the government of Zoran Živković temporarily imposed a state of emergency following the assassination of Zoran Djindjic. The European Federation of Journalists continues to have concerns over media freedom in the country.

== Sport ==
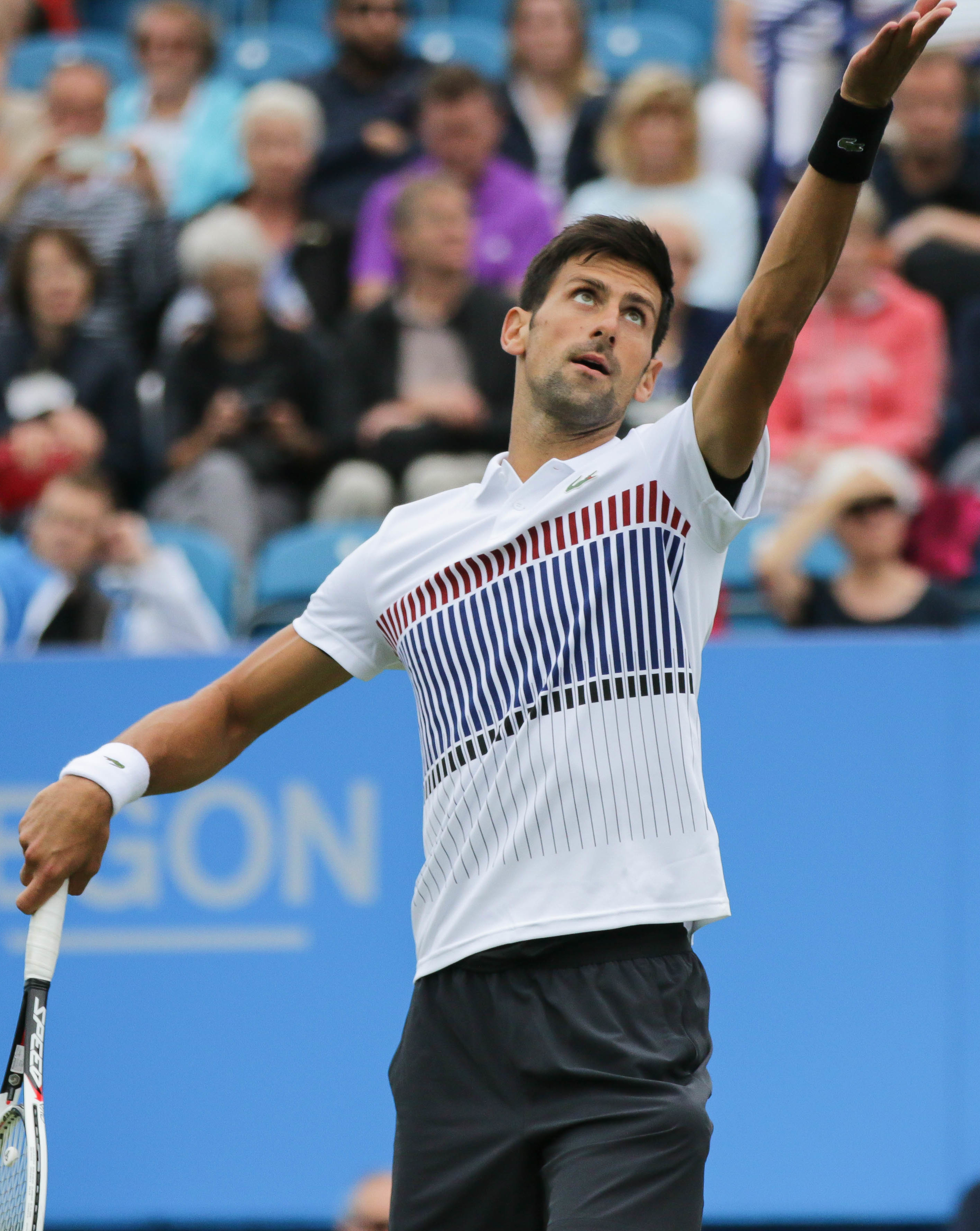
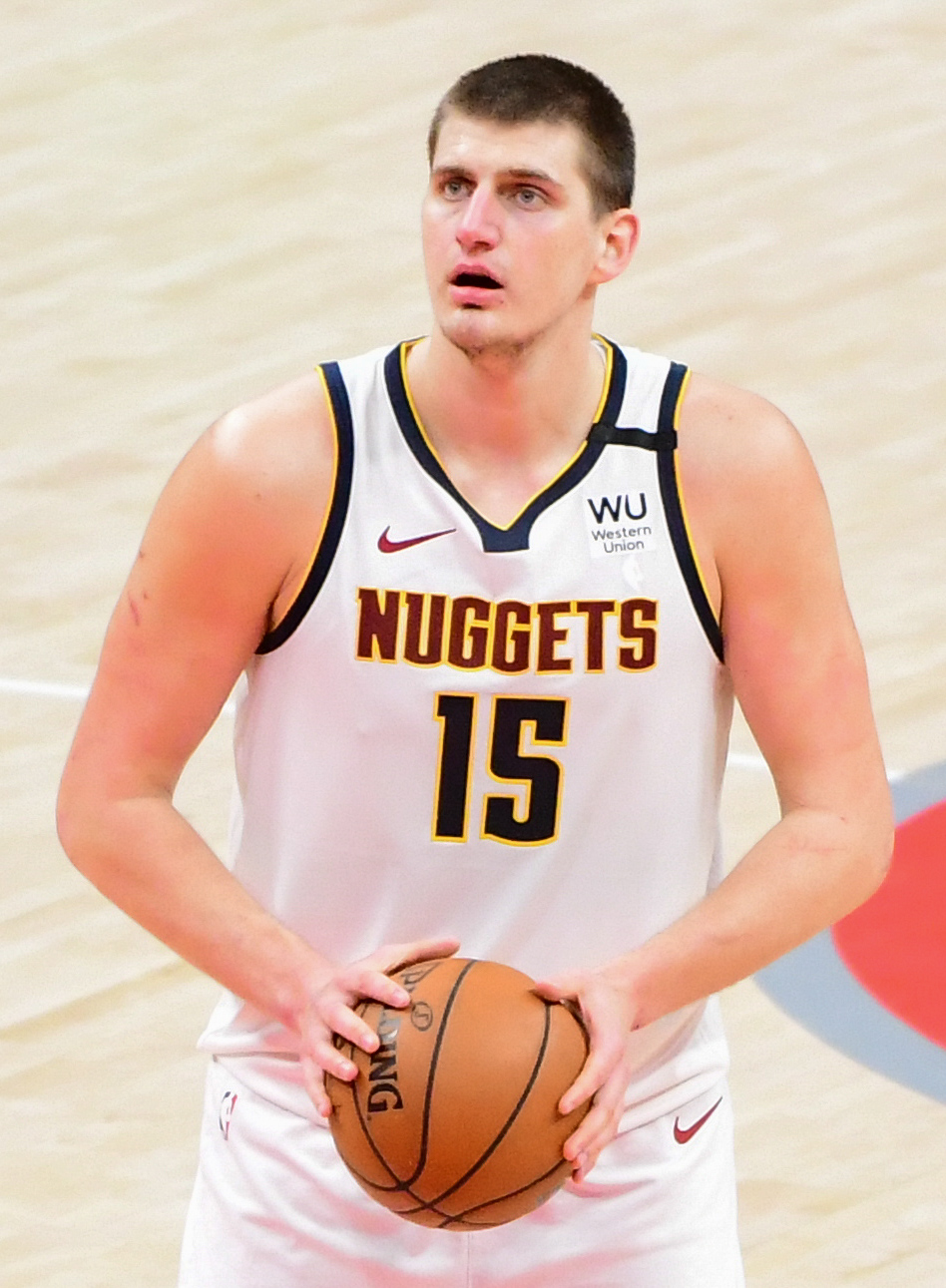
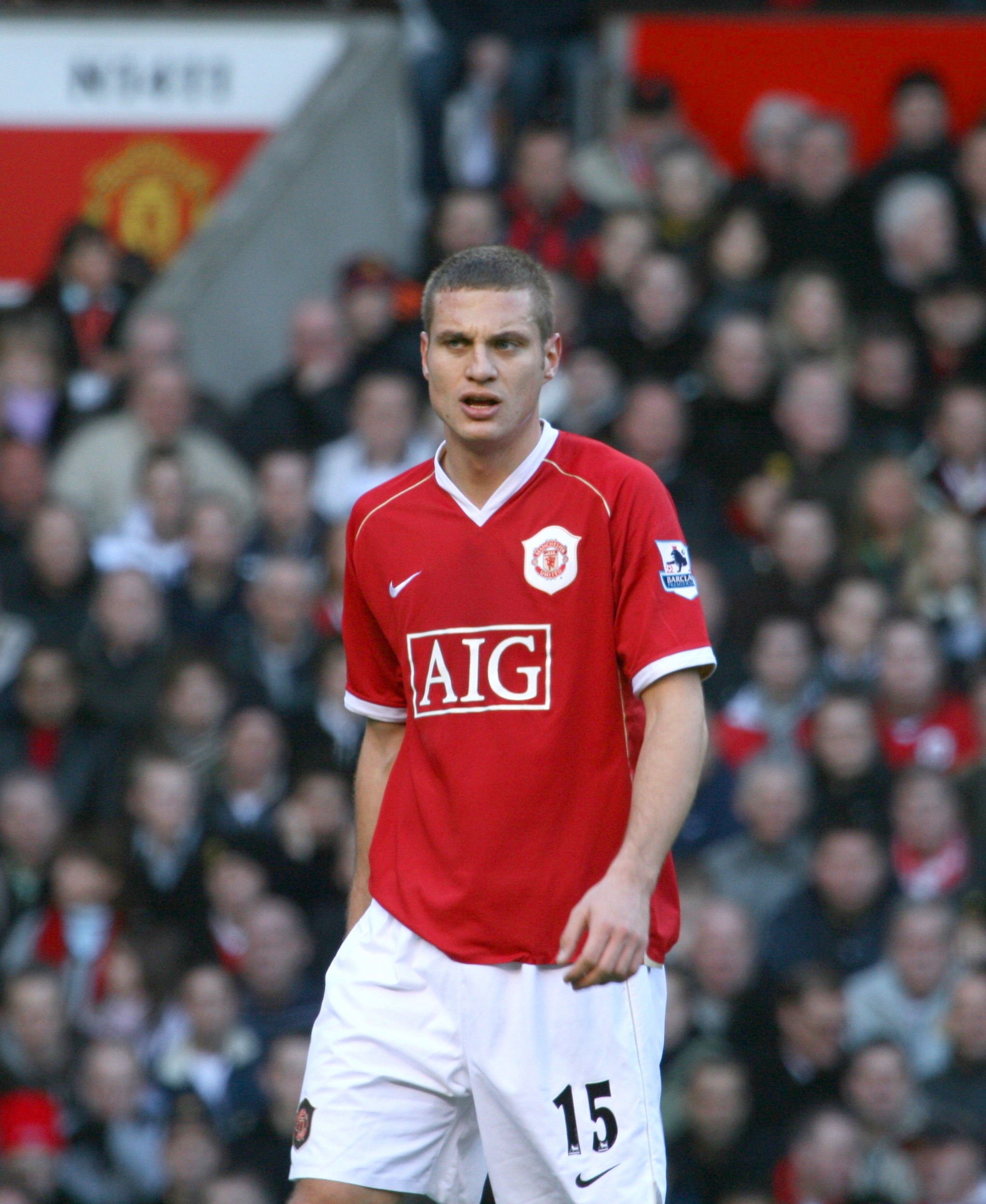
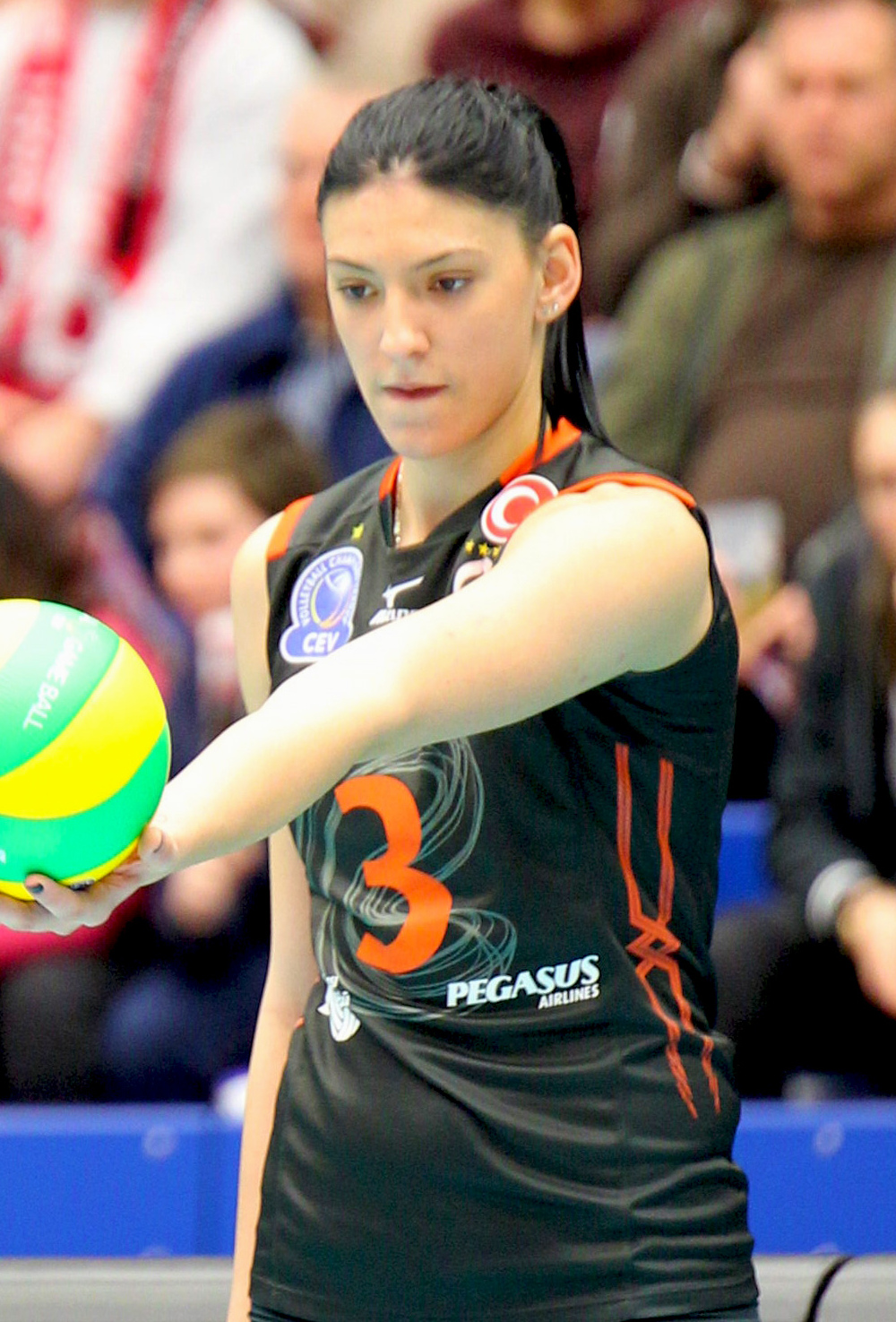
Prominent athletes (clockwise from top left): Novak Djokovic, Nikola Jokić, Nemanja Vidić, Tijana Bošković.

Serbia is very successful in many sports. Among the most popular sports are football, basketball, water polo, sport shooting, handball, volleyball and tennis.

The two most popular football clubs in Serbia are Red Star Belgrade and FK Partizan. Their supporters are the Delije and the Grobari, respectively. The Serbia national football team participated in the 2010, 2018 and 2022 FIFA World Cup.

In basketball, Serbian clubs are successful and participate regularly in European competitions, where they often make quarter-final and semi-final appearances. The Serbian national basketball team is successful in international competitions, having won several FIBA World Championship, EuroBasket and Olympic gold medals.

Serbian men's and women's teams are also World Champions in sports, such as water polo and volleyball.

Serbian tennis players have been successful. Novak Djokovic is the current World No. 1, and he has won twenty-four Grand Slam Singles titles so far. Janko Tipsarević, Viktor Troicki, Jelena Janković and Ana Ivanovic are also successful. The Serbia Davis Cup team won the 2010 Davis Cup Final held in the Belgrade Arena.

== Cultural institutions ==
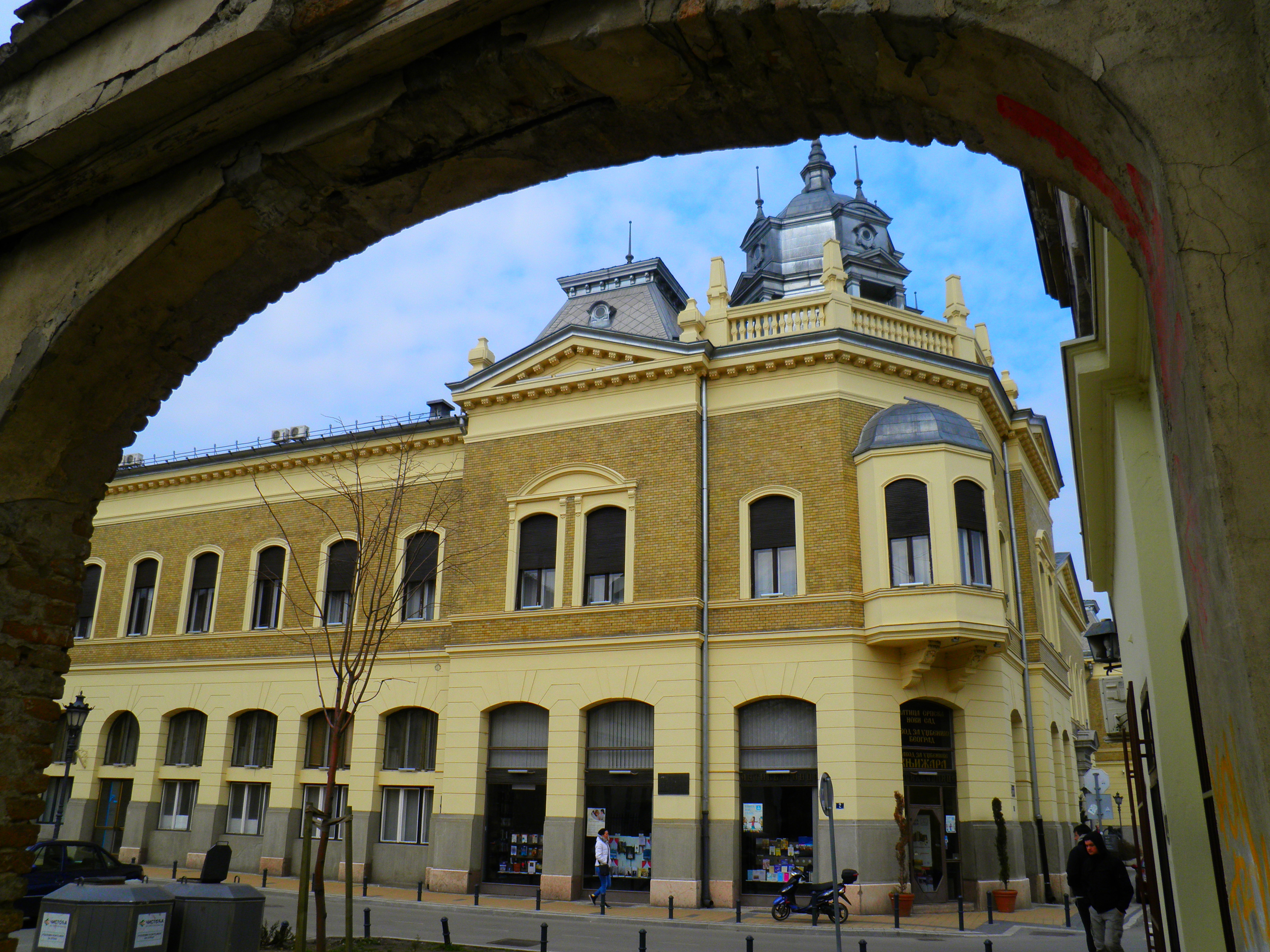
Matica srpska based in Novi Sad, the oldest matica in the world.

At the beginning of the 21st century, there were 32 art galleries and 142 museums in Serbia. Belgrade has many of the most significant with the National Museum of Serbia in Belgrade, the Gallery of Frescoes featuring Orthodox Church art, the Ethnographic Museum and the Princess Ljubica's Residence. Novi Sad contains the Museum of Vojvodina, Gallery of Matica Srpska as well as the Petrovaradin fortress.

Matica Srpska is the oldest and most notable cultural and scientific organisation in today's Serbia. Its name is translated in Serbian as the Serbian matrix or parent body of the Serbs. It was founded in 1826 in Budapest and moved to Novi Sad in 1864. Amongst other achievements, it compiled a six-volume study of the Serbian language between 1967 and 1976. Its journal Letopis Matice Srpske is one of the oldest periodicals examining scientific and cultural issues anywhere in the world. Vojvodina province of Austro-Hungary became attractive for Serbs ever since the fall of Serbia in the 15th century, and was the site of the Great Serbian Migrations, when Serbs colonised the area escaping Turkish vengeance. Sremski Karlovci became the spiritual, political and cultural centre of the Serbs in the Habsburg Empire, with the Metropolitan of the Serbian Orthodox Church residing in the town. To this day, Serbian Patriarch retains the title of Metropolitan of (Sremski) Karlovci. The town featured the earliest Serb and Slavic grammar school (Serbian: gimnazija/гимназија, French: Lycée) founded on August 3, 1791. In 1794, an Orthodox seminary was also founded in the town, ranking second oldest in the world (after the Spiritual Academy in Kyiv). Novi Sad is home to Serbia's oldest professional theatre, founded in 1861 as Serbian National Theatre (serbian: Srpsko Narodno Pozorište), followed by Belgrade in 1868; however two other cities claim this title: City of Kragujevac Knjazesko Srbski Teatar since 1835 and Subotica since 1851 (*there were theatres throughout Serbia long before that time but cannot be classified as "professional").

There is a network of libraries with three national libraries, 689 public libraries, 143 higher education libraries and 11 non-specialised libraries as of 1998. The National Library of Serbia is the most significant of these. Project Rastko, founded in 1997, is an Internet library of Serb culture.

The roots of the Serbian education system date back to the 11th and 12th centuries when the first Catholic colleges were founded in Vojvodina (Titel, Bac). Medieval Serbian education, however, was mostly conducted in Serbian Orthodox monasteries (UNESCO protected Sopoćani, Studenica, Patriarchate of Peć) starting from the rise of Raška in the 12th century, when Serbs overwhelmingly embraced Eastern Orthodoxy rather than Roman Catholicism. The first European-style higher education facilities, however, were founded in Catholic Vojvodina, Teacher's College in Subotica in 1689, although several facilities have functioned even before (e.g. Jesuit School in Belgrade, since 1609). Following the short-lived Serbian independence between 1804 and 1813, Belgrade officially became the educational centre of the country (excluding Vojvodina). The University of Belgrade is the largest and most prestigious institution of higher education in Serbia, founded as the Belgrade Higher School in 1808. The Gymnasium Jovan Jovanović Zmaj was founded in 1810 and many important Serb cultural figures studied there.

Within the Government of Serbia, the Serbian Ministry for Culture is responsible for administering its cultural facilities.

== National symbols ==
Serbian tetragrammatic cross.

Serb civil flag, in continuous use since 1835

- The Serbian flag is a red-blue-white horizontal tricolour.
- The Serbian eagle, a white two-headed eagle, which represents dual power and sovereignty (monarch and church), was the coat of arms of the Nemanjić dynasty.
- The Serbian cross is based on the Byzantine cross, but where the Byzantine Cross held four Greek letter 'V' (or 'B') meaning King of Kings, ruling over Kings, the Serbian cross turned the Byzantine "B" into four Cyrillic letters of 'S' (C) with little stylistic modification, for a whole new message (traditionally rendered as Samo sloga Srbina spasava—Only Unity Saves the Serbs). If displayed on a field, traditionally it is on a red field, but could be used with no field at all.

Both the eagle and the cross, besides being the basis for various Serbian coats of arms through history, are the basis for the symbols of various Serbian organisations, political parties, institutions and companies.

Serbian folk attire varies, mostly because of the very diverse geography and climate of the territory inhabited by the Serbs. Some parts of it are, however, common:

- A traditional shoe that is called the opanak. It is recognisable by its distinctive tips that spiral backward. Each region of Serbia has a different kind of tips.
- A traditional hat that is called the šajkača. It is easily recognisable by its top part that looks like the letter V or like the bottom of a boat (viewed from above), after which it got its name. It gained wide popularity in the early 20th century as it was the hat of the Serbian army in the First World War. It is still worn every day by some villagers today, and it was a common item of headgear among Bosnian Serb military commanders during the Bosnian War in the 1990s. However, the šajkača is common mostly for the Serbian population living in the region of Central Serbia (Šumadija), while Serbs living in Vojvodina, Montenegro, Bosnia and Herzegovina, and Croatia had different types of traditional hats, which are not similar to šajkača. Different types of traditional hats could also be found in eastern and southern parts of Central Serbia.

== See also ==
- Architecture of Serbia
- Cultural Heritage of Serbia
- List of libraries in Serbia
- Serbian literature
- Serbian printing
- Tourism in Serbia
