= Stolovača =

Three-legged wooden chair

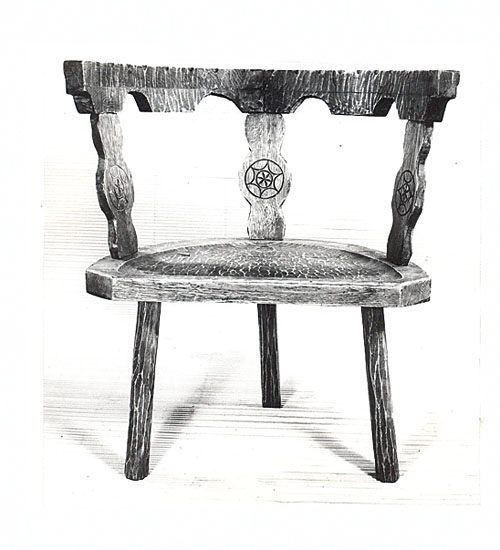
- Designer: Folk (Montenegro and Serbia)
- Materials: Oak
- Style / tradition: Traditional

The Stolovača (Serbian: Столовача) is a traditional three-legged wooden chair characteristic of Montenegro, western Serbia, Republika Srpska and Serbian culture.

The Stolovača is low to the ground with a round-back that juts out to the front, to act as arm rests. This chair, which resembles a throne, is traditionally intended for the head of the household, special guests and generally only males.

Today, this chair is often found in ethno-villages across Serbia and Montenegro, and in traditional restaurants and households.

== See also ==
- Serbian culture
- Montenegrin culture
