= Dušan =

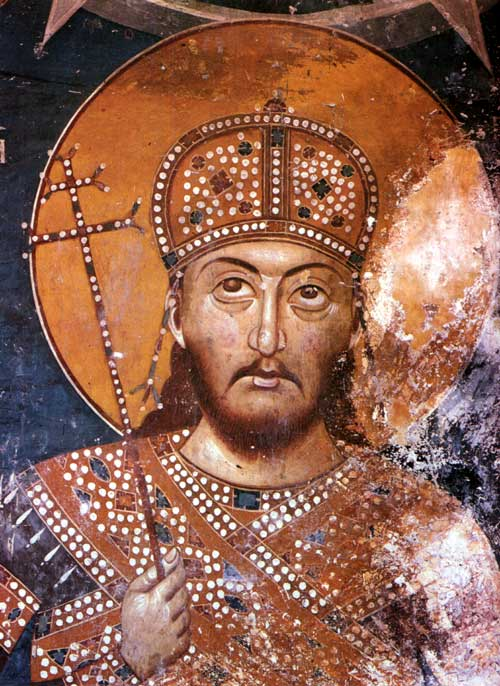
- Mid-14th-century fresco of Stefan Dušan, in Lesnovo Monastery, North Macedonia
- Pronunciation: Czech: [ˈduʃan] Serbo-Croatian: [dǔʃan] Slovak: [ˈduʂan]
- Gender: male
- Language: Slavic

Origin
- Language: Slavic
- Origin: duša "soul"
- Derivation: duš- (root) + an (suffix)
- Region of origin: Slavic

Other names
- Pet names: Dule, Duća (in Serbian)
- Related names: Duško (Serbian), Duchoslav (Czech)

Dušan (Serbian Cyrillic: Душан) is a masculine given name of South Slavic origin. Today it is primarily used in the Western South Slavic languages and in Czech and Slovak. The name is derived from the Slavic noun duša ('spirit').

== Occurrence ==
Name	Count people (Rank)	State	Date
Dušan	14,972	Czech Republic	2016
Dušan	40,191 (57th; 19th man's)	Slovakia	2000-10
Dušan	7,660 (33rd)	Slovenia	2021-01-01
Dušan	3,796	Croatia	2021

In Serbia, it was the 29th most popular name for males, as of 2010.

== People ==
- Stefan Uroš IV Dušan (c. 1308–1355), Emperor of the Serbian Empire
- Dušan Bajević (born 1948), Bosnian former footballer and current football manager
- Dušan Bařica (born 1975), Czech ice hockey player
- Dušan Basta (born 1984), Serbian footballer
- Dušan Bavdek (born 1971), Slovenian composer
- Dušan Bogdanović (born 1955), Serbian-born American composer and classical guitarist
- Dusan Djuric (born 1984), Swedish international footballer of Serbian descent
- Dušan Domović Bulut (born 1985), Serbian 3x3 basketball player
- Dušan Džamonja (1928–2009), Croatian sculptor
- Dušan Fitzel (born 1963), Slovak footballer and football manager
- Dušan Galis (born 1949), Slovak footballer and football manager
- Dušan Hájek (born 1946), Slovak drummer and percussionist
- Dušan Keketi (footballer) (born 1951), Slovak footballer
- Dušan Keketi (born 1975), Slovak politician
- Dušan Kalmančok (born 1945), Slovak astronomer
- Dušan Kaprálik (1948–2023), Slovak actor
- Dušan Kerkez (born 1976), Bosnian former footballer and current football manager
- Dušan Kovačević (born 1948), Serbian playwright
- Dušan Lajović (born 1990), Serbian tennis player
- Dušan Makavejev (1932–2019), Serbian film director
- Dušan Mandić (born 1994), Serbian water polo player, Olympic champion
- Dušan Maravić (1939–2025), Serbian footballer
- Dušan Matić (1898–1980), Serbian poet
- Dušan Mihajlović (born 1948), Serbian politician
- Dušan Mihajlović (born 1985), Serbian footballer
- Dušan Miletić (born 1998), Serbian basketball player
- Dušan Mlađan (born 1986), Serbian-born Swiss basketball player
- Dušan Otašević (born 1940), Serbian painter and sculptor
- Dušan Pašek (1960–1998), Slovak ice hockey player
- Dušan Petković (footballer born 1974), Serbian former footballer
- Dušan Petković (footballer born 1903) (1903–1979), Serbian and Yugoslav football forward
- Dušan Petrič (1916–1964), Slovene painter and graphic designer
- Dušan Petronijević (born 1983), Serbian footballer
- Dušan Pirjevec (1921–1977), Slovenian literary historian, philosopher and resistance fighter
- Dušan Poloz (born 1965), Slovak handball coach
- Dušan Popović, several people
- Dušan Radović (1922–1984), Serbian journalist and writer
- Dušan Repovš (born 1954), Slovenian mathematician
- Dušan Salfický (born 1972), Czech ice hockey player
- Dušan Šestić (born 1946), Bosnian musician, composer of the Bosnian national anthem
- Dušan Slobodník (1927–2001), Slovak literary theoretician, translator and politician
- Dušan Švantner (born 1946), Slovak politician
- Dušan Tadić (born 1988), Serbian footballer
- Dušan Třeštík (1933–2007), Czech historian
- Dušan Uhrin (born 1943), Slovak footballer and football manager
- Dušan Uhrin Jr (born 1967), Slovak football manager and the son of Dušan Uhrin
- Dušan Velič (1966–2023), Slovak chemist and politician
- Dušan Vemić (born 1976), Serbian tennis player
- Dušan Vlahović (born 2000), Serbian footballer
- Spyridon of Tremithus (c. 270–348), known in Slovak as Dušan, Greek Christian bishop of Tremithus and saint

== See also ==
- Dušanovo (disambiguation)
