= Duchoň =

Duchoň (feminine: Duchoňová) is a Czech and Slovak surname. It was probably derived from the name Duchoslav. The oldest document of the surname is from 1424. Notable people with the surname include:

- Deborah Duchon (1949–2019), American anthropologist
- Ferdinand Duchoň (born 1938), Czech cyclist
- Karol Duchoň (1950–1985), Slovak singer
- Petr Duchoň (born 1956), Czech politician
