= Dusan =

Dusan may refer to:

- Dušan, a Slavic given name
- Dusan, a son of Ra's al Ghul
- Stefan Dušan (1308–1355), emperor of Serbia

== See also ==
- Doosan Group, a South Korean multinational conglomerate
