= Dušek =

Dušek (feminine: Dušková) is a Czech surname, derived from the name Duchoslav. A Germanised version of the surname is Duschek. Notable people with the surname include:

- Anna Dušková (born 1999), Czech figure skater
- Antonín Dušek (born 1986), Czech ice hockey player
- František Xaver Dušek (1731–1799), Czech composer
- Jakob Dusek (born 1996), Austrian snowboarder
- Jan Vítězslav Dušek (1891–1966), Czech sculptor
- Jaroslav Dušek (born 1961), Czech actor
- Josepha Duschek (Czech: Josefína Dušková; 1754–1824), Czech opera singer
- Libuše Dušková (born 1930), Czech linguist
- Marie Dušková (1903–1968), Czech poet
- Robert Dušek (born 1967), Czech politician
- Vendula Dušková (born 1998), Czech para swimmer

== See also ==
- 14054 Dušek, main belt asteroid
