= Dušanovo =

Dušanovo may refer to:

- Bačko Dušanovo, a village in the municipality of Subotica, Serbia
- Dušanovo, Leskovac, a village in the municipality of Leskovac, Serbia
- Dušanovo, Prizren, a village in the municipality of Prizren, Kosovo; see List of populated places in Kosovo
- Dušanovo (Gradiška), a settlement near Gradiška, Bosnia and Herzegovina
