= Duschek =

Duschek is a German surname, a Germanized version of the Czech surname Dušek. Notable people with the surname include:

- Ferenc Duschek (1797–1872), Hungarian politician
- Franz Xaver Duschek (1731–1799), Czech composer
- Harald Duschek (born 1956), German ski jumper
- Josepha Duschek (1754–1824), Czech opera singer
