= Duchoslav =

Duchoslav (feminine: Duchoslavová) is a Czech surname and formerly a given name, today only rarely used. It originated from the roots duch ('spirit') and slav ('glory'), meaning 'glorious in spirit'. Notable people with the surname include:

- Jan Antonín Duchoslav (born 1965), Czech actor
- Josef Duchoslav (born 1967), Czech ice hockey player

== See also ==
- Dušan, given name derived from Duchoslav
- Dušek, surname derived from Duchoslav
