= Čuvari Hristovog groba =

Religious/cultural practice of guarding a representation of Christ's grave on Good Friday

- Also called: Гробари
- Observed by: Serbian Orthodox Christians
- Observances: Feast day
- Date: Good Friday (Julian calendar)
- Duration: 3 days
- Frequency: Annual
- Related to: Easter

Čuvari Hristovog Groba (Serbian Cyrillic: Чувари Хрстовог гроба; "Guardians of Christ's Grave") refers to a religious/cultural practice of guarding a representation of Christ's grave on Good Friday in the Church of St. Nicholas by the Serbian Orthodox inhabitants in the town of Vrlika in Northern Dalmatia, Croatia and Batajnica, Serbia.

Exact knowledge of when this custom began in Vrlika, is not known. According to oral tradition, the custom is believed to have been brought to Vrlika from Jerusalem during the 16th century. Undoubtedly a long tradition, the practice of guarding Christ's grave is embedded in the history of Vrlika and its Orthodox Christian inhabitants.

There are no significant differences in the ceremony or uniforms between the Orthodox and Catholic traditions.

Prior to 1991, when the observation of Easter fell on the same day, Orthodox and Catholic Guardian's would visit each other's churches, celebrating and leaving gifts at both churches. The tradition is well known as an example of Vrlika's Orthodox and Catholic populations close relationship and tolerance towards each other.

Čuvari Hristovog Groba is one of Serbia's candidates for UNESCO's Intangible cultural heritage-list.

== Description ==
The Church of St. Nicholas was founded in 1618. It is not known when the tradition began, although folklore tells that it has existed for more than four centuries.

The guards arrive at the church dressed in folk costumes of Vrlika and nine nearby villages, led by the harambaša (chief), and two guards take place at the north and south of the tomb of the Christ. There are frequent changing of the guards' places, and they march quietly through the church unobtrusively, in solid piety, until they take their seats and stare at the Holy Shroud. The custom originates from folk piety and do not disturb the harmony of church prayers, but embellishes the liturgy with elements of warrior dignity. A guardian of the tomb can only be an honourable and devout Serbian Orthodox male from Vrlika and its nine surrounding villages.

== Controversy ==
The Republic of Croatia sent a letter to the Association of Čuvari Hristovog Groba, requesting that the tradition be presented as a Croatian national tradition. Association President, Dragan Pavlović, said that the Republic of Croatia had already presented Sinjska alka and another folk tradition, Ojkanje singing, as Croatian traditions (in UNESCO), and that the Serbian inhabitants of the region "will not give them Čuvari Hristovog Groba".

According to Pavlović, the tradition was initially solely Serb and entered local Catholic liturgical practice only with the Uniate (Catholicization) of local Serbs, thus, Pavlović says that "it is therefore Croats appropriate this Serb tradition [...] we Serbs do not want to, in this way, be Catholicizated."

These assertions are disputed by the Croatian historians as bogus, since this custom is widespread throughout Catholic parishes in Croatia, but also in Catholic Italy and Spain - yet it is only practiced in one Orthodox church in Croatia.

== Sources ==
- "Čuvari Hristovog groba". Pravoslavlje.
- "Riznica – Čuvari Hristovog groba". RTS.
