= Dušan Bařica =

Czech ice hockey forward

- Born: August 26, 1975 (age 50) Zlín, Czechoslovakia
- Height: 5 ft 10 in (178 cm)
- Weight: 198 lb (90 kg; 14 st 2 lb)
- Position: Forward
- Shot: Left
- Played for: HC Havířov; HC Zlin; MHC Martin; Brest Albatros Hockey; Ducs de Dijon
- Playing career: 1994–2009

Dušan Bařica (born August 26, 1975) is a Czech former professional ice hockey forward.

Although he spent the majority of his career in the 1st Czech Republic Hockey League, Bařica managed to play eleven games in the Czech Extraliga, nine for HC Havířov and two for HC Zlín. He also played seven games in the Tipsport Liga for MHC Martin and 24 games in the French Super 16, eight for Brest Albatros Hockey and sixteen for Ducs de Dijon.
