= Josef Duchoslav =

Czech ice hockey player

- Born: March 21, 1967 (age 59) Hodonín, Czechoslovakia
- Height: 6 ft 2 in (188 cm)
- Weight: 220 lb (100 kg; 15 st 10 lb)
- Position: Right wing
- Shot: Right
- Played for: TJ Zetor Brno; KLH Jindřichův Hradec; ASD Dukla Jihlava; MHC Martin
- Playing career: 1986–2006

Josef Duchoslav (born March 21, 1967) is a former professional ice hockey right winger from Czechoslovakia.

Duchoslav played 70 games in the Czechoslovak First Ice Hockey League for TJ Zetor Brno and 27 games in the Czech Extraliga for KLH Jindřichův Hradec and ASD Dukla Jihlava. He also played 16 games in the Tipsport Liga for MHC Martin.
