= Serbo-Croatian kinship =

Language kinship terms

The Serbo-Croatian standard languages (Serbian, Croatian, Bosnian and Montenegrin) have one of the more elaborate kinship (srodstvo) systems among European languages. Terminology may differ from place to place. Most words are common to other Slavic languages, though some derive from Turkish. The standardized languages may recognize slightly different pronunciations or dialectical forms; all terms are considered standard in all language standards, unless otherwise marked: ^{[S]} (Serbian), ^{[C]} (Croatian), ^{[B]} (Bosnian) and ^{[M]} (Montenegrin) below.

There are four main types of kinship in the family: biological a.k.a. blood kinship, kinship by law (in-laws), spiritual kinship (such as godparents), and legal kinship through adoption and remarriage. As is common in many rural family structures, three generations of a family will live together in a home in what anthropologists call a joint family structure, where parents, their son(s), and grandchildren would cohabit in a family home.

== Direct descendance and ancestry ==
Words for relations up to five generations removed—great-great-grandparents and great-great-grandchildren—are in common use. The fourth-generation terms are also used as generics for ancestors and descendants. There is no distinction between the maternal and paternal line.

Latin	Cyrillic	Relation
čukununuka šukununuka ^{[C]}	чукунунука шукунунука ^{[C]}	great-great-granddaughter
čukununuk šukununuk ^{[C]}	чукунунук шукунунук ^{[C]}	great-great-grandson
praunuka	праунука	great-granddaughter, descendant
praunuk	праунук	great-grandson, descendant
unuka	унука	granddaughter
unuk	унук	grandson
kćer kćerka ćerka kći	кћер кћерка ћерка кћи	daughter
sin	син	son
majka mater mati	мајка матер мати	mother
mama keva	мама кева	mom
otac	отац	father
babo ^{[B]} ćaća ^{[C]} ćale ^{[S]} tajo ^{[M]} tata	бабо ^{[B]} ћаћа ^{[C]} ћале ^{[S]} тајо ^{[M]} тата	dad
baba baka nana ^{[B]} nona	баба бака нана ^{[B]} нона	grandmother
ded(a) deka ^{[S]} did(a) ^{[C]} dido djed đed ^{[M]} nono ^{[C]} dedo ^{[B]}	дед(a) дека ^{[S]} дид(a) ^{[C]} дидо дјед ђед ^{[M]} ноно ^{[C]} дедо ^{[B]}	grandfather
prababa prabaka	прабаба прабака	great-grandmother, ancestor
praded(a) pradid(a) ^{[C]} pradido pradjed prađed ^{[M]}	прадед(a) прадид(a) ^{[C]} прадидо прадјед прађед ^{[M]}	great-grandfather, ancestor
čukunbaba šukunbaka ^{[C]}	чукунбаба шукунбака ^{[C]}	great-great-grandmother
čukunded(a) čukundjed čukunđed ^{[M]} šukundid(a) ^{[C]} šukundjed ^{[C]}	чукундед(a) чукундјед чукунђед ^{[M]} шукундид(a) ^{[C]} шукундјед ^{[C]}	great-great-grandfather
predakinja ^{[S]} pretkinja ^{[C]} pređa ^{[M]}	предакиња ^{[S]} преткиња ^{[C]} пређа ^{[M]}	female ancestor
predak	предак	male ancestor

== Own generation ==
Diminutive forms of siblings are used for cousins.

Latin	Cyrillic	English translation
brat	брат	brother
sestra	сестра	sister
bratić ^{[C]}	братић ^{[C]}	male first cousin
sestrična ^{[C]}	сестрична ^{[C]}	female first cousin
sin od strica stričević amidžić	син од стрица стричевић амиџић	male cousin (always first or second), son of father's brother (or male first cousin)
sin od daja sin od ujaka daidžić ujčević	син од даја син од ујака даиџић ујчевић	male cousin (always first or second), son of mother's brother (or male first cousin)
sin od hale sin od tetke tetić tetkić tetišnji	син од хале син од тетке тетић теткић тетишњи	male cousin (always first or second), son of mother's or father's sister (or female first cousin)
kćer od strica stričevka admidžišnja	кћер од стрица стричевићка амиџишња	female cousin (always first or second), daughter of father's brother (or male first cousin)
kćer od daja sestra od ujaka ujčevka daidžišnja	кћер од даја кћер од ујака даиџишња ујчевићка	female cousin (always first or second), daughter of mother's brother (or male first cousin)
kćer od hale kćer od tetke tetišnja	кћер од хале кћер од тетке тетишња	female cousin (always first or second), daughter of mother's or father's sister (or female first cousin)
rođak	рођак	male cousin, relative
rođaka ^{[S]} rođakinja rodica ^{[C]}	рођака ^{[S]} рођакиња родица ^{[C]}	female cousin, relative

== Indirect ancestry, descendants and legal relations ==
There are separate terms for maternal and paternal uncles, but not for aunts. In addition, spouses of uncles and aunts have their own terms.

Latin	Cyrillic	Relation
amidža adžo stric čiča čika ćić	амиџа аџо стриц чича чика ћић	paternal uncle
amidžinica adžinica strina	амиџиница аџиница стрина	paternal uncle's wife
daidža / dajdža dajo ujak	даиџа / дајџа дајо ујак	maternal uncle
daidžinica / dajdžinica dajnica ujna	даиџиница / дајџиница дајница ујна	maternal uncle's wife; i.e. maternal aunt through marriage
hala tetka	хала тетка	aunt (only mother's or father's sister or cousin)
teča ^{[S]} tetak	теча ^{[S]} тетак	aunt's husband (where aunt defined as tetka)
bratanac	братанац	fraternal nephew (for women^{[S]}, for men and women^{[C]})
bratanić bratić	братанић братић	fraternal nephew (for men and women)
sinovac	синовац	fraternal nephew (for men^{[S]})
bratanica brataničina bratičina	братаница братаничина братичина	fraternal niece
nećak	нећак	nephew
nećaka nećakinja	нећака нећакиња	niece
sestrić	сестрић	sororal nephew
sestričina	сестричина	sororal niece

== In-laws ==
There are separate terms for a man's and a woman's parents-in-law. However, the same terms are commonly used for siblings-in-law and children-in-law. There are separate terms for co-siblings-in-law.

Latin	Cyrillic	Relation	English translation
svekar	свекар	husband's father	father-in-law
svekrva	свекрва	husband's mother	mother-in-law
punac ^{[C]} tast^{[S]}	пунац ^{[C]} таст ^{[S]}	wife's father	father-in-law
punica ^{[C]} tašta^{[S]}	пуница ^{[C]} ташта ^{[S]}	wife's mother	mother-in-law
zet	зет	daughter's or sister's husband	son-in-law or brother-in-law
nev(j)esta odiva ^{[M]} snaha snaja ^{[C, S]} snaša	нев(ј)еста одива ^{[M]} снаха снаjа ^{[C, S]} снаша	son's or brother's wife	daughter-in-law or sister-in-law
šura(k) šurjak^{[C]} šogor^{[C]}	шура(к) шурjак ^{[C]} шогор ^{[C]}	wife's brother	brother-in-law
šurjakinja^{[C]} šurnjaja šurnaja	шурјакиња^{[C]} шурњаја шурнаја	wife's brother's wife	sister-in-law
svastika šogorica ^{[C]}	свастика шогорица ^{[C]}	wife's sister	sister-in-law
svastić	свастић	wife's sister's son	nephew-in-law
svastičina	свастичина	wife's sister's daughter	niece-in-law
badženjak badžo d(j)ever đever ^{[M]}	баџењак баџо д(j)евер ђевер ^{[M]}	husband's brother	brother-in-law
jetrva	јетрва	husband's brother's wife	co-sister-in-law
zaova	заова	husband's sister	sister-in-law
zaovac	заовац	husband's sister's husband	co-brother-in-law
pašanac pašenog badžo	пашанац пашеног баџо	wife's sister's husband	co-brother-in-law
prija	прија	child's spouse's mother	co-mother-in-law
prijatelj prika	пријатељ прика	child's spouse's father	co-father-in-law; note: the same word means 'friend' (general word)

== Step-relatives ==
There are spouses of ancestors that are not blood relatives and their spouse's descendants, the second spouse of a father's or mother's siblings (paternal or maternal step-aunts and step-uncles) and their children.

Latin	Cyrillic	Relation
očuh	очух	stepfather
maćeha	маћеха	stepmother
pastorak	пасторак	stepson
pastorka pastorkinja	пасторка пасторкиња	stepdaughter
polubrat	полубрат	half-brother (through only one parent)
– brat po ocu	брат по оцу	half-brother (sharing same father, different mothers)
– brat po majci	брат по мајци	half-brother (sharing same mother, different fathers)
polusestra	полусестра	half-sister (through only one parent)
– sestra po ocu	сестра по оцу	half-sister (sharing same father, different mothers)
– sestra po majci	сестра по мајци	half-sister (sharing same mother, different fathers)

== Foster relatives ==
Foster relations also have dedicated terms.

Latin	Cyrillic	Relation
usvojenik	усвојеник	adopted son
usvojenica	усвојеница	adopted daughter
poočim	поочим	foster father
pomajka	помајка	foster mother
posinak usinjenik ^{[S]}	посинак усињеник ^{[S]}	foster son
po(k)ćerka	по(к)ћерка	foster daughter
