= Marie Dušková =

Marie Dušková (6 October 1903 – 14 December 1968) was a Czech poet.

She was a participant of Pracující do literatury (Workers in Literature) and soon became known as an example of working-class literature of the 1950s.
