= Dušan Popović =

Dušan Popović may refer to:

- Dušan Popović (1877–1958), Vojvodina Serb lawyer, Croat-Serb politician, member of the Croatian and Hungarian Parliaments
- Dušan A. Popović (1884–1918), Serbian politician with the Serbian Social Democratic Party
- Dušan J. Popović (1894-1985), Serbian historian
- Dušan Popović (water polo) (1970–2011), Serbian water polo player
- Dušan Popović (footballer) (born 1981), Serbian footballer
- Dušan Popović (chess player) (born 1983), Serbian chess player, see template:Serbian grandmasters
