= Church of St. Nicholas, Vrlika =

Serbian Orthodox church in Vrlika, Croatia

- Crkva svetog oca Nikole; Црква светог оца Николе
- Church of St. Nicholas, Vrlika
- 43°54′47″N 16°23′55″E
- Location: Vrlika
- Country: Croatia
- Denomination: Serbian Orthodox

History
- Dedication: Saint Nicholas

Administration
- Archdiocese: Eparchy of Dalmatia

The Church of Saint Nicholas (Serbian Cyrillic: Црква Светог Оца Николе) is a Serbian Orthodox church in the town of Vrlika, located in Northern Dalmatia, Croatia.

== History ==
Built in 1618, the Orthodox church dedicated to Saint Nicholas is the oldest religious object built in Vrlika. A bell tower was added and consecrated by hieromonk Vikentija (Stojisavljević) from Dragović monastery in 1801 and its current iconostas dates from the mid-19th century.

Throughout the centuries, the church was the target multiple arson attempts during world wars and most recently, the Yugoslav Civil War. On 28 May 1972, the church was severely damaged in a fire set by Croatian nationalists during the Croatian Spring crisis, only to be restored two years later on 26 May 1974. Between 1990 and 1991, explosives were planted around the church several times by Croatian nationalists.

Starting in 2015, renovations were made to the church with new doors, windows and a new metal staircase leading up to the bell tower. A complete restoration of the church exterior facade was also included in the project which cost approximately one hundred thousand Euros raised by Vrlika's Serbian Orthodox faithful from all around the world.

In August 2018, the Serbian Orthodox inhabitants of Vrlika along with many Vrlika Serbs from the diaspora, congregated in Vrlika to celebrate the 400 year anniversary of the church.

== Traditions ==
Čuvari Hristovog Groba (Serbian: Чувари Хрстовог Гроба; "Guardians of Christ's Grave"). The tradition of Čuvari Hristovog Groba (Serbian: Чувари Хрстовог Гроба; "Guardians of Christ's Grave") is a long held Easter tradition in Vrlika and the Church of Saint Nicholas. Although exact knowledge of when this custom began in Vrlika is not known but, according to oral tradition, the custom is believed to have been brought to Vrlika from Jerusalem during the 16th century The tradition was first mentioned in the church records in 1764.

== See also ==
- Dragović monastery, Serbian Orthodox monastery founded in 1395 near Vrlika
- List of Serbian Orthodox churches in Croatia

== Annotations ==
- Name: Church of Holy Father Nikolaj (Храм Св. Оца Николаја)
