= Need-fire =

Fire kindled as protective magic

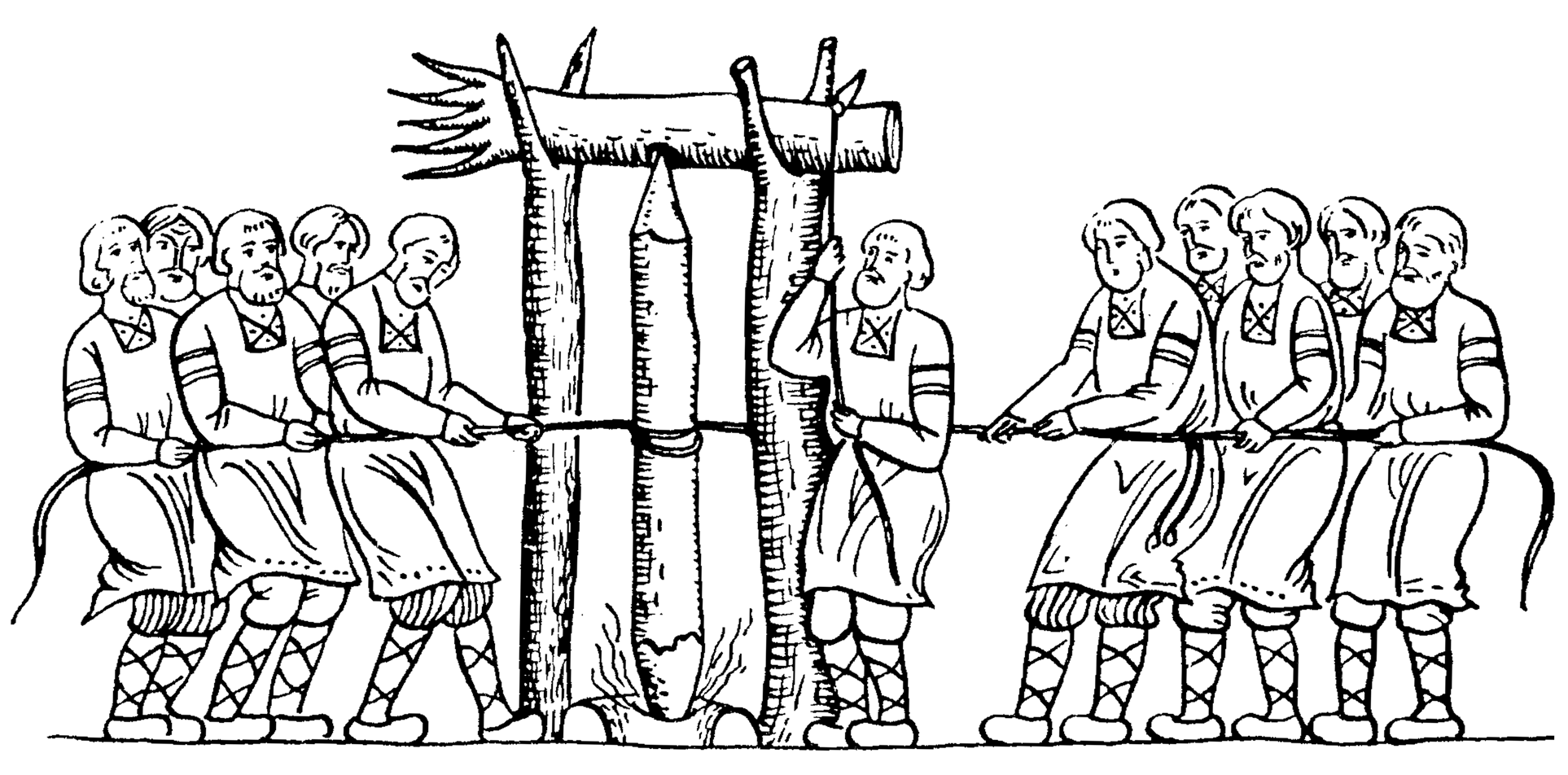
A drawing of a need-fire being kindled with a large fire drill.

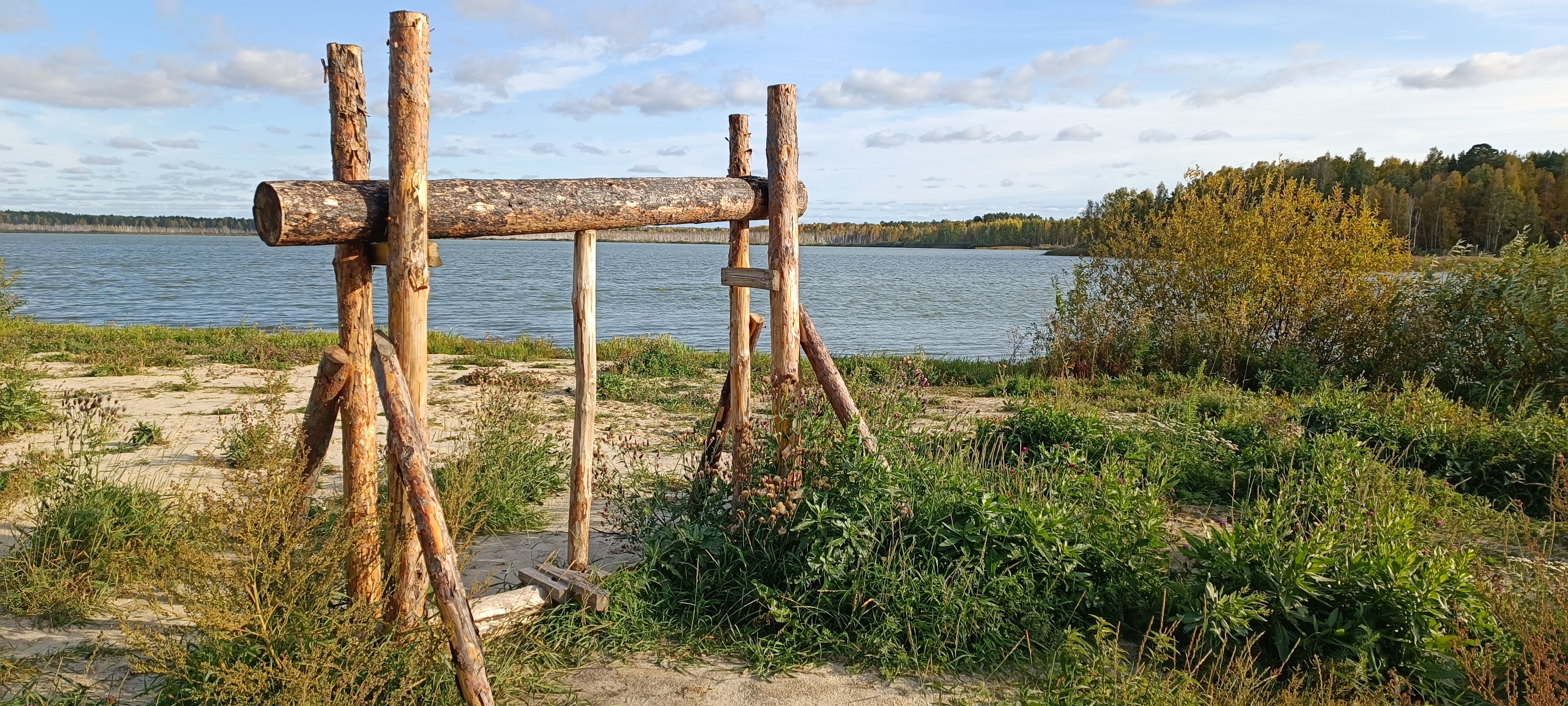
A modern Rodnovery need-fire drill in Russia

In European folklore, a need-fire (Albanian: zjarri i gjallë; German: Notfeuer, Old High German: nodfyr, Scottish Gaelic: tein'-éigin, Russian: Живой огонь) is a fire kindled by friction, which is lit in a ritual and used as protective magic against murrain (infectious diseases affecting cattle), plague and witchcraft. It was a tradition in parts of Europe, practiced by Germanic, Gaelic and Slavic peoples until the 19th century, and by Albanians until the 20th century.

A need-fire would usually be lit when there was an epidemic such as an outbreak of plague or cattle disease. In some regions, a need-fire was lit yearly to prevent such disasters. In the Scottish Highlands they were lit each year at Beltane (1 May), in Poland they were lit on Saint Roch's Day, and in parts of Germany they were also lit yearly.

The need-fire could only be kindled by friction between wood, usually with a large fire drill made from oak. Usually an upright pole would be spun against a level plank until it catches fire. The pole would be spun by pulling a rope wound around it. This would all be held together by a square frame. Both the wooden parts and the rope should be new; if possible, it should be woven of strands taken from a gallows rope.

The need-fire could only be lit after all other fires were doused. In one case, the kindling of the need-fire in a village near Quedlinburg, Germany, was hindered by a night light burning in the parsonage. In parts of the Scottish Highlands, the rule that all other fires be doused applied only to the land between the two nearest streams.

Only certain people could make the need-fire. In the Scottish Highlands, usually it had to be kindled by nine men, after they had removed all metal. In one account from Caithness, a large need-fire had to be kindled by eighty-one men, divided into nine shifts of nine. In some regions, the rope should always be pulled by two brothers, while in Silesia, the tree used to make the need-fire had to be felled by a pair of twin brothers. In Serbia, the need-fire was sometimes kindled by a boy and girl, between eleven and fourteen years of age, who worked naked in a dark room. In Bulgaria, two naked men would kindle the fire by rubbing dry branches together in the forest, and with the flame they lit two fires, one on each side of a crossroad haunted by wolves. The cattle are then driven between the two fires, from which glowing embers are taken to rekindle the cold hearths in the houses.

When the need-fire was kindled, a bonfire was lit from it. The flames, smoke and ashes were believed to protect and purify. Livestock would be driven around the bonfire, or over its embers once it had died down somewhat. The ashes would be scattered over fields to protect crops, and young people would mark each other with them. Torches from the bonfire would be carried home and used to rekindle the hearth fires. In the Scottish Highlands, a pot of water was heated with the new fire, mixed with some of the ash, and sprinkled on sick people and cattle. Sir James George Frazer wrote that he had heard that on the Isle of Mull, a sick heifer would be cut up and burned as a sacrifice.

== See also ==
- Badnjak (Croatian)
- Badnjak (Serbian)
