= Zapis =

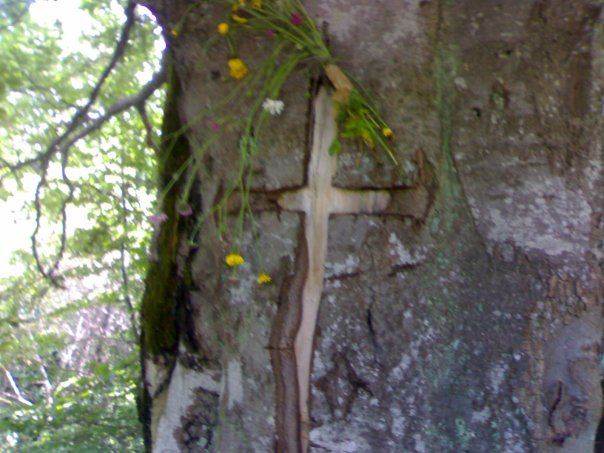
Cross inscribed into the bark of a zapis (a beech in this case), near the village of Crna Trava, southeast Serbia

A zapis (Serbian Cyrillic: запис, Serbian pronunciation: [zǎːpis], literally "inscription"; plural: zapisi (записи)) is a sacred tree in Serbian Orthodox tradition, protecting the village within whose bounds it is situated. A cross is inscribed into the bark of each zapis. Most of these trees are large oaks. Prayers are offered to God under the crown of the zapis, where church services may also be held, especially during village festivals observed to supplicate God for protection against destructive weather conditions. In settlements without a church, ceremonies such as weddings and baptisms were once conducted under the tree. Folk tradition maintains that great misfortune will befall anyone that dares fell a zapis. According to Serbian scholar Veselin Čajkanović, the zapis is inherited from Slavic paganism, the pre-Christian religion of the Serbs, in which it had been used as a temple.

== Religious practices ==
The selected tree becomes a zapis through the rite of consecration performed by a Serbian Orthodox priest, in which a cross is inscribed into its bark. The zapis is chosen from large trees, primarily oaks, but also elms, ashes, horse chestnuts, large-leaved lindens, walnut trees, morus trees, beeches, apple trees, pear trees, and hazels. A large cross, often made of stone, may be erected beside the zapis, and the surrounding area may be fenced. The zapis is inviolable: it is believed that great misfortune will befall anyone that dares fell it. Climbing it, sleeping under it, and picking its fruits and twigs, are also forbidden. Even the branches and fruits that fall from the tree should not be collected. A village may have more than one zapis: the main one in the settlement or near it, and several others in the village's fields, usually chosen so that they surround the settlement.

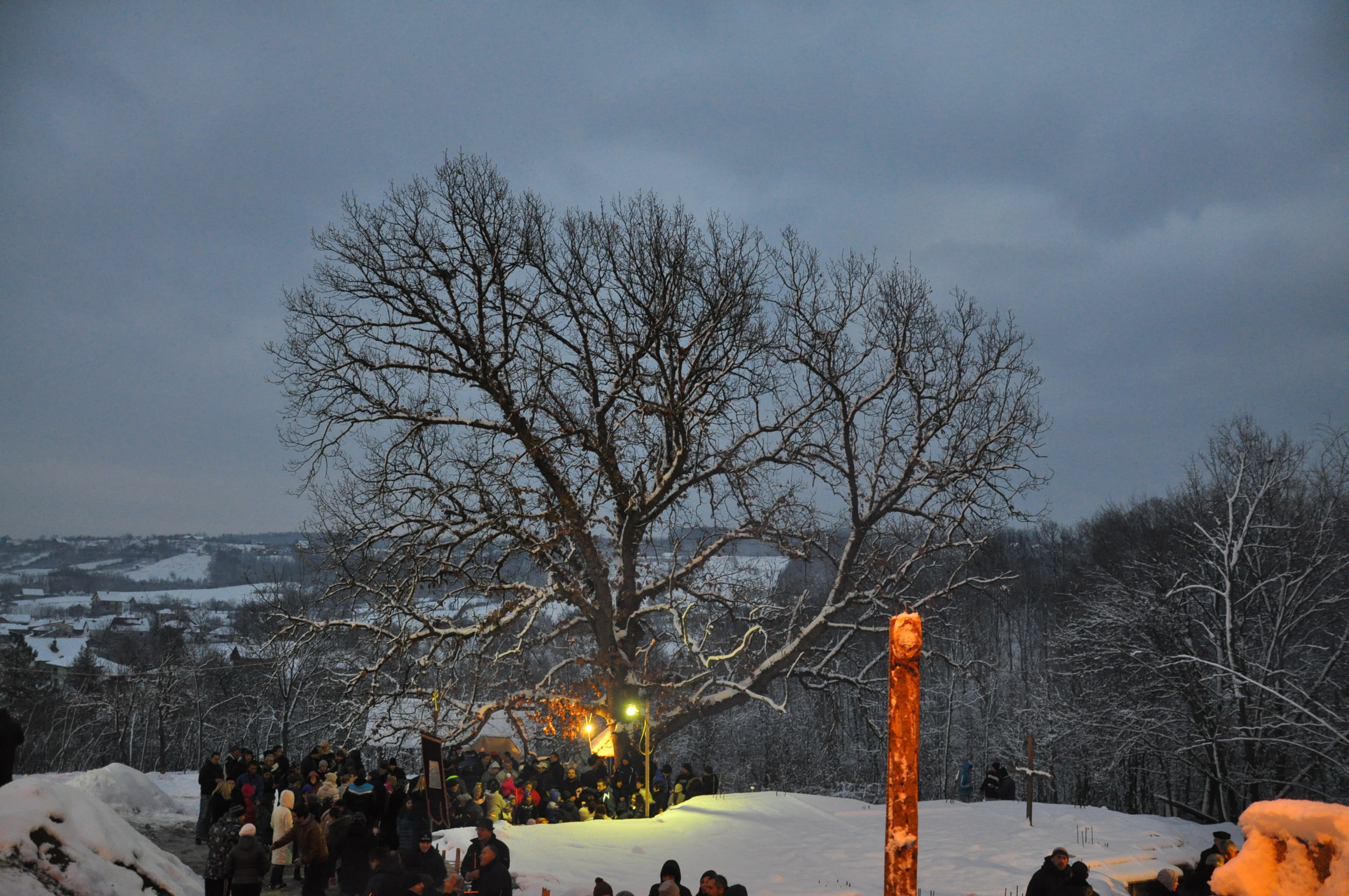
A religious ceremony in Kragujevac

The zapis plays an important role in rites connected with the festival known as krstonoše, meaning "crossbearers", which is publicly celebrated within the village to supplicate God for protection against destructive weather conditions, as well as to ensure a good harvest. Not all villages celebrate krstonoše on the same day, but it usually falls between Easter and the eve of St. Peter's Fast. Some villages have abandoned this festival. Krstonoše commences with villagers gathering at the church and forming a procession headed by a cross, an icon, and church banners. The procession walks a closed line around the settlement, encircling as much of the village's territory as possible, and then returns to the church. The girls and boys in the procession sing:

Од два класа шиник жита.
Од две гиџе чабар вина.

Out of two ears—a peck of grain.
Out of two vines—a cask of wine.

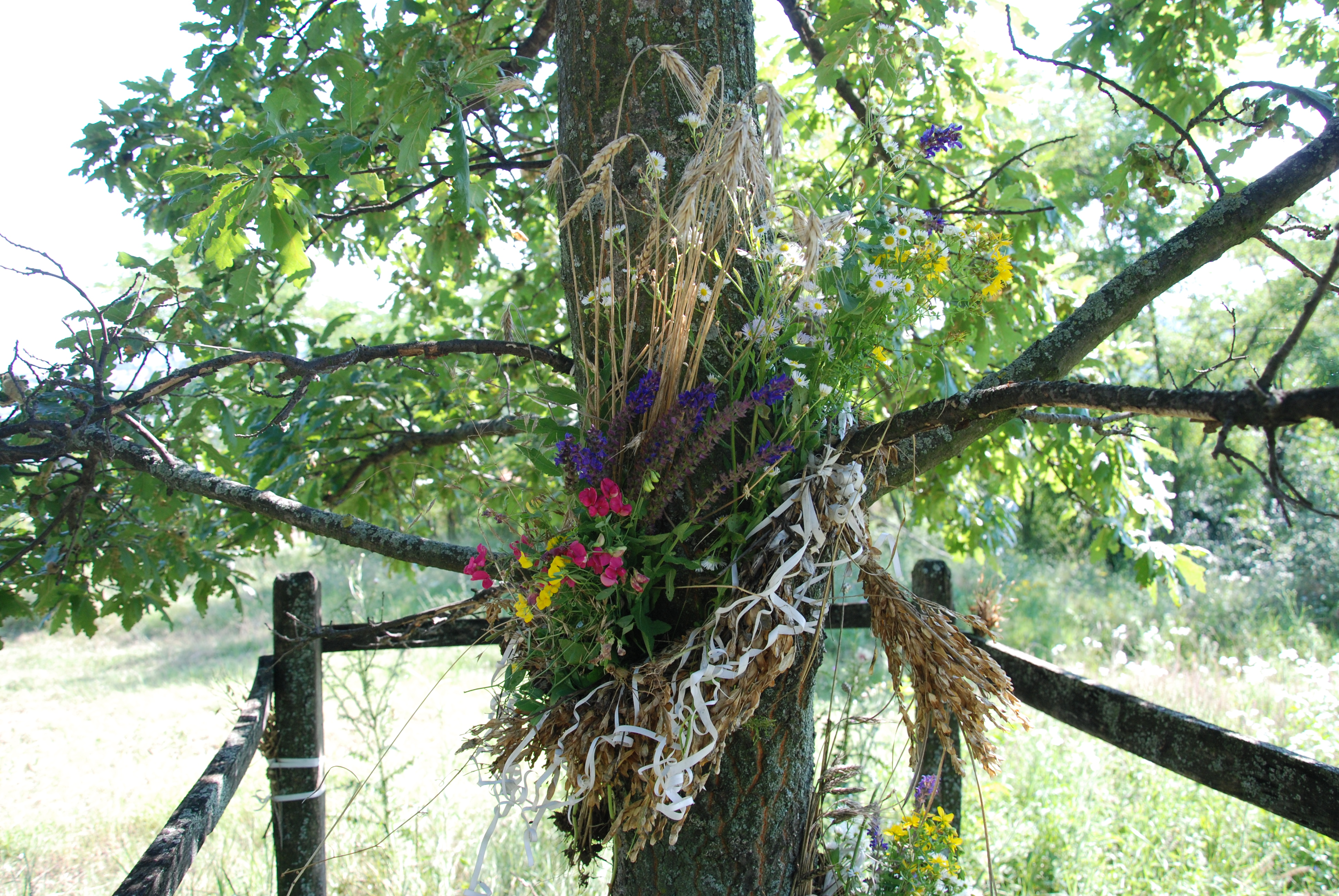
A young oak tree in a village near Kragujevac

On its way, the procession stops by each zapis and at some crossroads, where the priest chants prayers. The cross inscribed in the zapis's bark is renewed, and the tree is censed. In eastern Serbia, a small hole is bored into the trunk and filled with cooking oil and incense. The service on this festival is held under the crown of the main zapis, or in the church after the procession returns. During the service, the priest and the man elected for the host of the krstonoše hold together a round loaf of bread, rotate it three times counterclockwise, and break it into two halves. One half is given to the priest and the other to the man who will host the following year's krstonoše. A feast for the participants in the procession may be prepared under the main zapis and they may also dance the kolo there. A sheеp used to be sacrificed under the tree so that its blood spilled on the trunk and roots.

Some villages and hamlets in Serbia also observe a festival commemorating a disaster that has befallen the settlement, such as a flood, fire, or lightning strike. The festival is called the zavetina, the name being derived from the noun zavet, meaning vow. The service on the zavetina may be held in the shelter of the zapis. In settlements without a church, ceremonies such as weddings and baptisms were conducted under the crown of the zapis. People with health problems used to leave their clothes on the tree by night, believing this would help restore their health. In the regions of Pek and Zvižd, in eastern Serbia, a fire used to be built under the tree on the eve of Great Lent. In Gruža, money was lent under the zapis.

== Origin and similar traditions ==
In his study on the cult of trees among ancient Serbs, ethnologist Veselin Čajkanović states that the zapis is inherited from Slavic paganism, in which it had been used as a temple. Prayers and sacrifices were offered under the crown of the zapis, as in a temple. A zapis is primarily selected from oaks, the trees associated with Perun—the thunder god of the ancient Slavic religion. A Serbian legend relates the story of a king who always prayed to God under a pear tree rather than in a church, saying, "the pear tree is my church." His prayers were so effective that he eventually became a saint.

A reverence towards trees, similar to that extended upon the zapis, has also been recorded in North Macedonia. During Easter, in the region of Gevgelija, the Eucharist was once given to selected pear trees. Each was surrounded with icons, after which a priest read from a Gospel facing the tree, sprinkled it with holy water, and then put the consecrated bread under its bark. In other areas, there was a custom of placing a cross, a fireplace, and a table made of stone by a tree on a hillock near a river or lake.

== See also ==
- Badnjak, a log ceremonially burned by Serb families on domestic hearths on Christmas Eve
- Krsna Slava, a Serb family's patronal feast day celebrated
