= Badnjak (Serbian) =

Tree branch or entire tree that is central to Serbian Christmas celebrations

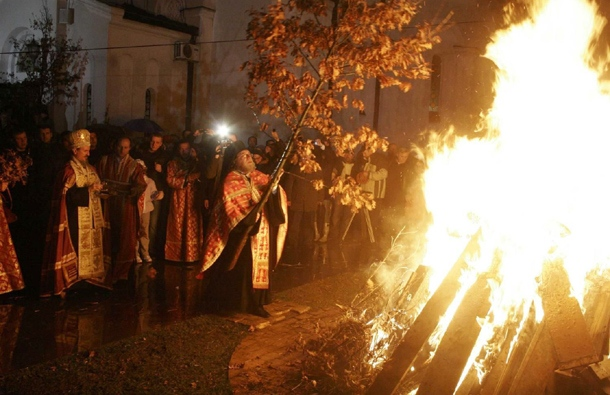
A Serbian Orthodox priest places the badnjak on a fire during a Christmas Eve celebration at the Temple of Saint Sava in Belgrade

The badnjak (Serbian Cyrillic: бадњак, pronounced [bǎdɲaːk]), also called veseljak (весељак, pronounced [ʋɛˈsɛ̌ʎaːk], literally "the one who brings joy" in Serbian), is a tree branch or entire tree that is central to Serbian Christmas celebrations. It is placed on a fire on Christmas Eve (Note: Christmas Eve does not fall on the same day for the Serbs as for the Western Christians, although they celebrate it on the same date—24 December. This is because the Serbian Orthodox Church uses the Julian calendar rather than the Gregorian used in the West. Since 1900, the Julian calendar is 13 days behind the Gregorian calendar, and this difference will remain until 2100. During this period, 24 December in the Julian calendar—Christmas Eve for the Serbs—corresponds to 6 January of the following year in the Gregorian calendar.) and its branches are later brought home by worshipers. The tree from which the badnjak is cut, preferably a young, straight and undamaged oak, is ceremonially felled early on the morning of Christmas Eve. The felling, preparation, bringing in, and laying on the fire, are surrounded by elaborate rituals, with many regional variations. The burning of the log is accompanied by prayers that the coming year brings food, happiness, love, luck, and riches. The log burns on throughout Christmas Day, when the first visitor strikes it with a poker or a branch to make sparks fly, while wishing that the family's happiness and prosperity be as abundant as the sparks. As most Serbs today live in towns and cities, the badnjak is often symbolically represented by a cluster of oak twigs with brown leaves attached, with which the home is decorated on Christmas Eve.

Since the early 20th century, the Serbian badnjak tradition has also been celebrated more publicly. Before World War I, soldiers of the Kingdom of Serbia developed the custom of laying a badnjak on a fire near their sleeping areas. In the succeeding Kingdom of Yugoslavia, the military badnjak ceremony was further elaborated and standardized in army service regulations, but the tradition ended at the outbreak of World War II.

Since the early 1990s, the Serbian Orthodox Church has, together with local communities, organized public celebrations on Christmas Eve in which the badnjak plays a central role. Parishioners festively cut the sapling to be used as the badnjak and take it to their church, where it is consecrated by a priest before being ceremonially placed on a fire pit in the churchyard. The festive kindling of the badnjak commemorates the fire that—according to Serbian folk tradition—the shepherds of Bethlehem built in the cave where Jesus was born, to warm the Baby Jesus, Mary, and Joseph throughout the night.

The badnjak may also be seen as a symbol of the cross upon which Christ was crucified, the warmth of its fire symbolizing the salvation which, in the Christian belief, the crucifixion made possible for mankind.

== Pre-Christian Origins ==
Scholars regard the tradition as inherited from the old Slavic religion. They interpret the badnjak as an incarnation of the spirit of vegetation, and as a divinity who dies by burning to be reborn, to whom sacrifices and prayers were offered for the fertility of fields, along with health and happiness of the family. The burning symbolized sunshine, securing the vitalizing power of the sun in the coming year.

Other South Slavic peoples have similar traditions, and the custom that a family brings a log into the house and burns it on Christmas Eve has also been recorded in other parts of Europe.

== Family celebration ==
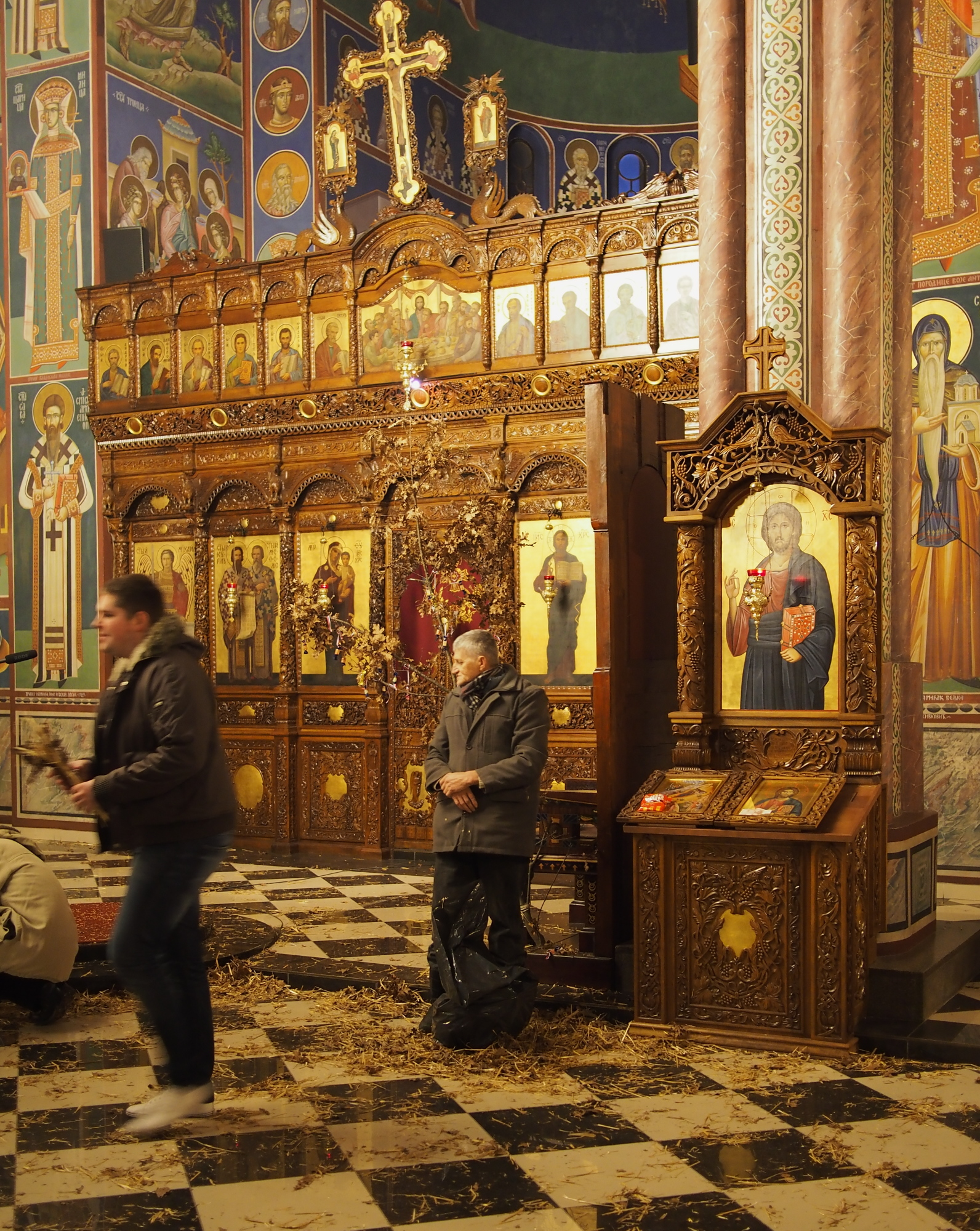
Receiving a badnjak in church

=== Felling and preparing ===
Traditionally, the badnjak ceremony begins on Christmas Eve, but there are many regional variations surrounding the details. Early in the morning the head of each family, usually accompanied by several male relatives, selects and fells the tree from which a log will be cut for their household. The group announces its departure by firing guns or small celebratory mortars called prangija.

The Turkey oak is the most popular species of tree selected in most regions, but other oaks are also chosen. Beech, pear, quince, hornbeam, and plum trees are used in eastern Serbia, although less frequently than oak trees. In some areas of Montenegrin Littoral where oaks do not grow, olives, bay laurels, elms, or strawberry trees are used instead. Young, straight, and undamaged specimens are preferred. The badnjak may be more valued if it is felled stealthily in someone else's rather than in one's own woods.

Generally, each household prepares one badnjak, although more are cut in some regions. Depending on the local custom, Orthodox Montenegrins and Montenegrin Serbs may fell two, three, an arbitrary number greater than two, or the number equal to the male members of household plus one. The latter means that each of the males has a log associated with him, with the thickest log representing the head of household and the thinnest linked to the family's prosperity. If there is only one man in the household, three rather than two logs are prepared. The logs may be cut from different species of tree.

In parts of the Bay of Kotor, each household prepares four sets, as they are burned there not only on Christmas Eve, but also on the eves of New Year's Day, Epiphany, and the Feast of Saint Sava. In Grbalj, south-west of Kotor, the number of the logs is equal to the number of people in the household. A terebinth is cut down for the badnjak associated with the woman of the house, called the badnjačica ([badˈɲatʃitsa]), meaning she-badnjak. The same term is also used in other areas where only a pair of oak logs is cut, in which case badnjačica refers to the smaller of the two. In Resava, the badnjačica is prepared from an Italian oak, and the badnjak from a Turkey oak. In Zagarač, central Montenegro, both of the logs may be cut from the same tree if it is tall enough, the badnjačica then coming from the upper, thinner part of the trunk. The pair is in some regions joined by a third log called the badnjačić—the child-badnjak.

Although young and thin trees are usually used for the badnjak, in northern Dalmatia's region of Bukovica two relatively thick logs with diameters of 30 to 50 centimeters (12 to 20 inches) are prepared, plus one thinner log (called trinity). In other areas dry oak branches are collected from the ground, and used instead of a log.

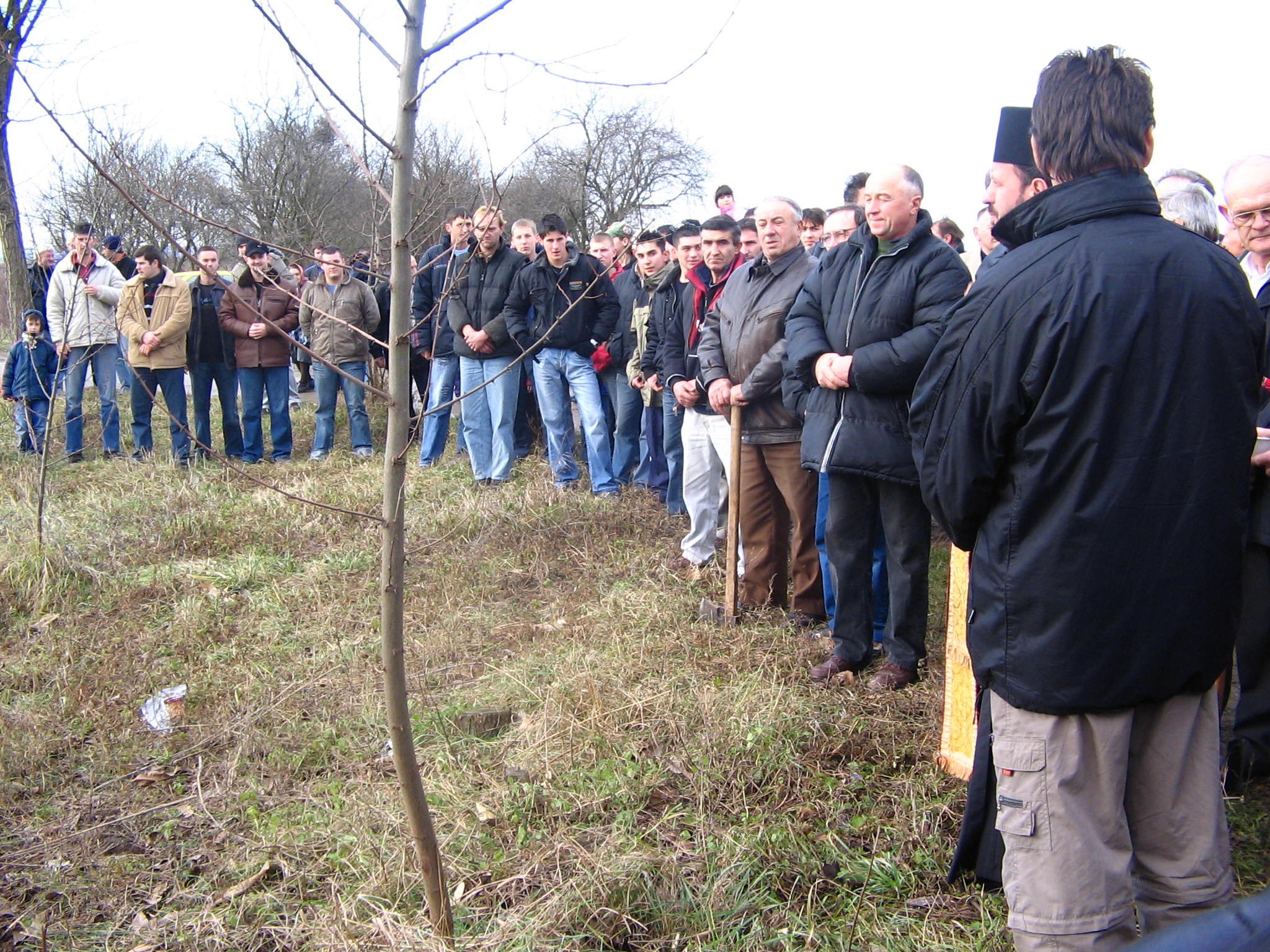
Public cutting of the badnjak in Tovariševo

When the head of household finds a suitable tree, he stands in front of it facing east. After throwing grain at the tree, he greets it with the words "Good morning and happy Christmas Eve to you", makes the Sign of the Cross, says a prayer, and kisses the tree. He may also explain to the badnjak why it will be cut: "I have come to you to take to my home, to be my faithful helper to every progress and improvement, in the house, in the pen, in the field, and in every place." He then cuts it slantwise on its eastern side, using an axe. Some men put gloves on before they start to cut the tree, and from then on never touch the badnjak with their bare hands. The tree should fall to the east, unhindered by surrounding trees. It must not be left half-cut, as then it will curse the house of the man. In some regions, if the tree is not cut down after the third blow of the axe, then it must be pulled and twisted until its trunk breaks. The resulting badnjak has a so-called "beard", the part of the trunk at which it broke off from the base of the tree. In Šumadija, half of a circular loaf of bread is left on the stump, the other half being eaten on the way back home. In Zagarač, the stump is covered with moss or dry leaves, and it will be visited again in spring: the stump sprouting through the cover is an omen of good luck and prosperity.

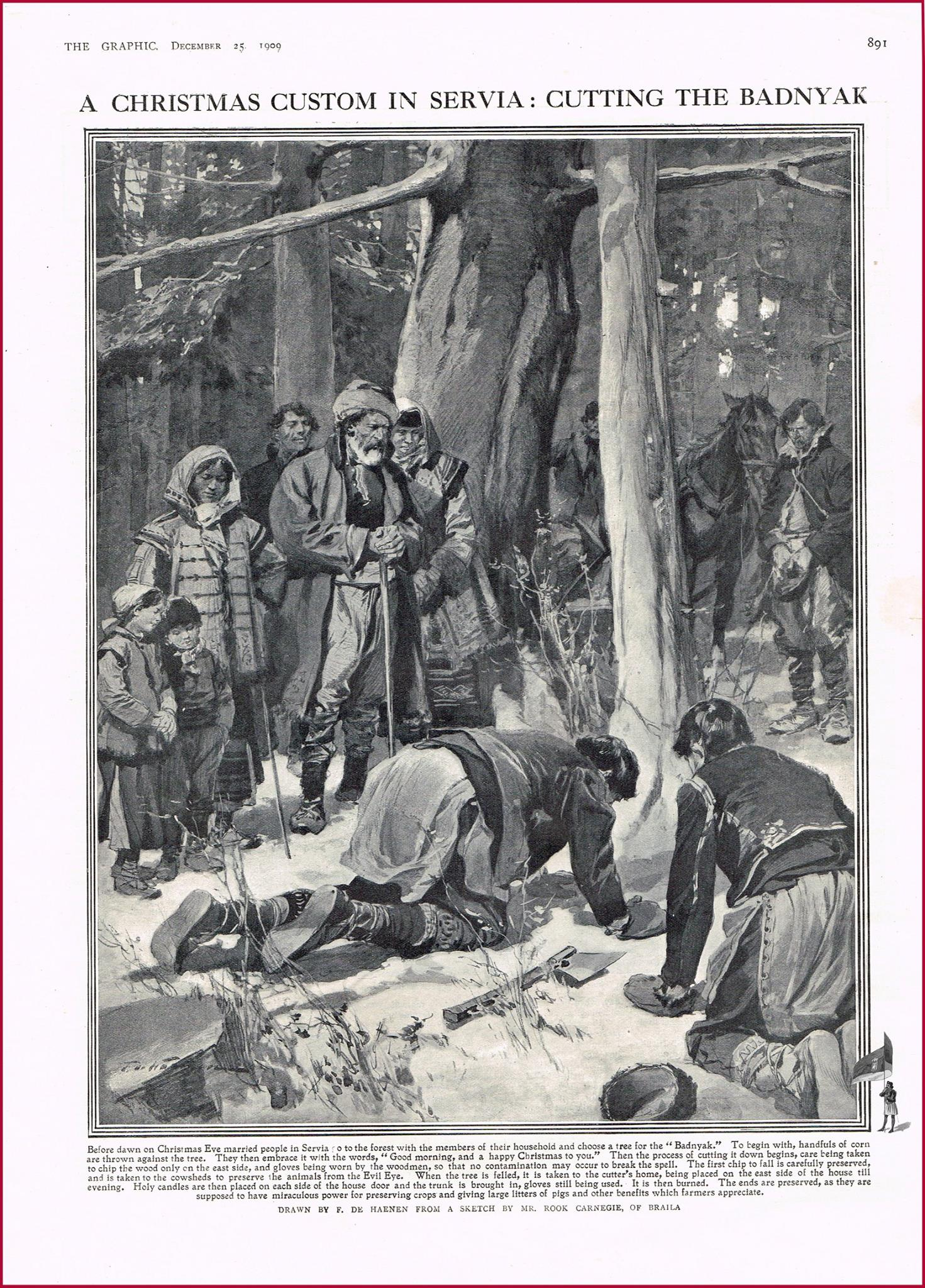
An illustration in The Graphic showing the cutting of the badnjak, 1909.

The first splinter from the tree is taken home and placed where prosperity is especially desired, such as beside the beehives, in the hen roost, or between milk basins in the dairy room, in the hope that the coming year's kaymak will clot to form thick layers in the basins. It may also be placed beneath some baker's yeast, so that the prosperity of the household may grow like yeast. In Semberija, a piece of the splinter is put in the dough for the česnica, a round loaf of bread prepared specially for Christmas dinner. This is done "because of bees", as the reason is traditionally termed.

The top of the felled tree is removed, leaving the badnjak of such a length that allows it to be carried on a man's shoulder, up to about 2.5 meters (8.2 ft) long. Its branches may be lopped off, or not, depending on the local custom. Once in the home, each badnjak is leaned vertically against the house beside the entrance door. In Montenegrin Littoral, each should be adorned with leaved bay laurel, olive, juniper, and rosemary twigs, which are tied to the trunk's top, middle, and base with ivy or red silken or woolen threads. In parts of eastern Serbia and Kosovo the badnjak is wrapped in a man's shirt.

In the Rađevina region of western Serbia, centered around the town of Krupanj, the badnjak prepared for each household is cut into three logs, the most important of which is the dozemak—the log that comes from the part of the trunk that grew nearest to the ground. In Resava, Levač, Temnić, and Jadar of Serbia, as well as in Ozren and Romanija of Bosnia, the badnjak is cut into three logs associated respectively with the men, the women, and the children.

=== Bringing in and burning ===
Burning of the badnjak

In the evening, a man of the family brings their badnjak into the house. If there is more than one badnjak, the thickest of them is regarded as the main one, and is brought in first. Stepping across the threshold, right foot first, the man greets his gathered family with the words "Good evening and happy Christmas Eve to you." The woman of the house greets him back, saying "May God give you well-being, and may you have good luck", or "Good luck to you, and together with you for many years to come [may we be]", or similar, before throwing grain from a sieve at the man and the badnjak he carries. In the clan of Kuči, the woman touches the "beard" of the main badnjak with a whole loaf of bread. In Montenegro, two women holding lit candles stand on either side of the house door as the badnjak is carried in.

Upon entering the house the man approaches the fireplace, called ognjište ([ˈɔɡɲiːʃtɛ])—the hearth of an ognjište is similar to a campfire, in that it has no vertical surround. He lays the badnjak down on the fire and moves it a little forward, to summon prosperity for the household. Any other logs are brought in by other males and laid on the fire parallel or perpendicular to the first. In a family with the tradition of burning the badnjak and badnjačica, they are laid one across the other; the males then kiss the former, and the females the latter. In Bukovica the two thicker logs are placed side by side, and the thinner one (trinity) is placed in parallel on top. In 19th-century Herzegovina, families with large houses would load their logs onto three or four pairs of oxen, which were then led into the house. The logs were unloaded and laid on the fire, and the oxen driven out through the back door.

Immediately after the badnjak has been brought in, or immediately before in some places, an armful of straw is spread over the floor. The straw is usually brought in with the same greetings and throwing of grain as the badnjak. The person spreading it may imitate a hen clucking to call her chicks, "Kvo, kvo, kvo", with the family's children imitating chicks, "Piju, piju, piju", while they pick at the straw. In Čečava, northern Bosnia, the children then lie down on the straw, before closing their eyes and picking a stalk with their lips: the child that picked the longest stalk will supposedly be the luckiest in the following year. In the Bay of Kotor, the ceremony is accompanied by the words "Kuda slama, tuda slava"—"Whither straw, thither celebration." A common custom is to scatter a handful of walnuts over the straw. It will be collected and taken out of the house on the morning of the second day after Christmas. Some of the straw may be set aside and used in apotropaic practices in the coming year.

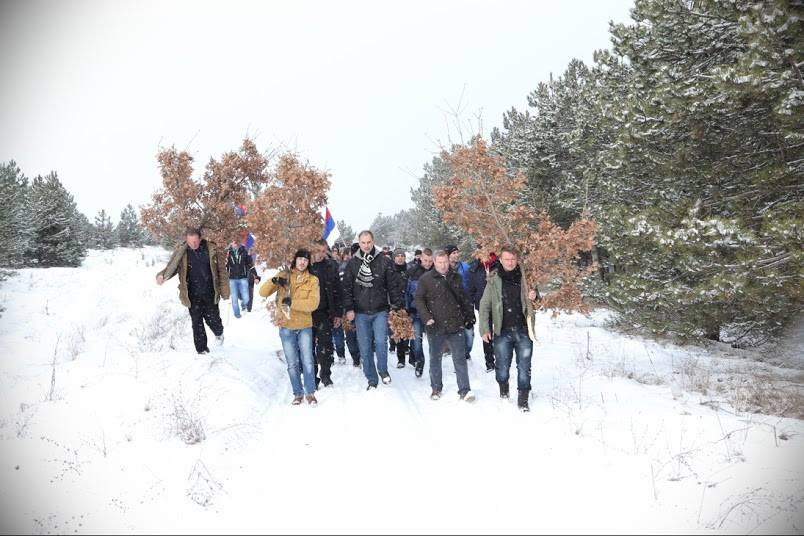
Macedonian Serbs bringing their badnjaks home

The thicker end of the log, the end that was nearest to the tree's roots, may have a special significance. In Montenegro it is called the head of the badnjak; the main log is laid on the fire with its head pointing east. In central Serbia, the badnjak is laid with its thicker end sticking out from the ognjište. The household's shepherds would kiss over it to ensure an abundance of lambs in the coming year. In Gruža it is coated with honey which is then licked by children. At the side of ognjište where the thicker end is situated, the family may place a plowshare, a round loaf of bread, a glove filled with wheat, sugar, or a sieve containing grain, honey, cakes, wine, salt, prunes, walnuts, and apples. The cut surface of the thicker end is in Čečava kissed by all the family members after the badnjak is laid on the fire.

The head of the household takes a jug of wine and pours some on the badnjak; in some regions, he may strew wheat grains over the logs. He then proposes a toast: "Grant, O God, that there be health and joy in this home, that our grain and grapevines yield well, that children be born healthy to us, that our property increase in the field, pen, and barn!" or, "Hail, badnjak, veseljak! I give you wheat and wine, and you give me every good thing and peace!" or similar. The name veseljak, literally "jovial one", is used along with badnjak in some areas. The head drinks a draught of wine from the jug, after which it is passed to other members of household. In the clan of Kuči, wine is poured on the "beard" of the badnjak, and then a little girl sits for a moment on the log—for the well-being of the cattle. Christmas Eve dinner follows, which traditionally includes a round loaf of unleavened bread, beans, fish, walnuts, honey, and red wine. The bread is not cut with a knife, but broken with hands.

The badnjak should not be jumped over or trodden upon, and blowing on its fire is avoided. It should not be moved when about to burn through, lest the log break at the place most consumed by the fire, which is usually strongest at the center of the fireplace; the separation of the log should be a result of the fire only. None of the family members should fall asleep before the log splits, otherwise some of them may die in the coming year, without warning.

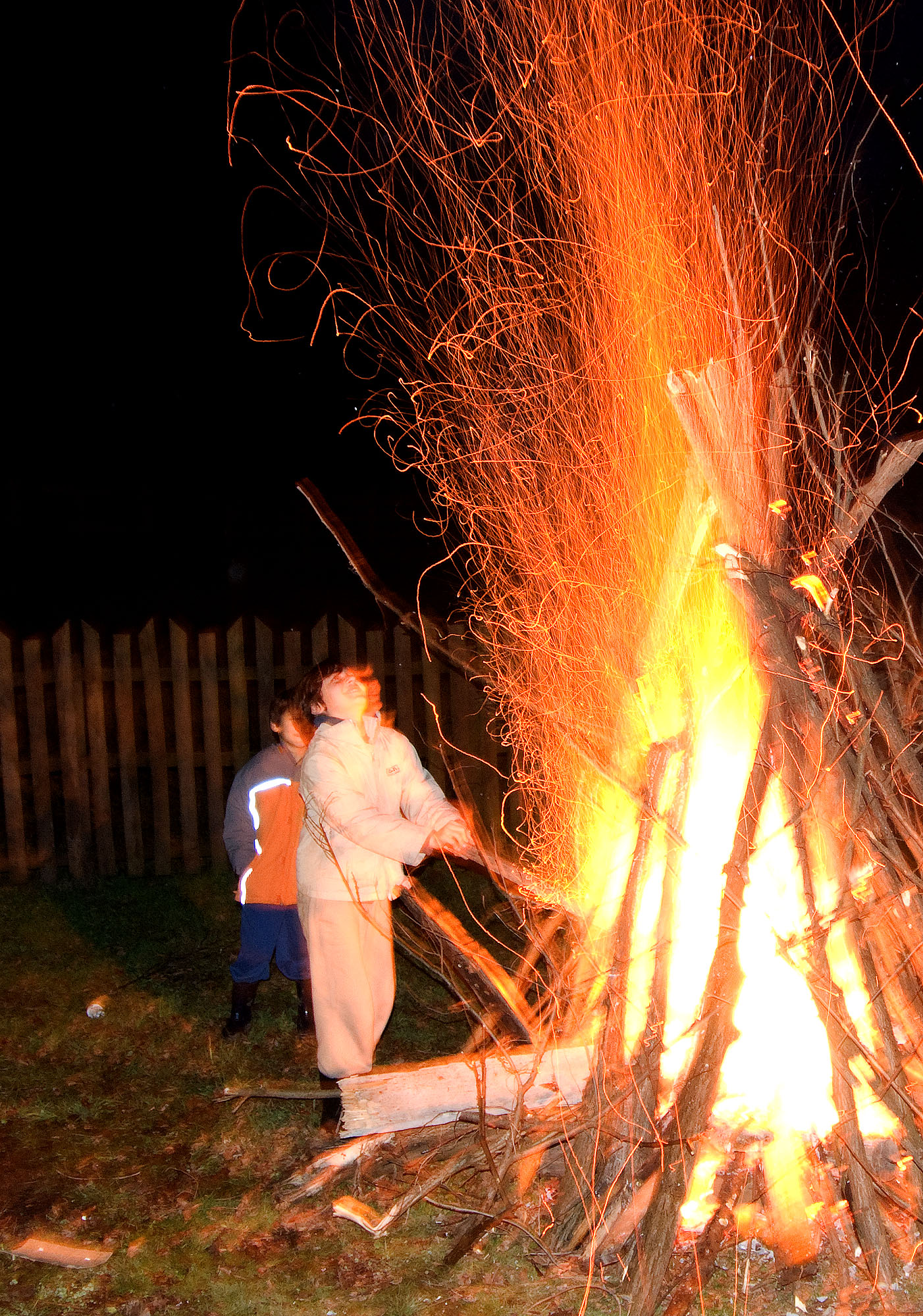
Burning of the badnjak in Jablanica

The moment when the badnjak burns through may be marked with festivities, such as the log being kissed by the head of household, and wine being poured over it accompanied by toasts. A reward may be given to the family member who was the first to notice the event, and in the past the men would go outside and fire their guns in celebration. There is a special verb preveseliti used instead of the common pregoreti to express "to burn through" when referring to the badnjak, which has the same root as the noun veseljak. Once the log has burnt through, some families let the fire go out, while in others the men keep watch in shifts during the night to keep the badnjak burning. Once the badnjak has burnt through, the thicker end is often taken out of the fire and used according to the local custom. It may be carried around the beehives, extinguished, and placed between the branches of a young plum or apple tree. The men may make crosses from it and put them under the eaves, on the fields, meadows, vineyards, and apiaries, so that the coming year may be happy and fruitful. It may also be set aside for next Christmas Eve, to be placed on the fire immediately before the new badnjak, as a symbol of continuity. In Kosovo, a part of the badnjak is preserved and burned again on New Years Day and Epiphany.

The badnjak burns on through Christmas Day, whether rekindled or kept burning from the Eve. The first visit the family receives that day is considered important, comparable to New Years Day first-footing in the British Isles. The family may choose someone, usually a young male, to be their first visitor, known as a polaznik, before the arrival of whom no outsider is allowed to enter the house. Early on the morning of Christmas Day he steps into the house, right foot first, and greets the family with "Christ is Born", to which they reply "Truly He is Born." The polaznik then approaches the ognjište and repeatedly strikes the burning log with a poker or a branch to make sparks fly. At the same time he utters a wish that the happiness and prosperity of the household be as abundant as the sparks:

Koliko varnica, toliko sreće u ovoj kući.
Koliko varnica, toliko u domaćinskom džepu novaca.
Koliko varnica, toliko u toru ovaca.
Koliko varnica, toliko prasadi i jaganjaca.
Koliko varnica, toliko gusaka i piladi,
a najviše zdravlja i veselja.

Translation:

How many sparks, that much happiness in this house.
How many sparks, that much money in the household head's pocket.
How many sparks, that many sheep in the pen.
How many sparks, that many pigs and lambs.
How many sparks, that many geese and chickens,
and most of all, health and joy.

The wording of this well-wishing may vary, but its intention is always the same, to invoke happiness and prosperity. The polaznik will then throw a coin into the fire before being presented with a round loaf of bread, the traditional gift for the polaznik, usually accompanied by some other present. The custom to use a domestic animal as a polaznik was kept in some regions until the first half of the 20th century. In Rađevina, the head of the household would lead a sheep into the house, place it between the ognjište and himself, and utter the wishes while striking the badnjak with a branch cut from it, before saying: "We passed one fire, we are not afraid of another." His wife would then kiss him over the sheep after saying "may the ewes kiss the lambs as we kiss each other."

Embers of the badnjak may be used for divination in Jadar. The number of these equal to the sum of grain and livestock sorts grown by the family are taken out from the ognjište and placed on the česnica. Each of the sorts is associated with its own ember on that loaf. The sort whose ember retains its glow longer than the others should be the most productive in the coming year. The log sparking by itself presages a rich harvest of honey. Cooled coals of the badnjak may be placed between the branches of fruit trees; the young trees may be provided also with twigs from the badnjak. Its ash may be spread over the fields and mixed with fodder. Some of the ash may be set aside to be taken with water as a remedy for headache. There are also numerous other regional practices connected with the badnjak.

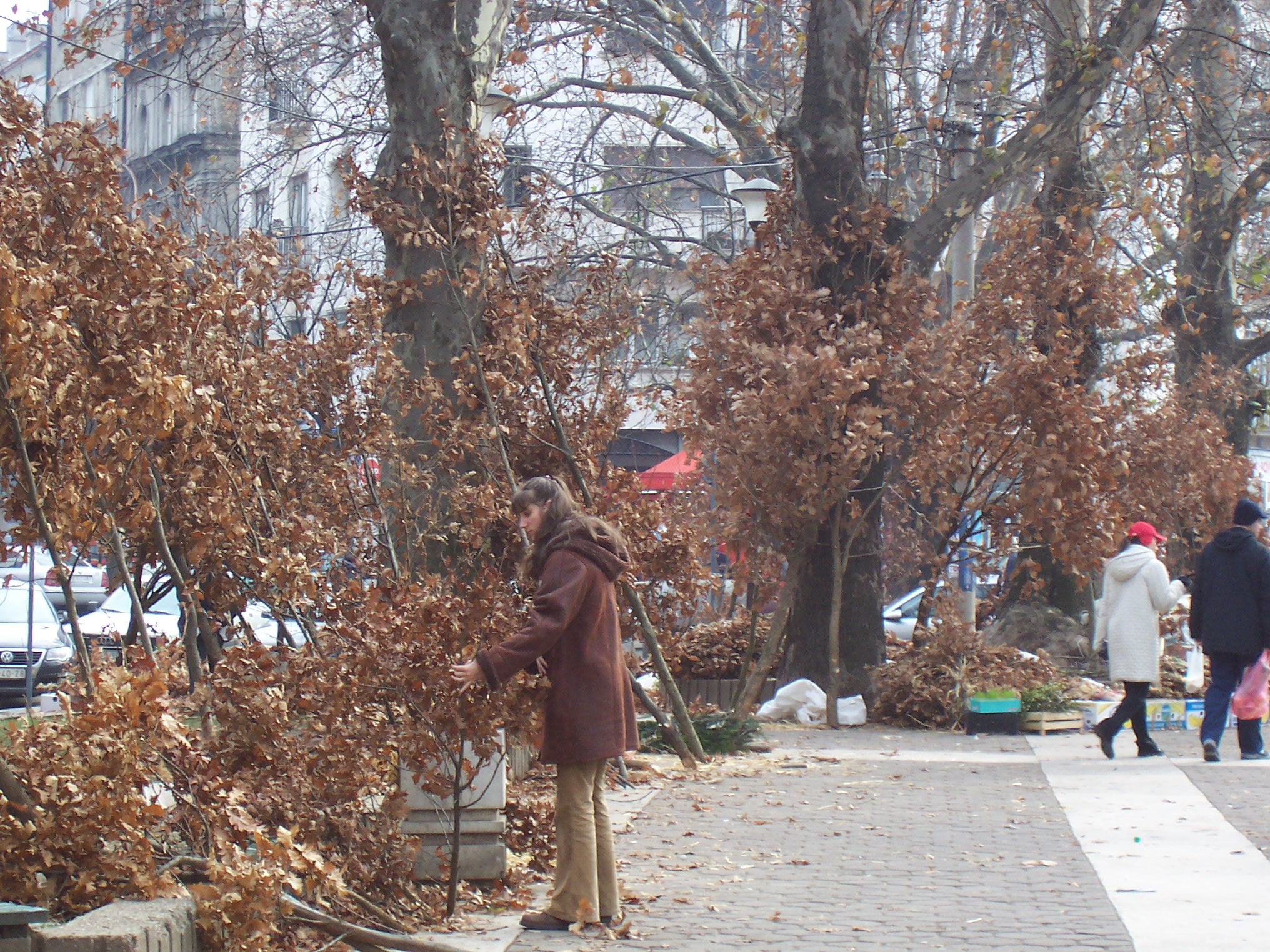
Badnjaks on sale at Kalenić Market, Belgrade

These ancient traditions have modern, reduced versions. Modern houses usually have no ognjište on which to burn a badnjak, but it may be symbolically represented by several oak twigs, some of which are burnt in a wood-burning kitchen stove and the others placed beside it. Some people chop the badnjak into shorter logs so that they can be put into the hearth and burnt. The most prevalent custom, however, is to place a cluster of oak twigs, with their brown leaves still attached, in whichever location in the home the family feels is appropriate. This cluster is also called the badnjak, and it is usually kept in the home until next Christmas Eve. For the convenience of those living in towns and cities, such little badnjaks can be bought at marketplaces or distributed in churches. In a common arrangement, the cluster of oak twigs is bound together with twigs of European Cornel (Note: In Serbian folklore, European Cornel is regarded as an embodiment of health. There is a saying for a healthy person: zdrav kao dren, "as healthy as Cornel".) and several stalks of straw.

The laying of a badnjak on the fire was considered the least a Serbian family could do to show their devotion to Serbian tradition. In Njegoš's epic poem The Mountain Wreath, the plot of which takes place in 18th-century Montenegro, Voivode Batrić urges converts to Islam to return to Christianity and Serbdom: "[...] Lay the Serbian Christmas-log [badnjak] on the fire, paint the Easter eggs various colours, observe with care the Lent and Christmas fasts. As for the rest, do what your heart desires!" Petrović-Njegoš describes the holiday atmosphere that surrounds the burning badnjak on Christmas Eve through the words of Abbot Stefan, one of the mains characters of The Mountain Wreath:

Vatra plama bolje nego igda,
prostrta je slama ispred ognja,
prekršćeni na ognju badnjaci;
puške puču, vrte se peciva,
gusle gude, a kola pjevaju,
s unučađu đedovi igraju,
po tri pasa vrte se u kola,
sve bi reka jednogodišnici;
sve radošću divnom naravnjeno.
A što mi se najviše dopada,
što svačemu treba nazdraviti!

Translation:

The fire's burning brighter than ever,
the straw is spread in front of the fire,
The badnjaks are laid on the fire crossways;
the rifles crack, and roasts on spits do turn,
the gusle plays, and the dancers sing,
grandfathers dance with their young grandchildren,
in the kolo join three generations,
it seems they're almost of the same age;
everything is filled with bright mirth and joy.
But what I like best of all, so help me,
one has to drink a toast to everything!

== Public celebration ==
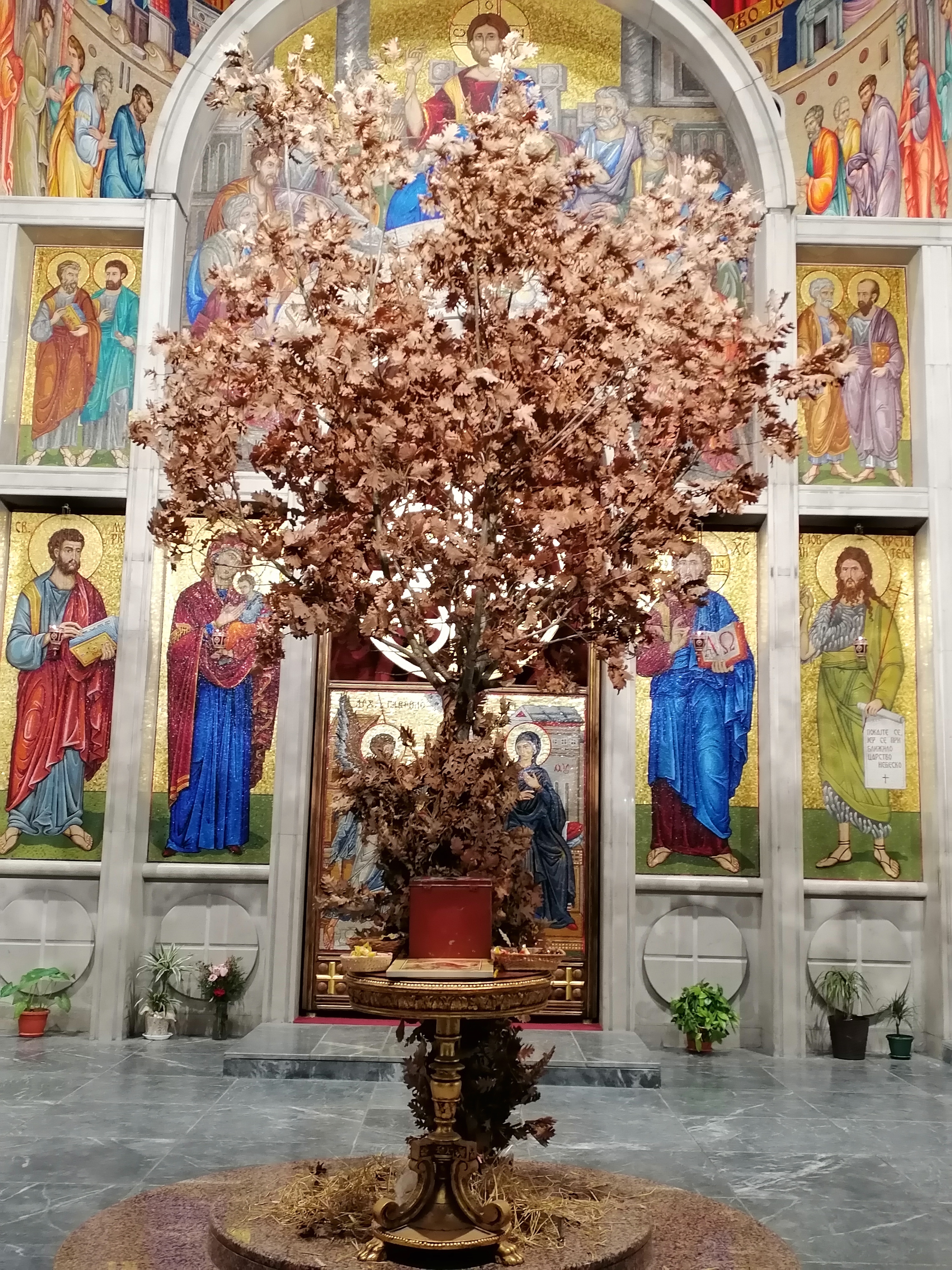
A badnjak in St. Mark's Church, Belgrade

The badnjak ceremony, originally performed only within the family, became a more public celebration. A custom developed before World War I in the Kingdom of Serbia to lay the badnjak on a fire built in military barracks, so that the soldiers stationed there over Christmas could share in the holiday atmosphere. In the succeeding Kingdom of Yugoslavia, the military badnjak ceremony was standardized in army service regulations. On Christmas Eve, under the command of a specially appointed officer, the representatives of military units of a garrison formed a festive procession on horses, accompanied with music. Members of citizens' associations and other civilians of the garrison town usually joined the procession as it proceeded to the nearest wood to collect the badnjak. They felled a set number of trees, dedicated respectively to the Royal Palace, the military command of the town, the respective commands of units of the garrison, its oldest officer, and its officers' assembly house. The procession brought the trees to the barracks, in whose yard an open fire was built. The garrison commander then placed the trees ceremonially on the fire, and gave an appropriate address.

More and more state institutions, private firms, organizations, and clubs joined the procession each year, and the event began to take on the character of a public holiday. During the 1930s, the laying of badnjak on the fire became a court ritual. It was performed, in the presence of the royal family, by representatives of the army in the Royal Palace's room with a fireplace. At the end of the 1930s in some parts of Yugoslavia, especially Vojvodina and Montenegro, the military badnjak ceremony was performed not in the barracks yard but in a square in the garrison town. An open fire was built, on which the badnjak was placed by an Orthodox priest in the presence of soldiers and citizens. This tradition, symbolizing the unity of state, church, and people, was ended by the outbreak of World War II.

Yugoslavia's socialist government suppressed or discouraged public religious celebrations until the early 1990s. Since then, the Serbian Orthodox Church has, together with local communities, organized public celebrations on Christmas Eve. There are typically three elements to such celebrations: the preparation, the ritual, and the festivity. The preparation consists of cutting down the oak sapling to be used as the badnjak, taking it to the church yard, and preparing drink and food for the assembled parishioners. The ritual includes Vespers, placing the badnjak on the open fire built in the church yard, blessing or consecrating the badnjak, and an appropriate program with songs and recitals. In some parishes they build the fire on which to burn the badnjak not in the church yard but at some other suitable location in their town or village. The festivity consists of gathering around the fire and socializing. Each particular celebration has its own specific traits however, reflecting the traditions of the local community.

The expedition to cut down the badnjak is the basic activity in the preparation part of the celebration. It can be performed by an individual, but it is usually a collective act accompanied by a festive procession that may include carriages and horsemen. After the tree to be used as the badnjak is cut down, it is adorned with straw, ribbons, oranges, apples, and sometimes with the Serbian flag. In some parishes more than one badnjak is used in the celebration, and a different tree is felled for each. Often bunches of leaved oak twigs are prepared to be distributed to the congregation gathered at the church. Each badnjak is festively taken to the church gate, often transported on carriages. The badnjak may be taken into the churchyard without any ceremony, or it may be followed by a procession, as is the case in parts of Republika Srpska and the Bay of Kotor.

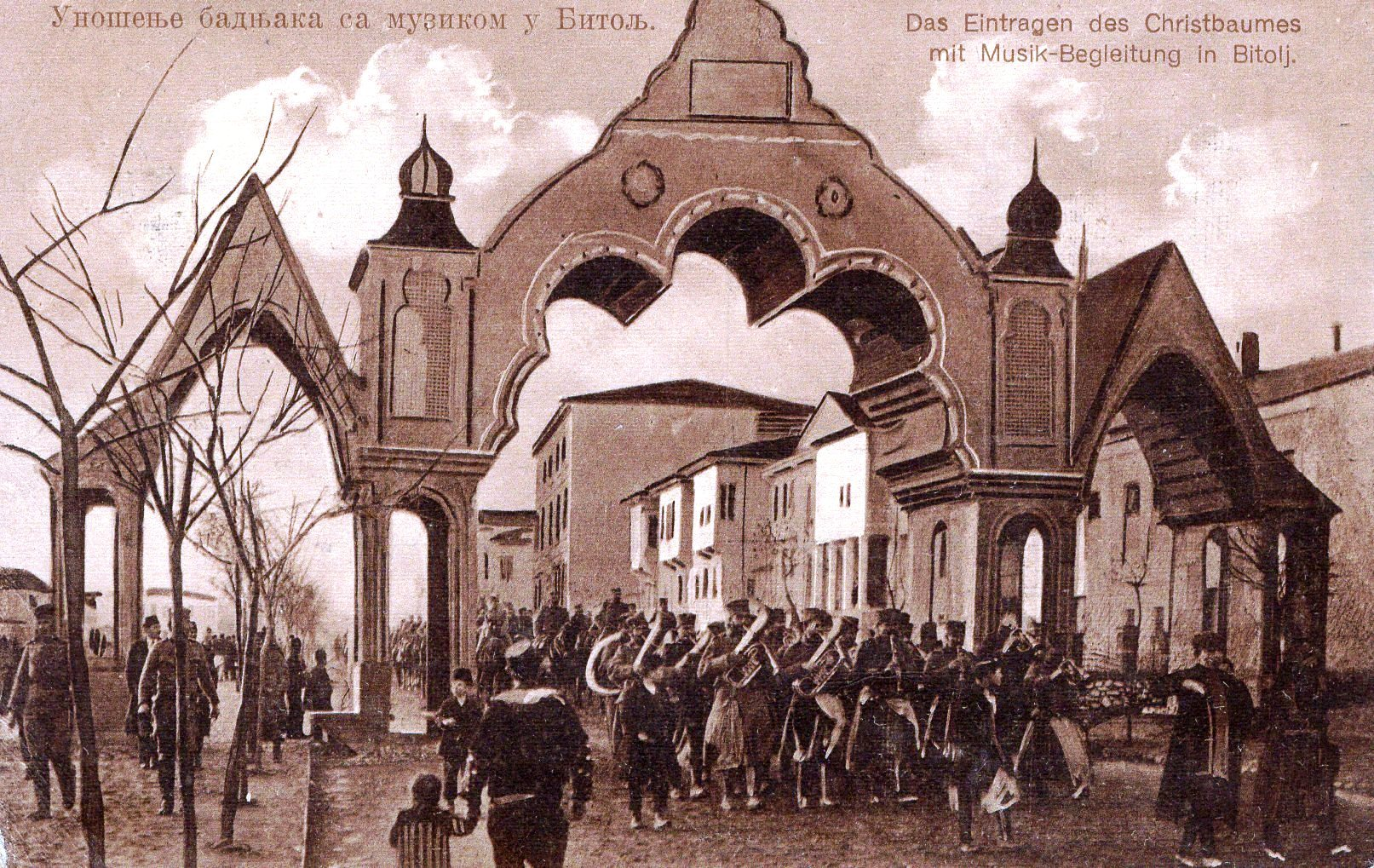
Ceremonial bringing of the badnjak into Bitola, 1917

The ritual is the central part of the celebration. Vespers vary from place to place with respect to the time of the beginning of the service, its length and structure. The laying of the badnjak on the fire usually comes after the service, and is done by a priest or by a respected parishioner. Before the burning, the tree may be processionally carried around the church. In the case of more than one badnjak, the trees are placed in the shape of a cross. The assembled devotees throw then into the fire their twig bunches, each representing a small badnjak. The consecration or blessing is performed by a priest: he strews wheat grains over the badnjak, censes it while singing the Troparion of the Nativity, and as he intones prayers, he pours wine and spreads honey on it. Instead of applying wine and honey, holy water may be sprinkled on the tree by dipping a bunch of basil into a bowl with the water. This rite is generally performed after the placing on the fire, although it may happen before, in which case the consecration may be performed in the church itself or in its yard.

After the ritual the priest delivers a short sermon, followed by the church choir singing Christmas songs; poems that praise the Nativity of Jesus may be recited. In Montenegro, decasyllable Serbian epics are sung to an accompaniment played on the gusle, a traditional Serbian bowed string instrument. The celebration ends with parishioners gathered around the fire, served with cooked rakia, wine, or tea, and the food allowed during the Nativity Fast. Parishioners may pick a twig from the badnjak and take it home to place in front of their icon, or at another appropriate location.

Although Serbian public religious celebrations, as those of other peoples, were discouraged in Socialist Yugoslavia until the early 1990s, they continued among Serbian Americans. The public badnjak ceremony was held in Serbian Orthodox parishes in the United States during that period.

== Interpretation ==
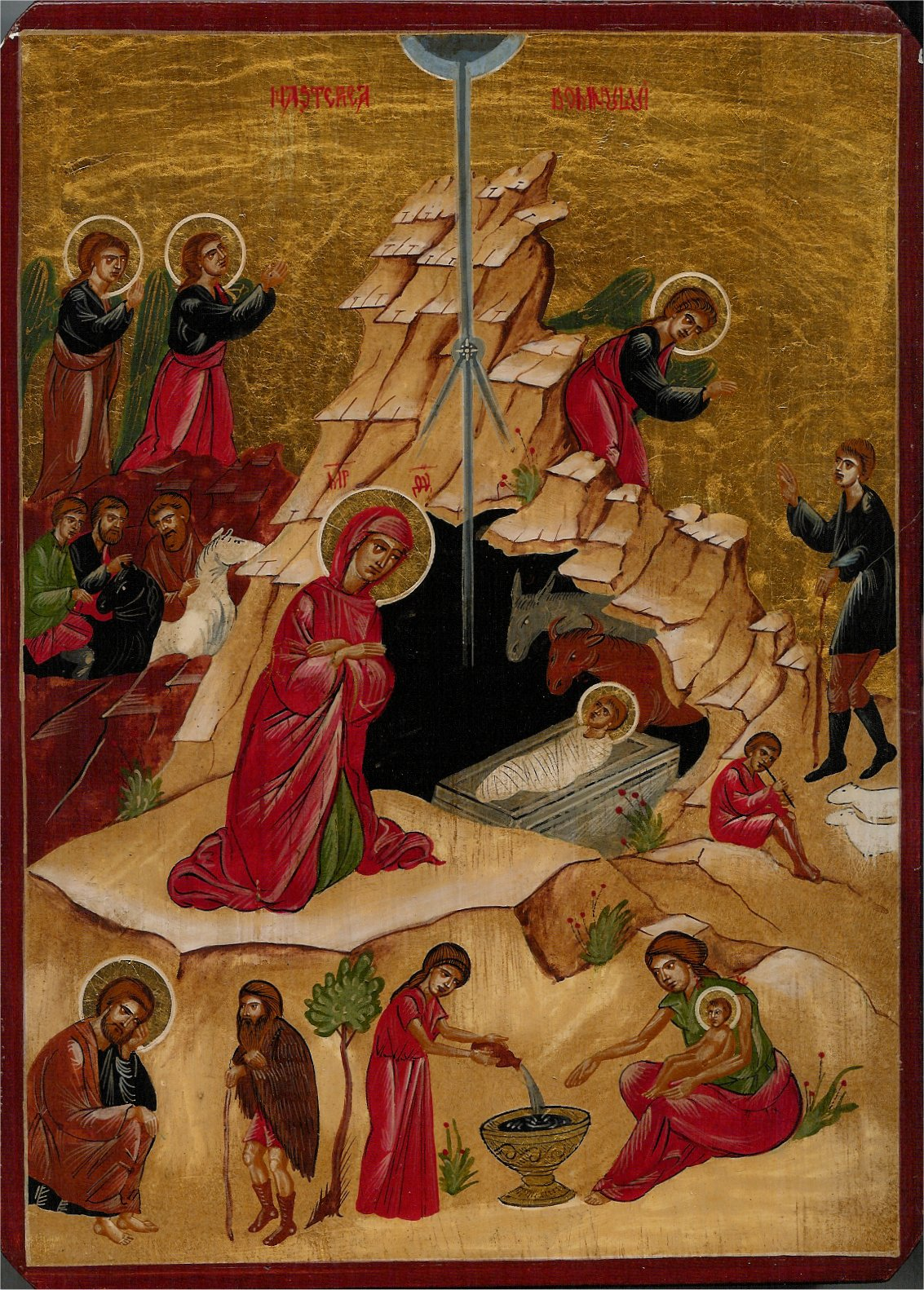
The icon of the Nativity. The Theotokos and the Christ Child, who lies in the manger in the cave, are at the center. Two shepherds are on the right, one of them sitting and playing music for his flock.

The origin of the badnjak is explained by the events surrounding the Nativity of Jesus. According to the Gospel of Luke 2:1–20, the Theotokos gave birth to Christ at Bethlehem, wrapped him in cloths and laid him in a manger. By Holy Tradition, the manger was located in a cave near that town. An angel of the Lord appeared to a group of shepherds who were keeping watch over their flock by night in that region, and told them that the Savior was born at Bethlehem. They went there and found the baby lying in the manger, as the angel described to them. By folk tradition, the shepherds brought firewood to the cave and built a fire to warm the newborn Christ and his mother throughout the night. The burning of the badnjak commemorates this event.

While blessing the badnjak, some priests chant the following prayer: "O Lord Jesus Christ, our God, who did plant the Tree of Life in paradise so that it might bestow upon us eternal blessedness, bless also now this tree which is a symbol of Thy cross and the Tree of Life in paradise, and which reminds us of Thy holy birth and of the logs which the shepherds of Bethlehem kindled to warm themselves when they came to worship Thee, the divine infant, and thereby prefigured Thy salvation-bearing cross."

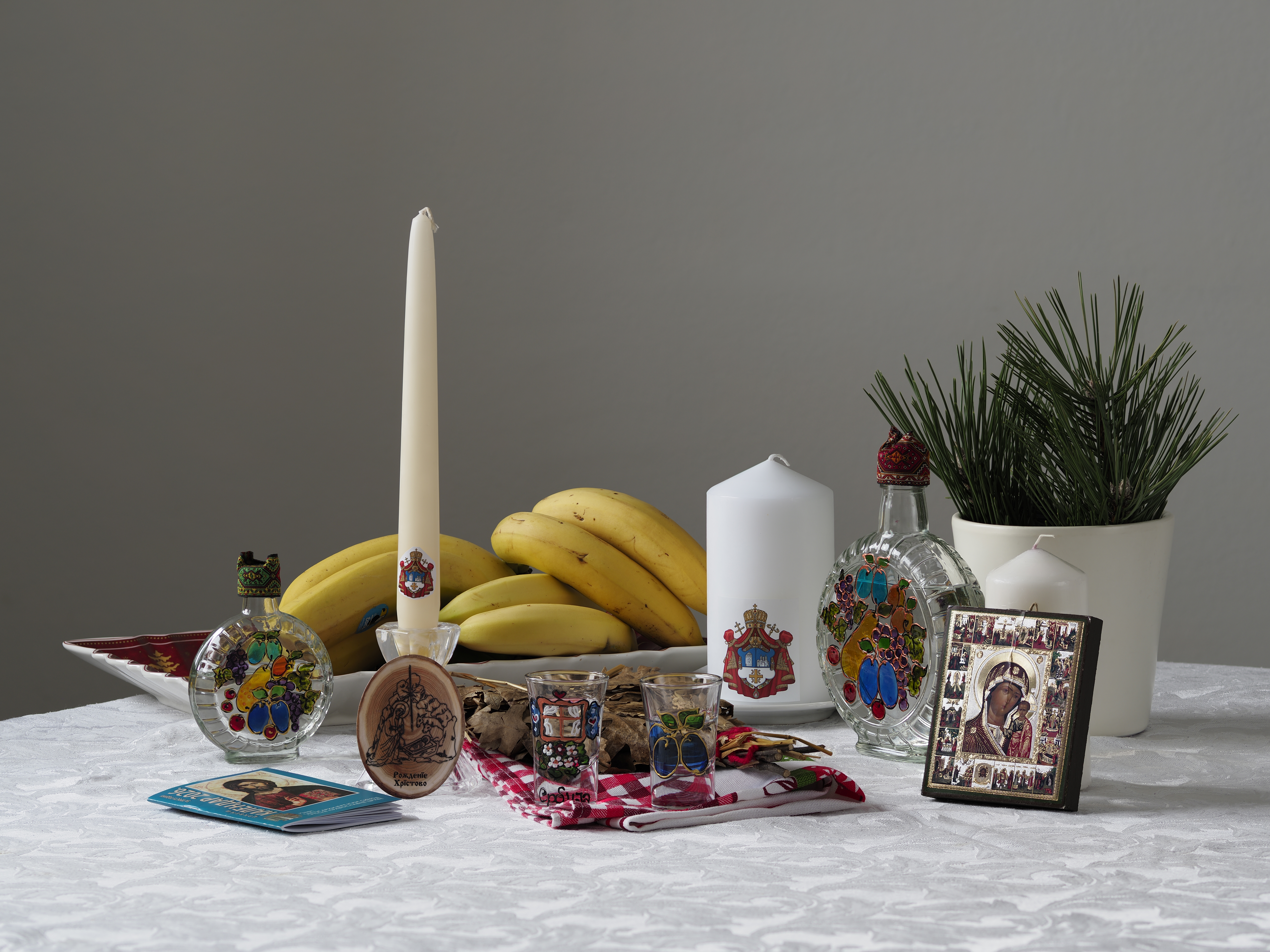
Table for Badnjak celebration before the meal: Badnjak tree branch collected in the Serbian Orthodox Church, surrounded with candles, Icon "Our Lady of Kazan" and Serbian drink rakija (plume)

Scholars regard the badnjak customs as practises inherited from the old Slavic religion. In the pre-Christian religion of the Serbs, as shown by Serbian scholar Veselin Čajkanović, there were trees seen as dwelling places of spirits or divinities. Čajkanović argues that there were also trees seen as divinities per se. He considers the badnjak as a convincing example of the latter. Salutations, prayers, and sacrifices such as grain, wine, and honey are offered to him (the name badnjak is of masculine gender in Serbian); he is consistently treated not as a tree but as a person.

German scholar and folklorist Wilhelm Mannhardt holds that the log represented an incarnation of the spirit of vegetation. The sacrifices offered to the badnjak were meant to guarantee the fertility of fields, the health and happiness of the family. Its burning symbolized sunshine, and was intended to secure the vitalizing power of the sun in the ensuing year. The lighting of the log could be regarded as a fusion of tree worship and fire worship, attested in Slavic customs; e.g., Istrians fed the logs lighted on St. John's Day by sprinkling wheat upon them. Čajkanović characterizes the pre-Christian badnjak as a divinity who dies by burning to be reborn, comparing it in this respect with Attis, Osiris, Adonis, and Sandan. He also proposes that the crosses made from the thicker end of the log may have originated from idols representing deities comparable with the Roman Lares, the cruciform having developed from an anthropomorphic shape of the idols. The badnjak is preferably cut from an oak, which was the most respected tree in the old Slavic religion, associated with the supreme god Perun.

Archaeologist Sir Arthur Evans was a guest in a Serbian highlander family in the region of Krivošije, Montenegrin Littoral. Analyzing the practices, he concluded that the badnjak customs were connected with ancestor worship. The lighting of the log on the ognjište could be seen as a solemn annual rekindling of the sacred hearth fire, regarded as the center of the family life and the seat of the ancestors. The belief that ancestral spirits dwell in the domestic hearth was attested among Slavic and other peoples. Fire worship in the old Slavic religion was mostly transformed into the cult of domestic fire, and thus joined with ancestor worship. A trace of sacrifice to the fire is the coin thrown into it by the polaznik after the ritual of making sparks fly from the badnjak.

Fire from the domestic hearth was under no circumstances given out of the house on Christmas Eve, not even to a neighbor whose fire had gone out. The reason for this prohibition, according to Čajkanović, was the belief that the Eve is a time when the ancestral spirits, guardians of the family's happiness and prosperity, are especially active in this world. Christmas Eve dinner is a feast prepared in their honor, and they join the family at it. They gather on the straw spread over the floor, and on the hearth. These spirits could be removed from the family if any piece of their fire were taken away by an outsider. In people's words, fire should not be given lest the luck be taken away from the house, or for better crops, or because of bees. Referring to the latter explanation, Čajkanović argues that, in the old religion of the Serbs, the bees were regarded as pure and sacred insects, in whom ancestral spirits could dwell. The same explanation, "because of bees", is also given for the aforementioned custom of putting a piece of the badnjak's first splinter in the dough for the česnica.

The Russian philologist Vladimir Toporov has proposed that the felling of the badnjak was originally a reenactment of the mythical fight in which Mladi Božić ("young god") slew his father Stari Badnjak ("old Badnjak"). Božić, the diminutive form of the noun bog, meaning god, is also the Serbian for "Christmas". The characters of Stari Badnjak and Mladi Božić are found in old Serbian Christmas songs, where they are not explicitly referred to as father and son, and no fight between them is mentioned. By Toporov, the former personified the last day of the Old Year, the climax of the power of Chaos, and the latter personified the first day of the New Year, the beginning of reestablishment of Cosmic Order. He regards Stari Badnjak and Mladi Božić as originating from respectively the dragon and the dragon slayer of the Proto-Indo-European mythology. (Note: The old Slavic religion developed from the ancestral Proto-Indo-European religion.) Stari Badnjak would be related to both the Vedic serpent Ahi Budhnya ("the Dragon of the Deep") killed by Indra, and the Greek dragon Python killed by Apollo. (Note: A tree felled by a woodcutter was a Proto-Indo-European simile of the adversary killed by the hero (Watkins 1995).) The words badnjak, budhnya, and python stem from the Proto-Indo-European root *bhudh-, denoting bottom, foundation, depths, and related notions.

According to Russian philologist and mythographer Boris Uspensky, Stari Badnjak and Mladi Božić have analogues in East Slavic tradition—Nikola's Dad and Nikola. The name Nikola is a popular reference to Saint Nicholas of Myra, whose feast falls nineteen days before Christmas, on 6 December, his "dad" being celebrated the day before. Nikola is portrayed in East Slavic folklore as merciful and protective towards the common people, patron of animals and agriculture, connected with riches, abundance, and fertility. Uspensky argues that this saint took on attributes of the serpentine god Volos, whose cult was very strong among East Slavs before Christianization. He was the adversary of the dreadful thunder-god Perun, who is in this case reflected in Nikola's Dad.

The notion of a quarrel between Nikola and his "dad" is present in a number of legends. The connection between the father–son pairs of Stari Badnjak–Mladi Božić and Nikola's Dad–Nikola is corroborated by the fact that, in many East Slavic regions, practices characteristic for Christmas have been transferred to the Feast of Saint Nicholas. There is, however, an inversion in the comparison between these two pairs. In the former pair, the first stems from the mythical dragon, and the second from the dragon fighter, while in the latter pair it is vice versa. This inversion explains, by Uspensky, the fact that in some areas Nikola's Dad is celebrated on the day after his son's feast, rather than on the eve of it. In that way, the "dragon" (Nikola) comes before the "dragon fighter" (Nikola's Dad), as is the case with Stari Badnjak and Mladi Božić.

Serbian ethnologist Petar Vlahović has proposed that the noun badnjak and the related adjective badnji (attributive "Christmas Eve") are derived from the root of the verb bdeti ("to be awake"), referring to a custom of staying awake through the night before Christmas Day. The same etymology of the adjective badnji has also been proposed by Vuk Stefanović Karadžić, 19th-century Serbian philologist, systematizer of oral literature, and ethnographer.

== Similar European traditions ==
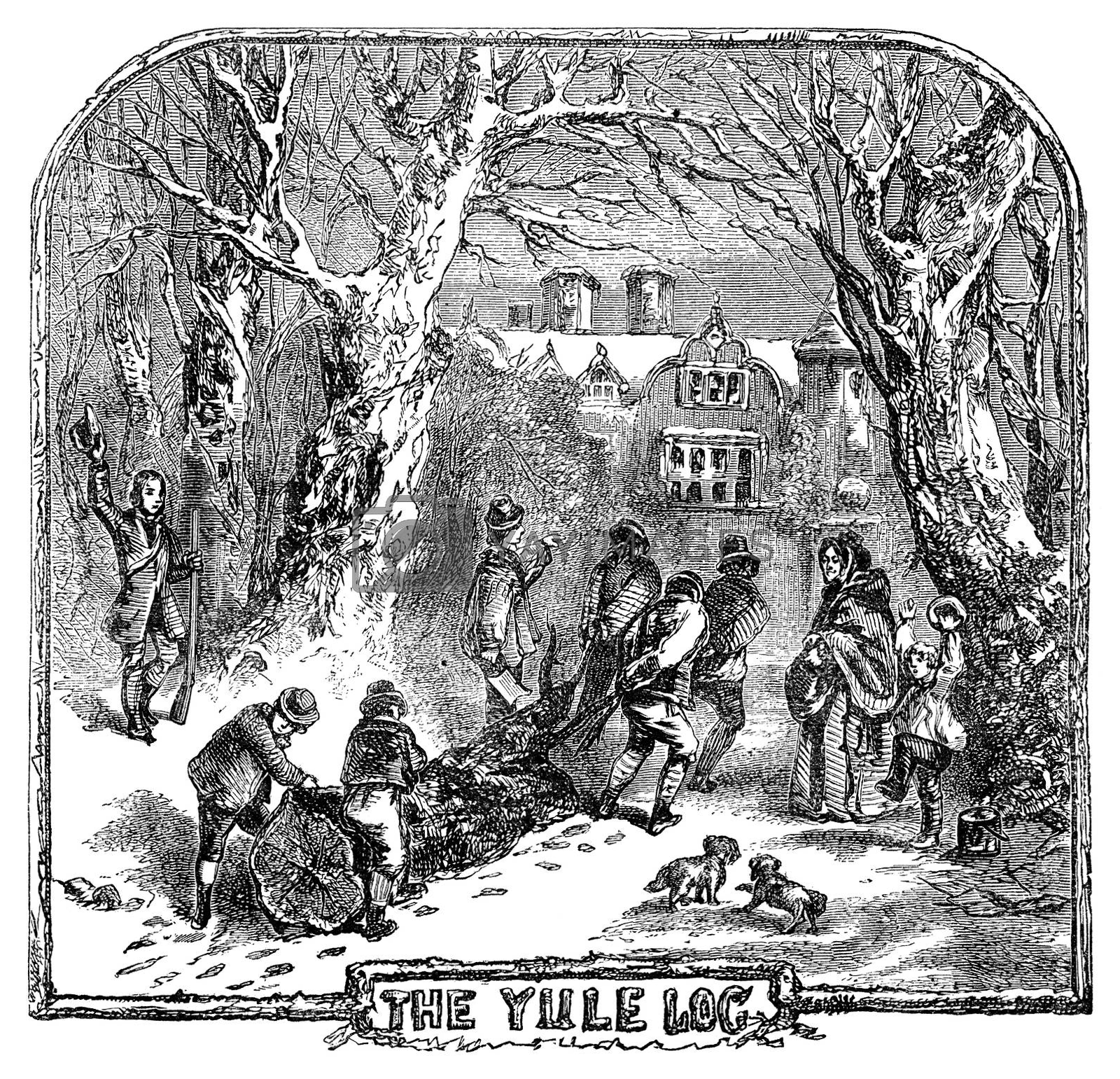
An illustration of people collecting a Yule log from the Chambers Book of Days

The custom that a family solemnly brings a log into the house and lights it on the hearth on Christmas Eve has been recorded in various parts of Europe. In England, a Yule log used to be festively kindled on the domestic hearth so "that sweet luck may come while the log is a-teending", as described by 17th-century poet Robert Herrick. In France, the log had different regional names: chalendal, calignaou, tréfoir, and tréfouet. In Provence, it had to be cut from a fruit tree; it was brought in by the whole family while they sang a carol praying for blessing on the house, that the women might bear children, the nanny-goats kids, and the ewes lambs, and that their grain and wine might abound. Before the log was placed on the fire, the youngest child in the family poured wine on it. Logs were devotionally laid on the domestic fire on Christmas Eve in various parts of Italy; in Tuscany, Christmas is called Festa di Ceppo, literally "feast of log". In the Val di Chiana, the children of the family were blindfolded and commanded to beat the burning log with tongs. Traces of Christmas-log customs can also be found in Germany and Scandinavia. In Thuringia the family placed a Christklotz (Christ log) on the fire before going to bed, so that it might burn all through the night.

In Croatian tradition, objects of two different types are referred to as badnjak. The first type includes leaved branches cut from Turkey oaks or hazel trees, up to 2 meters (6.6 ft) long with as many catkins as possible. Such a branch used to be placed on Christmas Eve morning above the house door, under the eaves, or on the roof, and had an aesthetic role. The other type includes logs cut usually from oak trunks. In the evening the family used to ritually bring three such logs into the house and burn them on the hearth. These practices are no longer performed, but in some places a modified form of badnjak is used: a cross is carved into the bark of pieces of firewood which are burned in kitchen stoves on Christmas Eve. In Bulgaria, the youngest man of the family goes on the Eve into a forest to cut down an oak, elm, or pear tree, which will be used as the badnik (бъдник). After the man brings it into the house, a hole is bored in one end of the badnik and filled with wine, cooking oil, and incense. The hole is plugged, and that end of the log is wrapped with a white linen cloth before the badnik is festively burned on the hearth.

In Greece, a large log was lit on the hearth on Christmas Eve and kept burning or smoldering through the Twelve Days of Christmas. This was done as a protection against the demons called Kallikantzaroi, believed to be emerging from their dens at night during that period to attack people and damage their property. The fire and smoke from the log was thought to prevent the Kallikantzaroi from entering the house down the chimney. The ritual burning of logs on the Eve was also carried out in Albania. When the buzm, as the log was called there, was about to be brought into the house, a member of the family would go out into the yard, shout the name of the household's head, and proclaim that the buzm was coming and bringing all kinds of delicious things. The head of the household would respond by saying "You are welcome!" and the buzm would be ceremonially brought in, greeted by the family and treated with great respect. The log would be placed on the hearth, and often a significant part of all food and drink in the house would be put on the log and burned together with it.

== See also ==
- Zapis, sacred tree in Serbia
- Nyja, Polish god of underworld
