= Česnica =

Serbian ceremonial, round loaf of bread

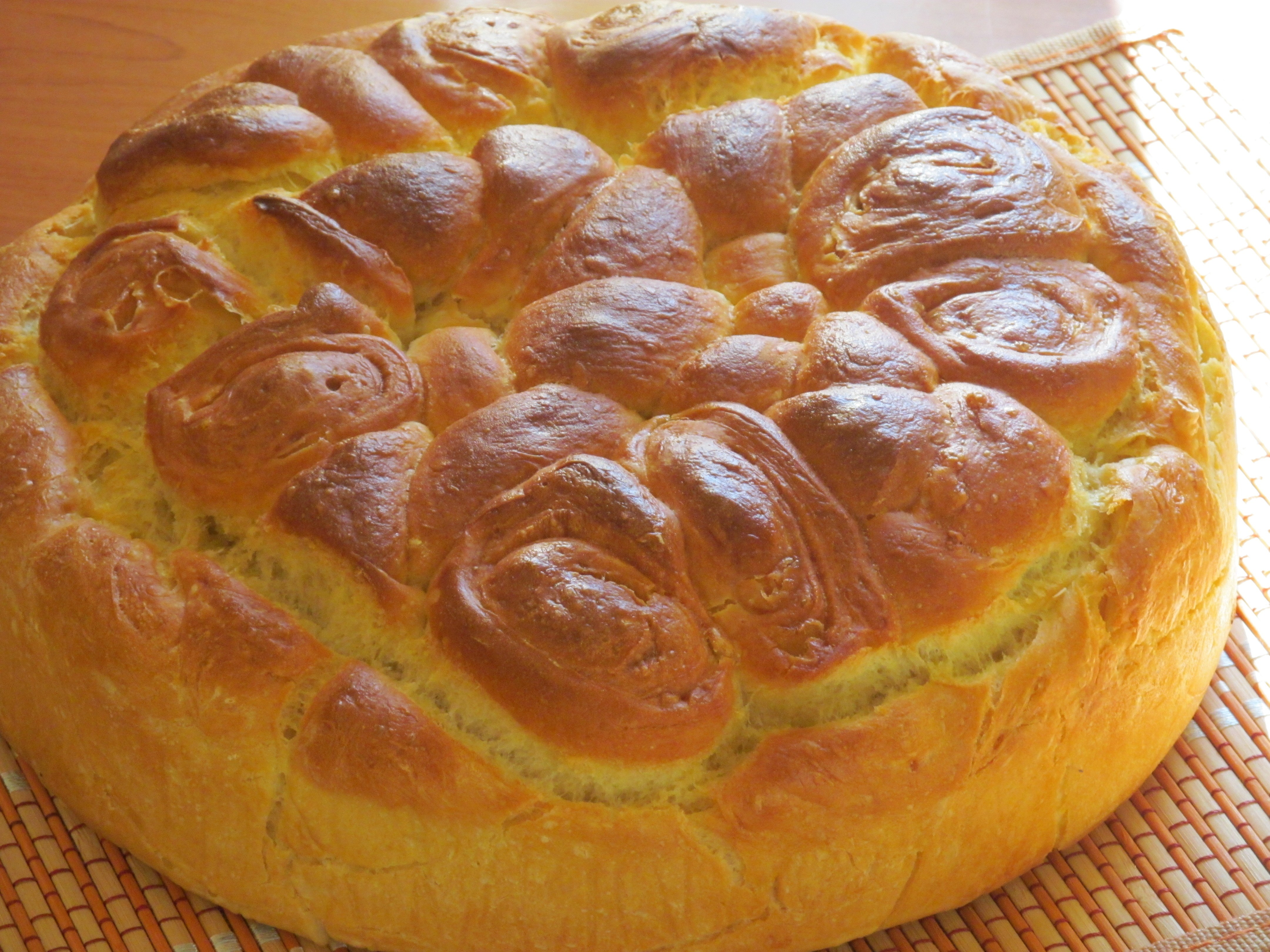
- Home-made Česnica
- Type: Bread
- Place of origin: Serbia
- Associated cuisine: Serbian
- Main ingredients: Wheat flour, water

A česnica (Serbian Cyrillic: чесница, Serbian pronunciation: [tʃěːsnit͜sa]; derived from the noun čest, meaning "share"), also called Božićna pogača (Serbian Cyrillic: Божићна погача, "Christmas pogača") is the ceremonial, round loaf of bread that is an indispensable part of Christmas dinner in Serbian tradition.^{1} The preparation of this bread may be accompanied by various rules and rituals. A coin or other small objects are often put into the dough. At the beginning of Christmas dinner, the česnica is rotated three times counterclockwise, before being broken among the family members. The person who finds the coin in his piece of the bread will supposedly be exceptionally lucky in the coming year. The česnica was used in folk belief for divining or influencing the amount of crops.

== Preparation ==
The česnica is usually made with wheat flour and baked on Christmas Eve or early Christmas morning by the head of household or the woman of the house. The water for the dough is in some areas collected on Christmas Day before sunrise from a spring or a well, into which a handful of grain is thrown. It is called the strong water and is believed to be imbued with beneficial power. The preparation of the bread may be accompanied by various rules: the flour is taken only from a full sack; the water for the dough is collected from three springs; the person who will prepare the česnica must bathe before that; etc. In eastern and southern Serbia, after they kneaded the dough for the česnica, the head of household or the woman of the house take hold with dough-stained hands of the fruit trees, beehives, and cattle to make them more productive.

A coin is often put into the dough during the kneading, some families using the same coin from year to year; it may be a valuable piece. In some regions, little figures carved from cornel wood, representing chickens, oxen, cows, swine, bees, and the like, are also put into the dough. In other areas, the inserted objects include grains, broad beans, walnuts, tufts of wool, twigs, and splinters from various wooden buildings. In Semberija, families insert a piece of the first splinter produced in felling the badnjak; this is done "because of bees", as the reason is traditionally termed. Before baking, the upper surface of the loaf may be inscribed with various symbols, such as a Christogram, or stars, circles, and impressions of keys or combs.

In Vojvodina česnica is not a kind of bread, but a pastry made of layers of filo filled with roughly chopped nuts and raisins, similar to baklava, but drier and is usually made exclusively with added honey. A coin is placed at some point between the layers.

== Christmas dinner ==
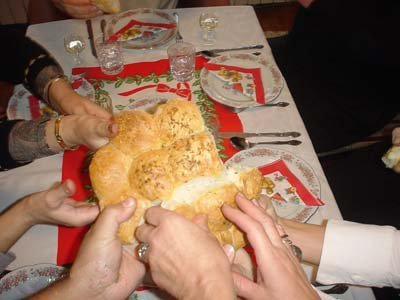
Members of a family break the česnica at a dinner during Christmas

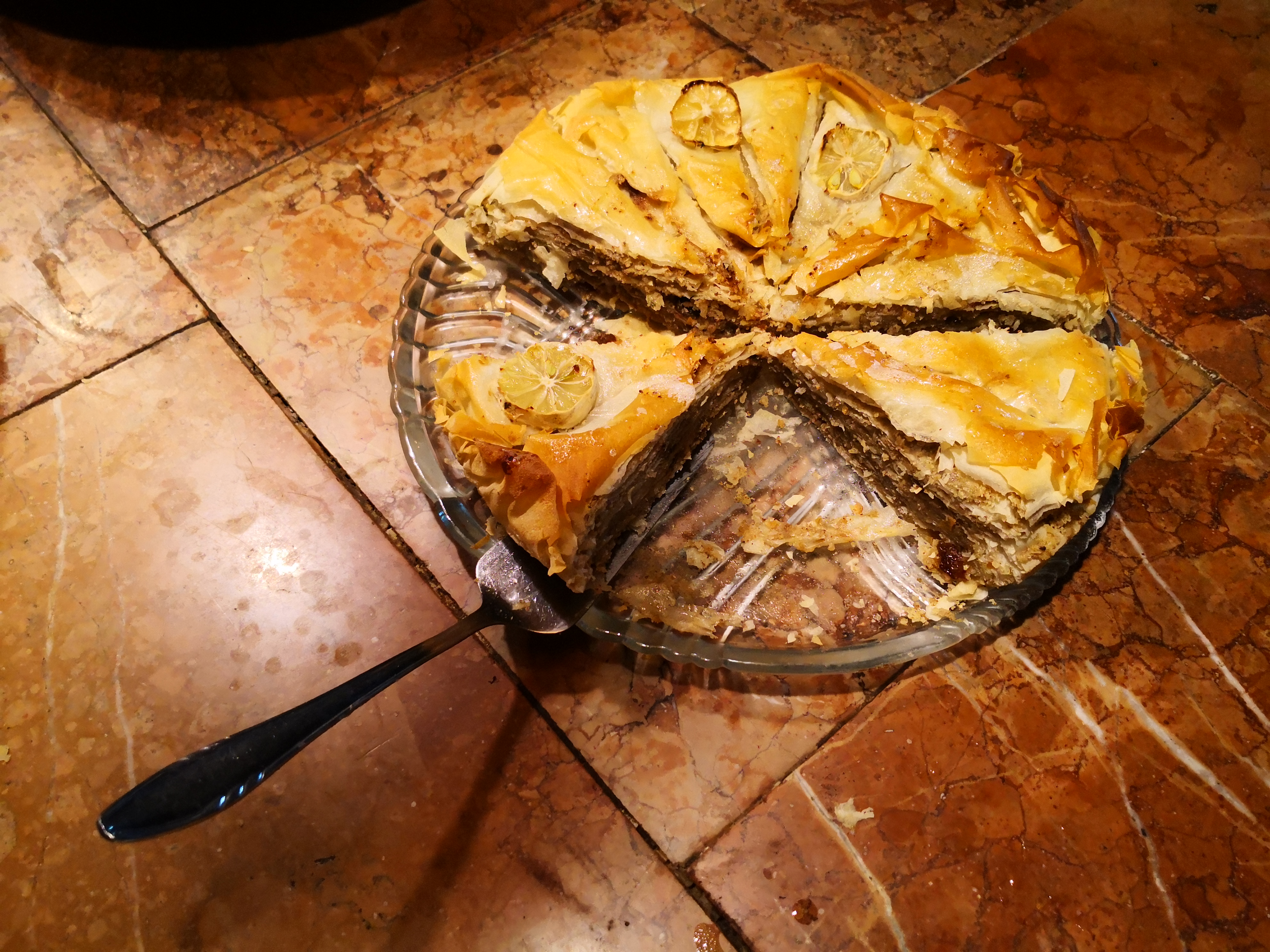
Česnica in form of a walnut pie is more common in northern Serbia, Vojvodina since Holy Roman Empress Maria Theresa's tax on cutting the bread česnica for annual slava and Christmas ceremonies

Christmas dinner is the most festive meal of the year. It begins about noon, or even earlier. The family members seated at the table stand up when the head of household gives a sign. The head makes the Sign of the Cross and lights a candle, before censing the gathered relatives and saying a prayer, after which they all kiss each other while saying, "Peace of God, Christ Is Born." The head and another man of the family hold the česnica between themselves, rotating it three times counterclockwise. The česnica is then carefully broken among the relatives, so that each of them gets his own piece of the bread, without a crumb falling off. This is similar to the rituals surrounding vasilopita.

Up to three pieces of the loaf may be set aside: one for the absent relatives (if there are such), one for a stranger who might join the family at the dinner, and one for the polaznik, their first visitor on Christmas Day (if he is not present). The rest of the česnica is consumed during the dinner. The family member who finds the coin in his piece of the bread will supposedly be exceptionally lucky in the coming year. The head may try to buy the coin from this lucky relative. Each of the other objects hidden in the bread indicates the segment of the household economy in which the person who finds it in his share of the česnica will be especially successful.

In some regions, such as the Bay of Kotor and Bukovica, the česnica is not broken and eaten at Christmas dinner. It is instead placed on the table or nearby, with a candle stuck into it. The head of household lights this candle at the beginning of Christmas dinner. In Bukovica, several olive or bay laurel twigs are stuck around the candle. In the Bay of Kotor, the date when the česnica is eaten varies from place to place; it may be even twenty days after Christmas, on the Feast of Saint Sava. In some areas only half of the česnica is consumed at Christmas dinner, the other half being eaten a week later, on the Feast of St. Basil the Great.

== Folk belief ==
In traditional folk belief, the česnica may be used for divination in some regions. In Bosnia, when the dough is shaped and ready for baking, a number of notches are cut in the upper surface of it, and seeds of various crops are placed into the notches. The more a notch has risen when the česnica is baked, the more productive the crop whose seed is in it will be in the following year. In Jadar, western Serbia, the number of embers of the badnjak equal to the sum of grain and livestock sorts grown by the family are taken out of the fire and placed on the česnica. Each of the sorts is associated with its own ember on that loaf. The sort whose ember retains its glow longer than the others should be the most productive in the coming year. To ensure an abundance of grain, some people place a bowl filled with grain on the česnica.

In 19th-century Herzegovina, two men would rotate the česnica between themselves, one of them asking, "Am I protruding [from behind the česnica]?" and the other responding, "You are, a little." The first man would then say, "Now a little, and next year not even a little." The purpose of this conversation was to invoke an abundance of grain in the coming year. A similar practice was recorded in the 12th century among West Slavs on the island of Rugia in the Baltic Sea. Those Slavs were adherents of the cult of Svantovit, and had a big temple dedicated to that god at Cape Arkona. Saxo Grammaticus described, in the Book XIV of his Gesta Danorum, the festival of Svantovit which was held annually after harvest in front of that temple. In one of the rituals, a round loaf of bread covered with honey, with the diameter equal to a man's height, was held vertically in front of the statue of Svantovit. The priest of the temple went behind the loaf, before asking the gathered people whether they saw him. After they responded that they did, the priest expressed the wish that next year they would not see him. The aim of the ritual was to ensure a rich harvest of grain in the following year.

== See also ==
- Barmbrack – similar tradition from Ireland

== Notes ==
^1 Christmas does not fall on the same day for the Serbs as for the Western Christians, although they celebrate it on the same date—25 December. This is because the Serbian Orthodox Church uses the Julian calendar rather than the Gregorian used in the West. Since 1900, the Julian calendar is 13 days behind the Gregorian calendar, and this difference will remain until 2100. During this period, 25 December in the Julian calendar—Christmas for the Serbs—corresponds to 7 January of the following year in the Gregorian calendar.
