= Badnjak (Croatian) =

Tradition in Croatian Christmas

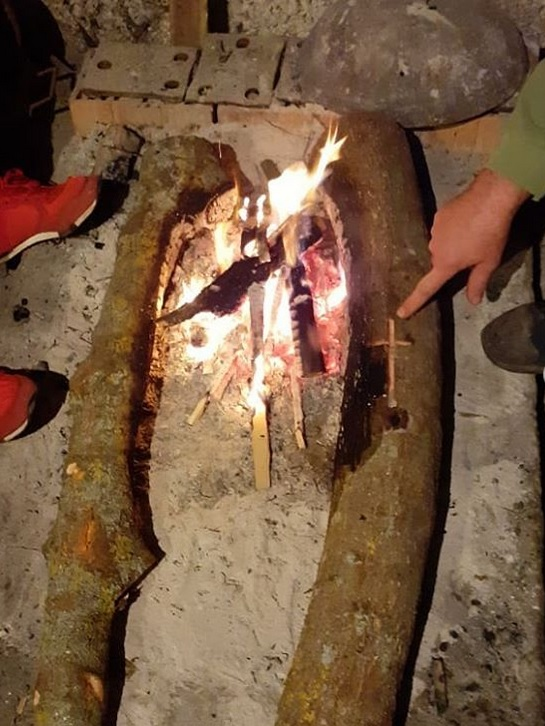
Two badnjak logs, one with a carved-in cross, being lit in Trogir on Christmas Eve

Badnjak (Croatian pronunciation: [badɲaːk]), refers to a log brought into the house and placed on the fire on the evening of Christmas Eve, a central tradition in Croatian Christmas celebration, much like a yule log in other European traditions. In Croatian, the name for Christmas Eve is derived from the term badnjak. The log is cut with great ceremony on Christmas Eve morning, which for Roman Catholic Croats is December 24. The cutting, preparation, bringing in, and laying on the fire are surrounded by elaborate religious rituals, with many regional variations. The log is kept burning throughout Christmas Day.

With increased urbanization and migrations to cities, the badnjak tradition has recently been limited to more rural areas, as many urban homes do not have a hearth or fireplace, increasing the risk of a fire hazard, along with the fact that it is near impossible to cut one's own log in the city. Instead, some may choose to have a symbolic log kept in the home.

== Etymology ==
The term badnjak comes from the old Slavic words bodar or badar, which means "to be awake" (bdjeti). This refers to staying awake throughout the night to tend to the badnjak and wait for the coming of the saviour Jesus Christ on Christmas Day. The term badnjak lends itself to the literal meaning of Christmas Eve, with Badnji Dan meaning Christmas Eve Day, and Badnja Večer meaning Christmas Eve night.

== Origins ==
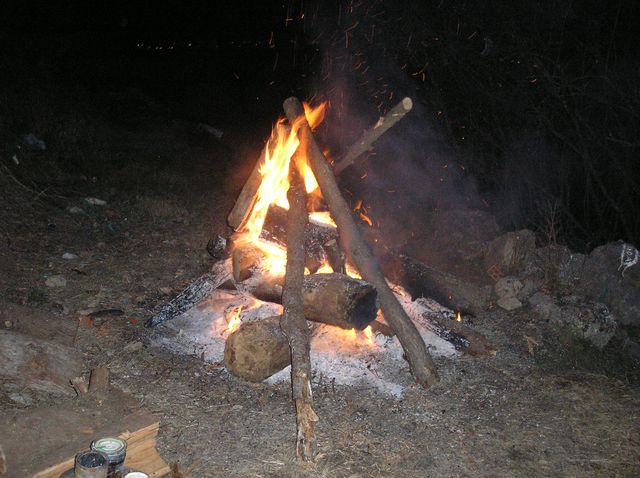
A lit badnjak (log)

There are many interpretations for the meaning of the badnjak, but scholars agree that it is a remnant of pagan Indo-European times that has adapted to Christianity. Today, the festive kindling of the log commemorates the fire that—according to folk tradition—the shepherds of Bethlehem built in the cave where Jesus Christ was born, to warm the baby Jesus and his mother Mary throughout the night. The badnjak may also be seen as a symbol of the cross upon which Christ was crucified, the warmth of its fire symbolizing the salvation which, in the Christian belief, the crucifixion made possible for mankind. As the log burned and turned into ashes, it symbolized Christ's resurrection and his triumph over sin. Scholars regard the tradition as inherited from the old Slavic religion, where Christians began referring to the celebration of Christmas as the Feast of Lights. They interpret the badnjak as an incarnation of the spirit of vegetation, and as a divinity who dies by burning to be reborn, to whom sacrifices and prayers were offered for the fertility of fields, the health and happiness of the family, in which the rekindling of the hearth-fire symbolizes its importance and center of family life throughout many generations. In some parts, some people focus more on the cult of their dead, where they equate the burning fire to their departed family members.

== Preparation ==
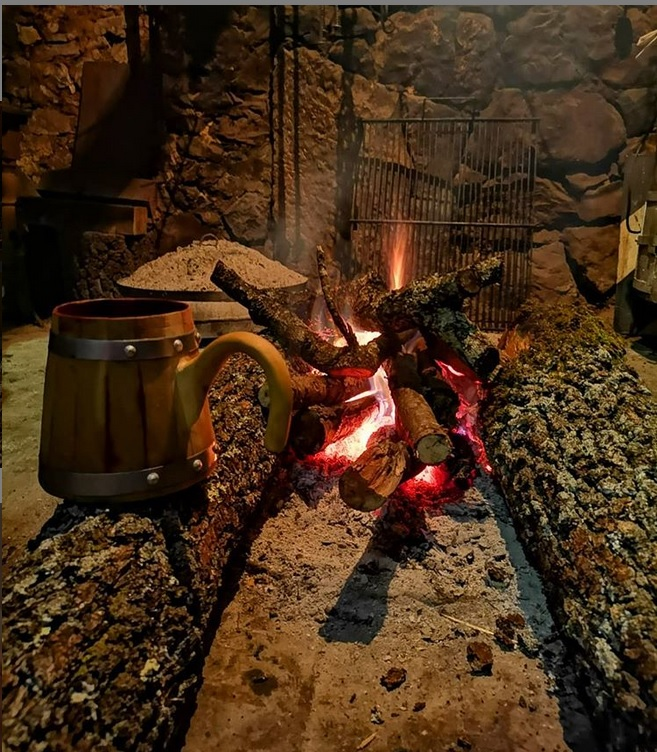
Lighting the badnjak logs in Drniš, with the traditional bukar filled with wine

Among Croats of the Roman Catholic faith, Christmas Eve begins on December 24. Early in the morning, traditionally before dawn, the father or another male of the household goes into the forest to chop a piece of log, usually from an oak tree if it could be found, but, if the region does not have any, than beech, olive, or maple can be used. When the perfect tree is found, the father would invoke God by reciting the Lord's Prayer several times and making the Sign of the Cross and would then cut it. When the father arrives back home with the badnjak, he announces "May Jesus and Mary be praised! I wish you a good Christmas Eve" (Faljen Isus i Marija! Dobro Vam došla Badnja Večer), and the family replies "Today and always." The greeting can differ slightly among different regions; in Slavonia for example, the father would say, May Jesus be praised! I wish you a good Christmas Eve and Adam and Eve [feast day] (Faljen Isus! Čestita vam badnja večer i Adam i Eva). In the Croatian Catholic calendar, December 24 is the feast day of Adam and Eve. The log is placed on the porch and is not brought into the house until the evening.

When evening comes, the badnjak log is placed in the hearth. In Dalmatia, as the badnjak is brought into the home, it is sprinkled with wine and grain. In the southern part, women would adorn the logs with leaves and flowers and wrap them around with red and gold ribbons. In Dubrovnik, the father sprinkles corn and wine on the badnjak while reciting prayers. In other regions, the badnjak is sprinkled with wheat and holy water, while in Hercegovina the badnjak is completely bathed in holy water. As the log is lit, the father of the family recites the Apostles' Creed. In southern Dalmatia, two logs are often placed in the shape of a cross. After the log is lit, he says "Jesus be praised. Welcome Christmas Eve." Sometimes, more holy water is sprinkled on the badnjak after it is lit. Depending on the region, people may choose to sprinkle bits of wheat grain, or even add some of the evening meal to the badnjak. In Istria, if wine or rakija is sprinkled on the badnjak, a family member toasts: "Drink to your health" (Pij u tvoje zdravlje) believing if they don't then ill fortune will come to them. The log is usually allowed to burn all night into Christmas Day, and family members often take turns all night ensuring the log does not go out.

The Badnjak must last all evening and in many regions, it is burned again. In certain regions, it is re-lit in the New Year on the Feast of The Three Kings and sometimes it stays by the hearth until Lent, where it serves as a special log upon which other logs are placed. In the villages, the ashes or charred fragments of the badnjak are scattered in the fields to assure a fruitful crop.

== Celebration ==
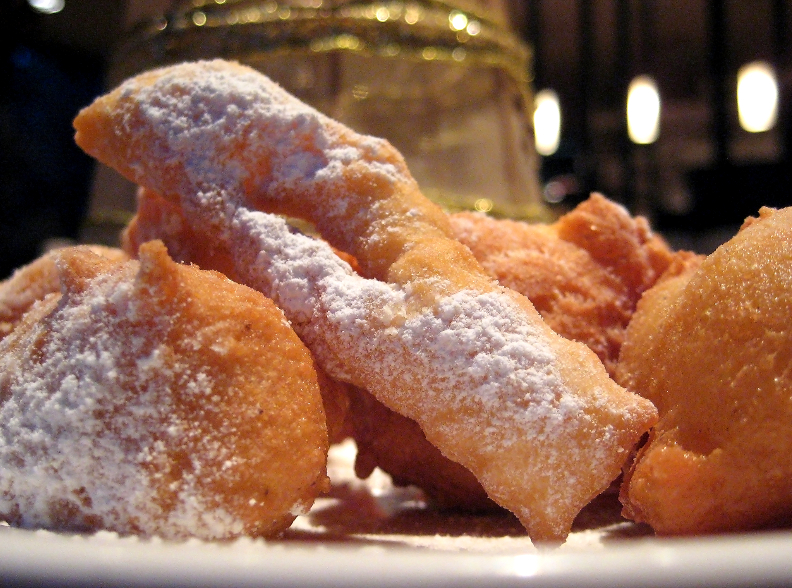
Kroštule and fritule are in some parts of Croatia popular food on Badnjak.

Much like other European countries, Croatia has specific traditional celebrations that go along with the felling and lighting of the badnjak. The day is spent in preparation for Christmas, with the home being decorated and the feast for the next day being prepared, and all chores must be done before the ringing of the church bells and the lighting of the badnjak. The Christmas tree, which first arrived in Croatia in the mid-19th century, is still relatively new and is usually decorated on Christmas Eve. Other more traditional Croatian decorations include children hanging greenery throughout the home, such as holly branches, sage, ivy and evergreen wreaths, which are seen as a symbol of the strength of life in the middle of winter. Nativity scenes are usually present in every Christian home, and are generally kept under the tree or in another prominent location.

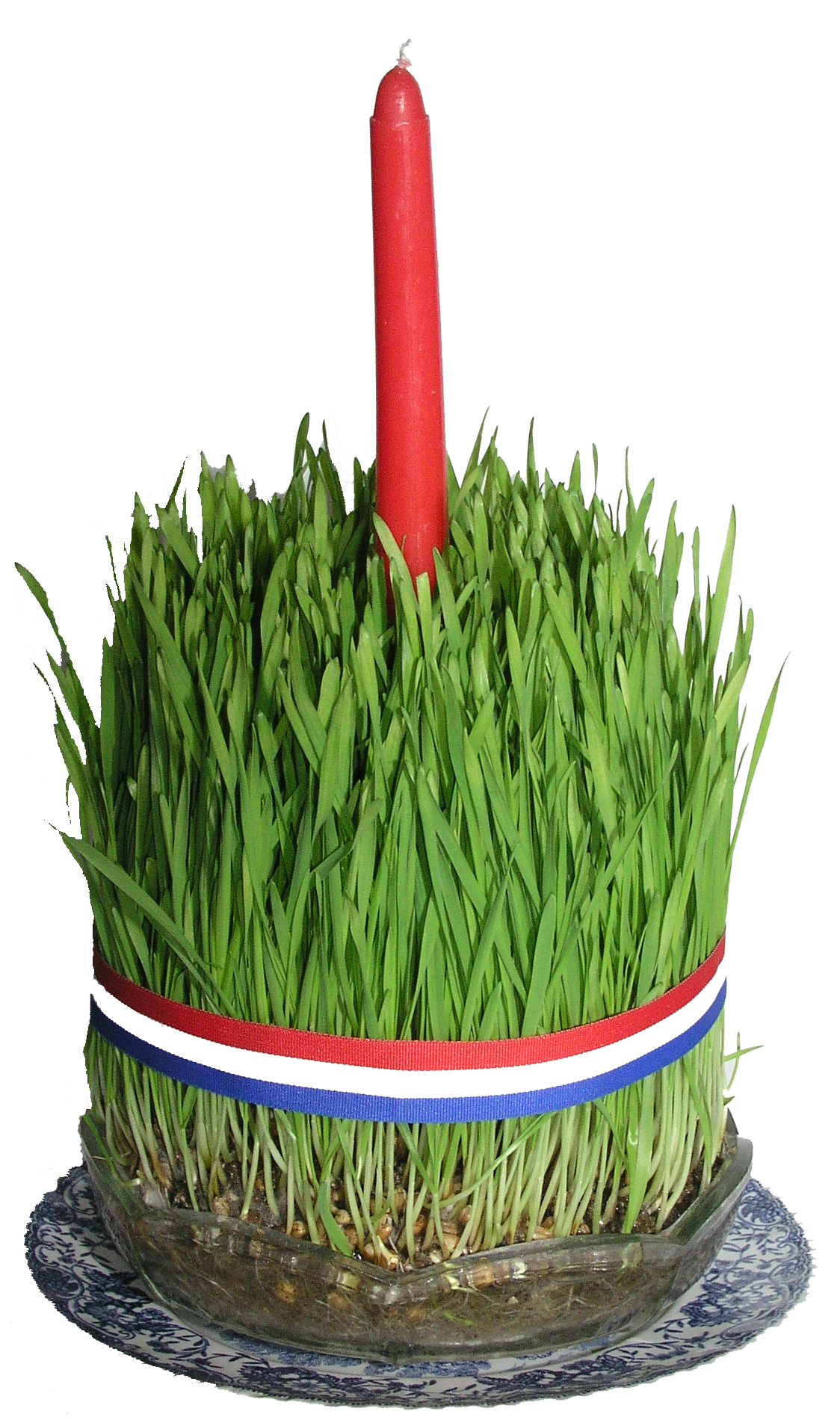
The pšenica (wheat grass) are used for the Christmas candles.

Another old tradition is sowing wheat seeds in a bowl of water (usually on St. Lucy's day), which will grow until Christmas and is then used to decorate the table on Christmas. The wheat is trimmed and usually wrapped with a red, white, and blue ribbon of the Croatian tricolour. Most Croats put candles or other objects such as apples in the middle of the wheat, with candles symbolizing the birth of Christ. A bundle of straw is brought into the house by the head of the family, who greets the home with a Christmas wish, and the straw is then spread under the table and throughout the house, symbolizing the birth of Christ in the manger. Families usually sit on the straw after dinner when gathered around the badnjak.

Throughout the day, the woman of the house prepares the Christmas meal, which usually consists of many courses and desserts. Traditional foods include lamb, roasted pig, sarma with sauerkraut and sausage, stuffed peppers, pita, salad, and freshly baked bread. Some traditional Christmas desserts include fritule, kroštule, strudel, orahnjača, makovnjača, Bishop's bread, and gugelhupf.

Since Christmas Eve is a fasting day, the family only has a small meal at dinnertime. For Badnjak supper, baklar (cod fish) from Dalmatia is eaten along with a salad or cabbage. A large supply of dried fruits, honey, and nuts (mainly walnuts and almonds) are always kept at home and eaten throughout the Christmas season.

== See also ==
- Badnjak (Serbian)
- Yule log
- Roman Catholicism in Croatia
