= Veselin Čajkanović =

Serbian classical scholar (1881–1946)

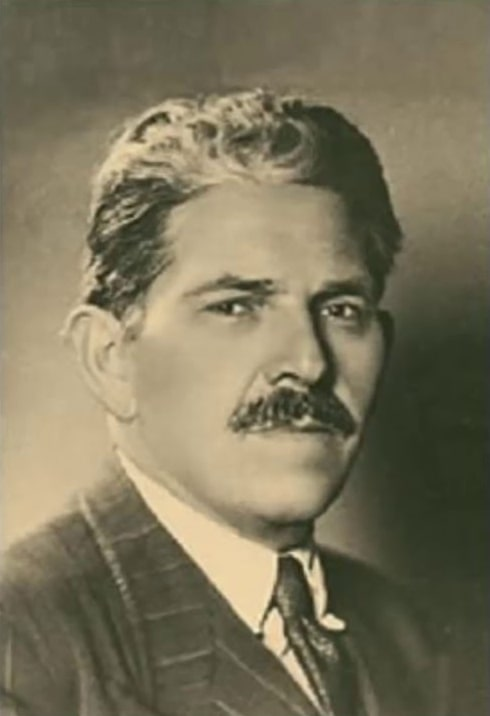
- Born: Веселин Чајкановић; April 9, 1881; Belgrade, Principality of Serbia
- Died: August 6, 1946 (aged 65); Belgrade, FPR Yugoslavia
- Occupations: classical scholar, philosopher, ethnologist, religious history scholar

Veselin Čajkanović (Serbian Cyrillic: Веселин Чајкановић; 1881 – 1946) was a Serbian classical scholar, philologist, philosopher, ethnologist, orientalist, religious history scholar, and Greek and Latin translator.

== Biography ==
Born in Belgrade, Čajkanović studied classical philology at Belgrade's Velika škola, and received an international scholarship, on the recommendation of professor Pavle Popović, to take post-graduate studies at Leipzig University and the Ludwig-Maximilians-Universität München (where he took his Master of Arts degree) and finished his doctorate under Karl Krumbacher. In 1908, he became a Latin lecturer at the Belgrade University School of Philosophy and published his MA dissertation, Quaestionum paroemiographicarum capita selecta, in Tübingen.

He met Ruža Živković, student of Roman languages, at the faculty in Belgrade, and they got married in 1921. They had two children, Marija, and Nikola.

Čajkanović fought in both Balkan Wars and in World War I. He retreated with the Serbian Army through Albania in face of 1915 anti-Serbian offensive of the Central Powers. He contracted diphtheria during the retreat through Albania and was transferred to a hospital in Bizerte. Later he was at the Thessaloniki Front, where he described his activities in his Autobiography as "defending, together with other Balkan Christians, his country from foreign conquerors." Čajkanović was awarded the Order of the White Eagle with Swords and the Légion d'honneur. Shortly before the end of the war, Čajkanović was sent to Paris and London on a mission "to show what Serbia is and who the Serbs are." There he participated in preparing lectures organized by the Serbian Legation and during his free time read and studied at the Bibliothèque Nationale in Paris and the British Museum Library in London.

In 1919, he returned to Belgrade to resume his work as a professor (docent), assistant professor and in 1922 he was named full professor. From 1921 on he taught the comparative history of religion at the Faculty of Theology in Belgrade. In 1923, he was a professor of classical languages, chairman of the classics department at Belgrade University, and prolific contributor to 'Srpski književni glasnik' (The Serbian Literary Herald).

According to Marko Živković in the Anthropology of East Europe Review, "Čajkanović was one who brought the latest philosophical, historical, ethnographic and comparative methodologies of interwar Europe to bear on his life project of reconstructing from the pre-Christian, pagan Serbian mythology and religions. Čajkanović did most of his work between the wars in Belgrade where he was a professor at the university and a member of the Serbian Academy of Sciences and Arts. He did not leave a line of successors, as he might have done, being in many respects a figure comparable to what Mircea Eliade was in Romania."

Čajkanović's collected works, edited by Vojislav Đurić, were published in five volumes in 1994 in Belgrade.

== Post-WWII persecution ==
The communists who took over after the war did not approve of Čajkanović's scholarship, and even to this day, most of his work is still in manuscript form. Veselin Čajkanović taught at the Faculty of Theology of the University of Belgrade throughout German occupation of Yugoslavia, and when the provisional government of the so-called Democratic Federal Yugoslavia put Communists in power, he was so engrossed with his work that he did not notice what went around him. He may not have been himself troubled about gunfire in the streets, but he began to fear for the safety of his family in such uncertain conditions.

Above all a professor who was relatively uninterested in politics and causes, Čajkanović certainly realized, as did his compatriots and fellow-professors, Vladimir Velmar-Janković, Slobodan Jovanović, Dimitrije Najdanović, Miloš Mladenović, Djoko Slijepčević and many others, who left the country in time, that an environment of occupation, revolution and civil war was – as Čajkanović put it – "hardly the time for teaching." Yet he taught privately just the same since the University of Belgrade was forced to close down in 1941. And so, it was not long before he was dismissed by the Communists as "an undesirable war criminal" for teaching while under Nazi occupation. It came as an unbearable shock to a sensitive scholar like himself. He fell ill never to recover his health again. He died a year later, in 1946.

== Selected works ==
He authored several books, while numerous studies and articles remained scattered in various publications. His texts were published mainly in Serbian, Latin, and German and include:

- The folklore and religion studies (1924)
- Vergil and his contemporaries (1930)
- A survey of Roman literature (1932)
- Florilegium latinum in usum schoiarfum (1940)
- On Serbian Highest Deity (1941)

Academic offices
Preceded by Milorad Popović	Dean of the Faculty of Philosophy; 1930–1933	Succeeded by Vladimir Ćorović
