= Easter in Cyprus =

Greek Cypriot observance

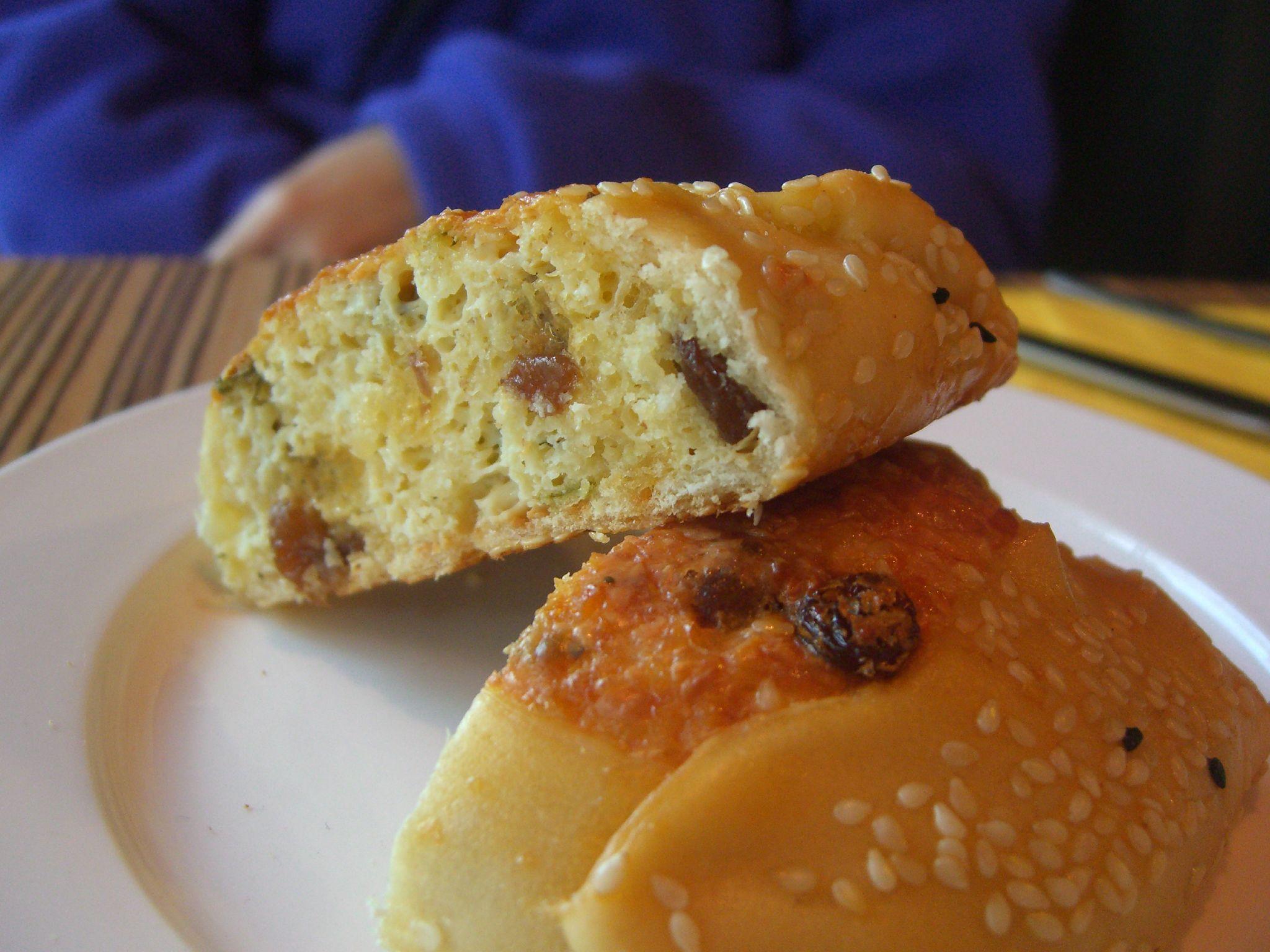
- Flaounes
- Observed by: Greek Cypriots
- Liturgical color: White
- Type: Religious, Cultural
- Significance: Greek Orthodox Easter
- Celebrations: Church services, baking tsourekia, dancing, singing
- Observances: Easter eggs, caroling
- Begins: Lazarus Saturday
- Ends: Easter Saturday
- Duration: 2 Weeks
- Frequency: Annual
- Related to: Easter, Resurrection of Jesus

Easter in Cyprus, locally known as Pascha (Greek: Πάσχα), or in the local dialect Paschan (Greek: Πάσκαν) is the local observances of the Orthodox Christians in Cyprus. It is a blend of Greek traditions and unique Cypriot ones. Public holidays in Cyprus are Holy Friday, Easter Sunday and Bright Monday. Banks, schools and some stores are also closed on Holy Saturday and Bright Tuesday.

== Palm Sunday ==
The day before Palm Sunday, which is known as Lazarus Saturday, the tradition of lazarines takes place - girls and boys dress up in traditional costumes and sing carols.

== Holy Thursday ==
Great and Holy Thursday in Cyprus commomerates the betrayal of Judas Iscariot, the prayer of Jesus in Gesthemane and the Holy Passion of Christ.

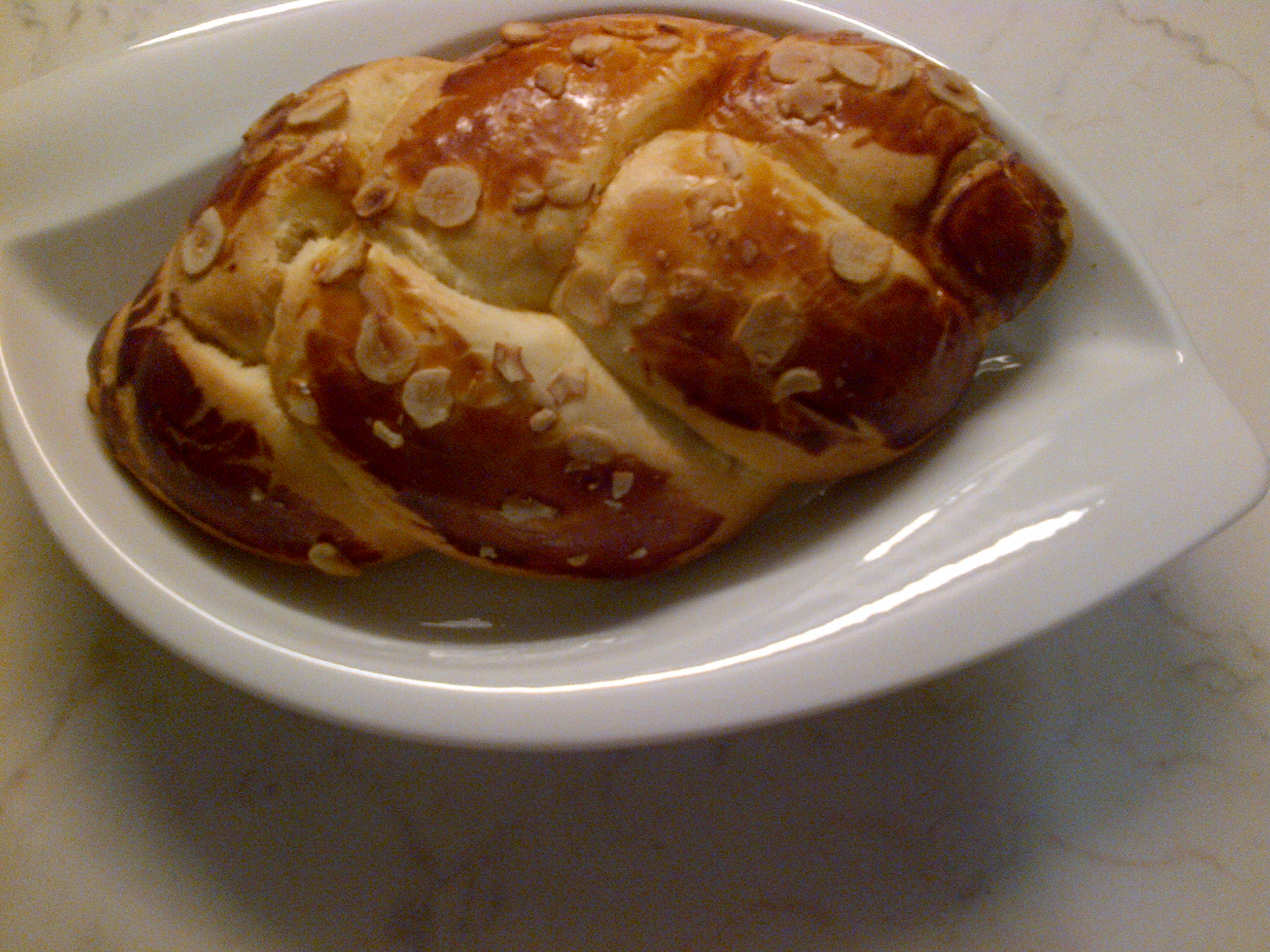
On that day, Cypriots dye red eggs, and the preparation of flaounes and tsourekia begins. Households also engage in cleaning the house. The Cypriot Maronite Catholic and Latin Catholic community, the Washing of the Saints' feet is performed during Catholic mass.

== Holy Friday ==
Great and Holy Friday in Cyprus is observed in commemoration of the Deposition of Jesus and His Burial. It is also a public holiday.

=== Traditions ===
Holy Friday is a strict fasting day. The traditional meal of the day is fakes with vinegar, symbolizing the suffering of Jesus on the cross. This meal may also be eaten on Holy Thursday. It is also the day when the final preparations for Easter cooking, like baking koulourakia (Easter biscuits) for them to be eaten on Holy Saturday.

=== Epitaphios in Nicosia ===
At 9 p.m, the procession of the Epitaphios within Nicosia's walled old city takes place. The philarmonic of the Cyprus police accompany the procession, which starts in three different churches (Faneromeni Church, Trypiotis Church and Church of St Savvas) and they meet at Eleftheria square.

== Holy Saturday ==
On Great and Holy Saturday the descent of Jesus Christ to Hades and the discovery of the empty tomb, preparing the faithful for His Resurrection.

=== Earthquake reenactment ===
On Holy Saturday at 7.30 am, the traditional “earthquake” custom is reenacted. During the service, loud noise is created and all the icons in the church are shaken. The faithful strike the pews, representing the earthquake during Christ's Resurrection. This is called the First Resurrection (Πρώτη Ανάσταση). This custom is alsofound all across Greece - but in Greece the earthquake reenactment takes place later during the day.

=== Holy Light tradition ===
The reception of the Holy Light takes place in Jerusalem and is transferred to Cyprus by a special flight.

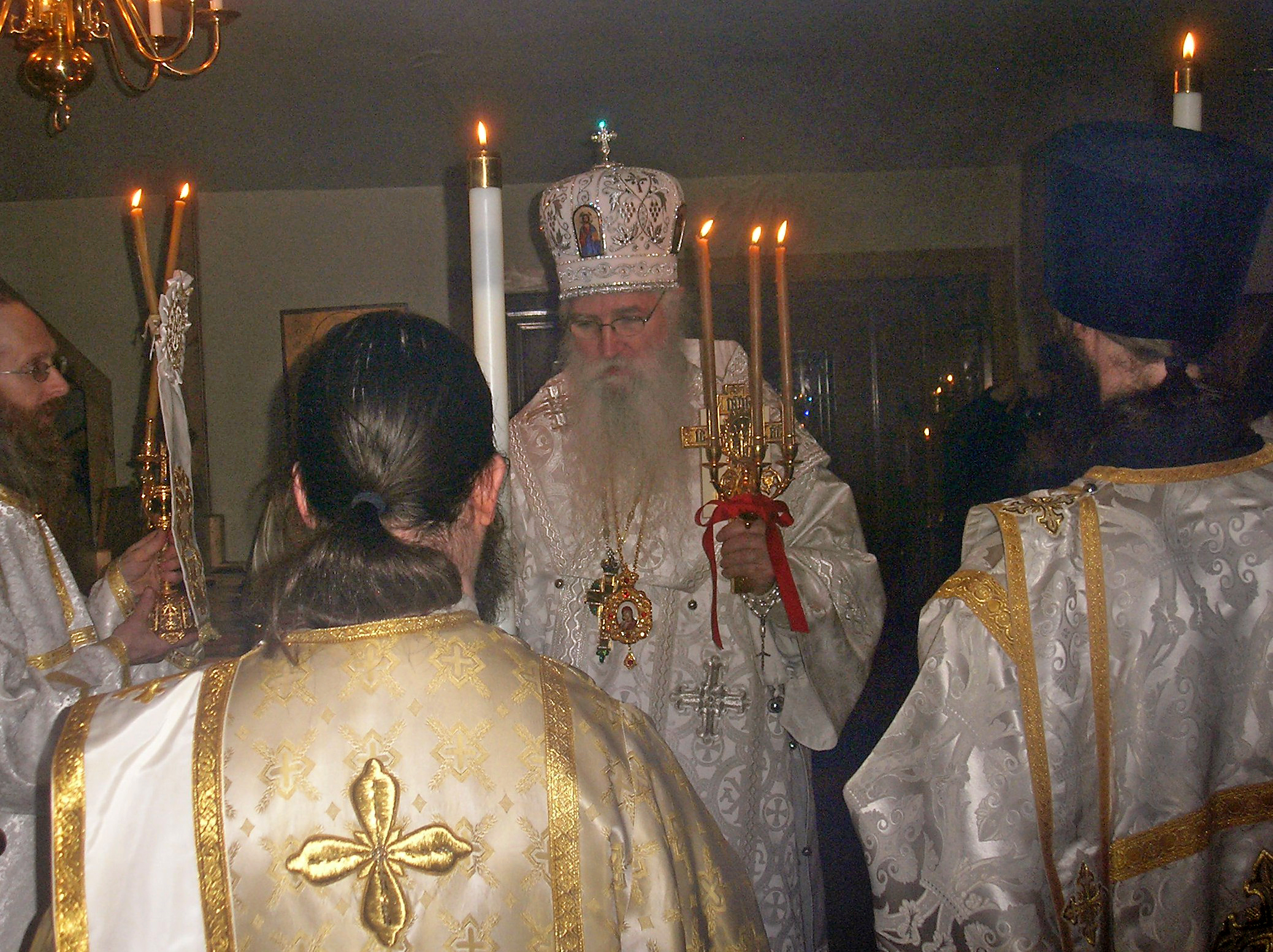
Greek Orthodox priests and deacons holding their lambades for the Holy Light ceremony

At 11 pm people wait outside their local church holding their lambades (Greek: λαμπάδες). Lambades are usually white, however parents and godparents usually give kids colourful ones (red, yellow, green, etc.).

=== Lampratzia ===
Lampratzia (/lam.braˈdʒa/) is a unique Cypriot custom. It is a large bonfire that is lit on Holy Saturday, symbolizing the burning of Judas. There are strict rules about lambratzia regarding safety.

== Easter Sunday ==
After the midnight service on Holy Saturday, Greek people have magiritsa, but in Cyprus people have avgolemono (Greek: αβγολέμονο, or in Cypriot known as αυκολέμονη), and then the egg gracking game (tsouggrisma) takes place. People hold hard-boiled eggs and try to break the other person's egg.

After the midnight service, people greet each other with the greeting Christos Anesti.
