= Serb traditions =

The Serbs have many traditions. The Slava is an exclusive custom of the Serbs, each family has one patron saint that they venerate on their feast day. The Serbian Orthodox Church uses the traditional Julian Calendar, as per which Christmas Day (December 25) falls currently on January 7 of the Gregorian Calendar, thus the Serbs celebrate Christmas on January 7, shared with the Orthodox churches of Jerusalem, orthodox Macedonians, Russians, Georgians, and the Greek Old Calendarists.

== Serbian Orthodox traditions ==
=== Slava ===
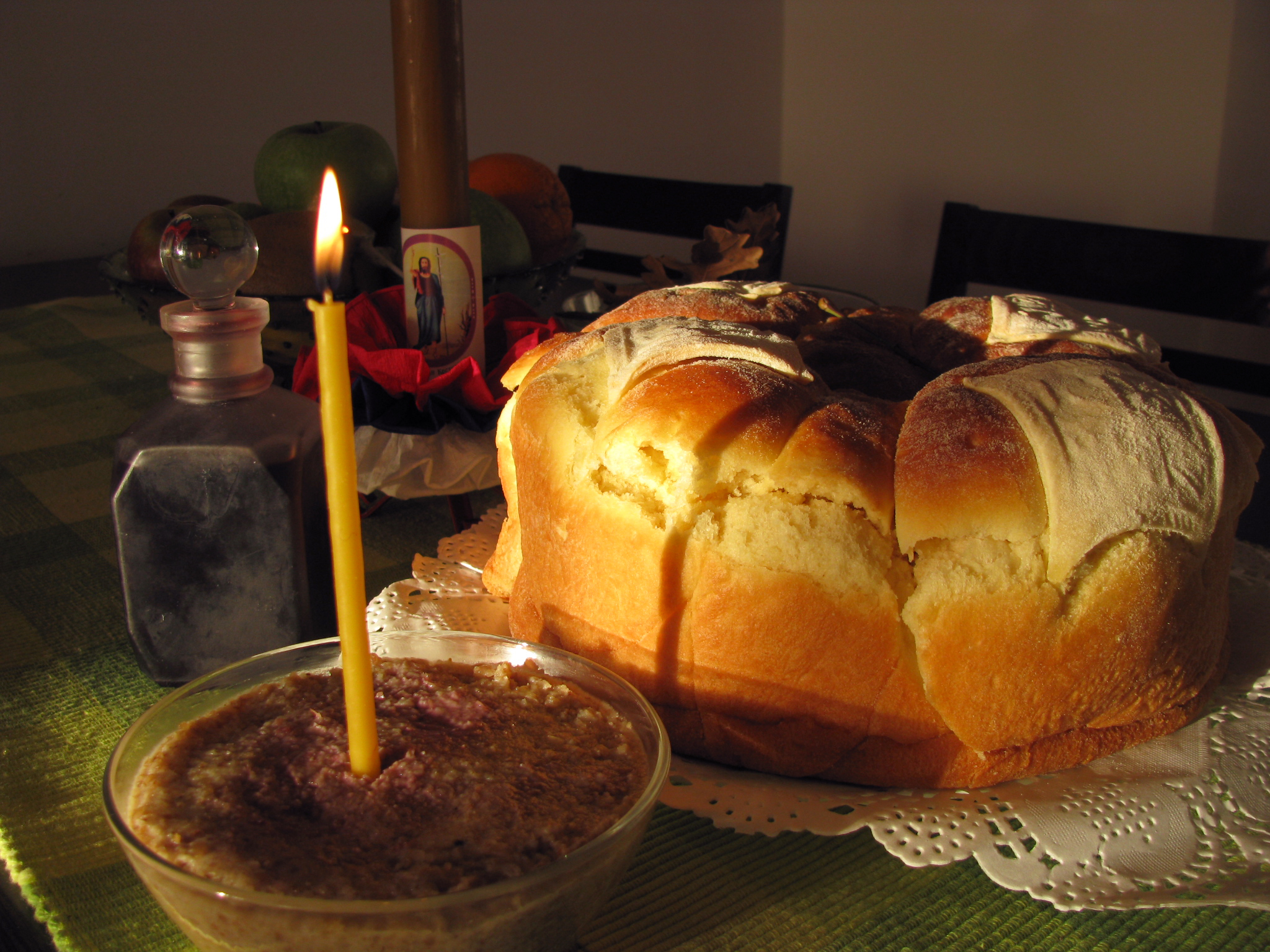
Slava prepared for a family feast in honour of their patron saint, John the Baptist.

Slava (Serbian Cyrillic: слава), also called krsna slava (крсна слава) and krsno ime (крсно име, literally "christened name"), is the Serbian Orthodox tradition of the veneration and observance of the family's patron saint. Every family has their own patron saint that they celebrate on the feast day.

The most common feast days are St. Nicholas (falling on December 19), St. George (May 6, see Đurđevdan), St. John the Baptist (January 20), Saint Demetrius (November 8) and St. Michael (November 21). Given dates are by official Gregorian calendar. Serbian Orthodox Church uses Julian calendar that is late 13 days. For example, St. Nicholas date is December 6, but by Julian calendar this date is 13 days later, when by Gregorian calendar is December 19.

=== Christmas ===
The Serbian Orthodox Church uses the traditional Julian Calendar, as per which Christmas Day (December 25) falls currently on January 7 of the Gregorian Calendar, thus the Serbs celebrate Christmas on January 7, shared with the Orthodox churches of Jerusalem, Russia, Georgia, Ukraine and the Greek Old Calendarists.

The Serbs celebrate Christmas (Serbian: Божић, romanized: Božić) for three consecutive days, beginning with Christmas Day. The Serbian Orthodox Church uses the traditional Julian Calendar, as per which Christmas Day (December 25) falls currently on January 7 of the Gregorian Calendar. This day is called by Serbs the first day of Christmas, and the following two are accordingly called the second, and the third day of Christmas. During this festive time, one is to greet another person with "Christ is Born" (Hristos se rodi) which should be responded to with "Truly He is Born" (Vaistinu se rodi).

This holiday surpasses all the other celebrated by Serbs, with respect to the diversity of applied folk customs and rituals. These may vary from region to region, some of them having modern versions adapted to the contemporary way of living. The ideal environment to carry them out fully is the traditional multi-generation country household. In the morning of Christmas Eve a Serbian Badnjak Oak (sacred tree) is felled, and a log cut from it is in the evening ceremoniously put on the domestic fire. A bundle of straw is taken into the house and spread over the floor. The dinner on this day is festive, copious and diverse in foods, although it is prepared in accordance with the rules of fasting. Groups of young people go from house to house of their village or neighborhood, congratulating the holiday, singing, and making performances; this continues through the next three days.

On Christmas Day, the celebration is announced at dawn by church bells and by shooting. Significant importance is given to the first visit a family receives that day. People expect that it will summon prosperity and well-being for their household in the ensuing year; this visit is often pre-arranged. Christmas dinner is the most celebratory meal a family has during a year. A special, festive loaf of bread is baked for this occasion. The main course is roast pork which they cook whole by rotating it on a wooden spit close to an open fire. It is not a part of Serbian traditions to exchange gifts during Christmas. Gift giving is, nevertheless, connected with the holiday, being traditionally done on the three consecutive Sundays that immediately precede it. Children, women, and men, respectively, are the set gift-givers on these three days. Closely related to Christmas is New Year's Day by the Julian calendar (January 14 on the Gregorian calendar), whose traditional folk name is Little Christmas.

- Badnjak
- Pečenica
- Koleda, a custom of a group of young men, masked and costumed, goes from house to house of their village singing special koleda songs and performing acts of magic to summon health, wealth, and prosperity for each household. The members of the group are called koledari. The koleda is carried out from the Feast of Saint Ignatius Theophorus (five days before Christmas) up until the Epiphany.
- Vertep

=== Easter ===
The archaic term for Easter is Veligdan (Serbian Cyrillic: Велигдан; from Velikdan, Serbian Cyrillic: Великдан, literally "Great Day") while Vaskrs/Uskrs (Васкрс/Ускрс) is officially in use. In these times people greet each other with the terms "Hristos vaskrse" ("Christ is Risen") and the reply "Vaistinu vaskrse" ("Truly He is Risen").

- Egg tapping
- Egg decoration

=== Lazarus Saturday ===
Vrbica (Serbian Cyrillic: Врбица) or Lazarus Saturday (Serbian: Лазарева субота, romanized: Lazareva subota), is a Serbian Orthodox tradition that has origins in the Eastern Christian feast of Lazarus Saturday, however the feast has its own features. The feast celebrates the resurrection of Lazarus of Bethany, the narrative of which is found in the Gospel of John.

The feast is also to commemorate Tsar Lazar, a national symbol and the King of Serbia who fought and died at the historical Battle of Kosovo in 1389 against the invading Ottoman Turkey. It is believed that Lazar led the procession and since the ritual (Lazarice) is held every year at his name day.

- Burning a fire against vermin and snakes
- Picking flowers and herbs which are put in water to either drink or swim in
- Lazarice ritual, a procession, parade of six maids

=== Zapis ===
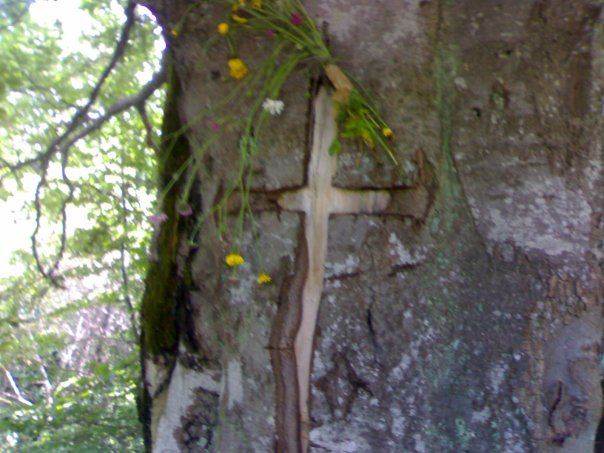
The cross inscribed in the bark of a zapis (a beech in this case) near Crna Trava.

A zapis ("inscription") is a tree in Serbia that is sacred for the village within whose bounds it is situated. A cross is inscribed into the bark of each zapis. Most of these trees are large oaks. Prayers are offered to God under the crown of the zapis, where also church services may be held, especially on village festivals observed to supplicate God for protection against destructive weather conditions. In settlements without a church, ceremonies such as weddings and baptisms used to be conducted under the tree. Folk tradition maintains that great misfortune will happen to anyone who fells a zapis. According to Serbian scholar Veselin Čajkanović, the zapis is inherited from the pre-Christian religion of the Serbs, in which it had been used as a temple.

== Cheek kissing ==
The Serbs greet close friends and family with three kisses on the cheek, starting with the right cheek and alternating. It is done between both males and females. The number three is of great importance to the Serbs. Three fingers are used when signing the cross in Orthodoxy, symbolizing the Trinity, and the Serbs, when swearing Oath, used the three fingers (collected, as when crossing) during formal and religious events, and today, the Serbian salute is made by raising three fingers wide.

The Serb way of kissing greeting is in contrast with that of the Croats, who kiss twice.

== Sources ==
- Kapor, Momo (2007). A Guide to the Serbian Mentality. Dereta. ISBN 978-86-7346-612-5.
- Mitchell, Laurence (2005). Serbia: The Bradt Travel Guide. Bradt Travel Guides. p. 77. ISBN 978-1-84162-118-0.
