= Christmas in Serbia =

Serbian customs and practices

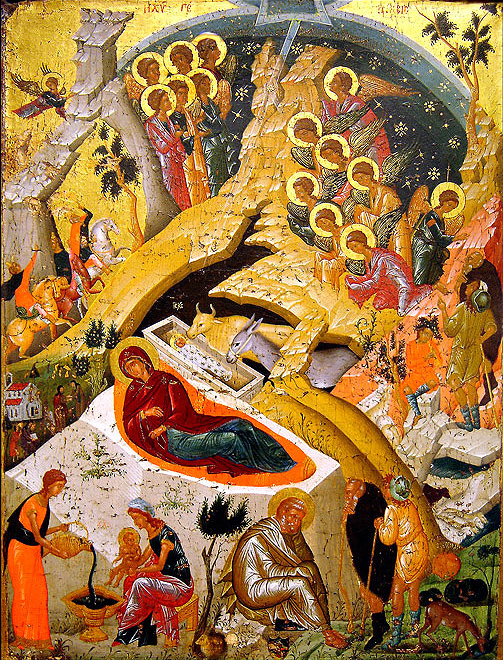
An icon representing the Nativity of Jesus Christ.

Serbian Christmas traditions are customs and practices of the Serbs associated with Christmas and a period encompassing it, between the third Sunday before Christmas Day and Epiphany. Serbian Christmas is celebrated on January 7. There are many, complex traditions connected with this period. They vary from place to place, and in many areas have been updated or watered down to suit modern living. The Serbian name for Christmas is Božić (Serbian Cyrillic: Божић, pronounced [ˈbǒʒitɕ]), which is the diminutive form of the word bog ("god"), and can be translated as "young god". Christmas is celebrated for three consecutive days, starting with Christmas Day, which the Serbs call the first day of Christmas. (Note: Christmas Day does not fall on the same day for the Serbs as for Western Christians, although they celebrate it on the same date–25 December. This is because the Serbian Orthodox Church uses the Julian calendar rather than the Gregorian one used in the West. Since 1900, the Julian calendar is 13 days behind the Gregorian calendar, and will remain so until the year 2100. During this period, 25 December in the Julian calendar–Christmas Day for the Serbs–corresponds to 7 January of the following year in the Gregorian calendar.) On these days, one is to greet another person by saying "Christ is Born," which should be responded to with "Truly He is Born," or in Serbian: "Hristos se rodi" (pronounced [xrǐstos se rôdi]) – "Vaistinu se rodi" (pronounced [ʋaǐstinu se rôdi]).

== Christmas Eve ==
The Serbian name for Christmas Eve during the day is Badnji dan, which is on January 6. After sunset it becomes Badnje veče. (Note: For the pronunciation of Serbian terms, see the section "List of terms".) On this day, the family makes preparations for the oncoming celebration. The dinner on this day is festive, copious and diverse in foods, although it is prepared in accordance with the rules of fasting.

=== Badnjak ===
The badnjak is an oak log or branch brought into the house and placed on the fire on the evening of Christmas Eve, much like a yule log in other European traditions. There are many regional variations surrounding the customs and practices connected with the badnjak.

Early in the morning the head of each family, usually accompanied by several male relatives, selects and fells the tree from which the log will be cut for their household. The group announces its departure by firing guns or small celebratory mortars called prangija. The Turkey oak is the most popular species of tree selected in most regions, but other oaks, or less frequently other kinds of tree, are also chosen. Generally, each household prepares one badnjak, although more are cut in some regions.

When the head of the household finds a suitable tree, he stands in front of it facing east. After throwing grain at the tree, he greets it with the words "Good morning and happy Christmas Eve to you", makes the Sign of the Cross, says a prayer, and kisses the tree. He then cuts it slantwise on its eastern side, using an axe. The tree should fall to the east, unhindered by surrounding trees. Its top is removed, leaving the badnjak of such a length that allows it to be carried on a man's shoulder, up to about 2.5 meters (8.2 ft) long. Once in the home, each badnjak is leaned vertically against the house beside the entrance door. In some areas, the badnjak is cut into three logs.

In the evening, a man of the family brings their badnjak into the house. If there is more than one badnjak, the thickest of them is regarded as the main one, and is brought in first. Stepping across the threshold, right foot first, the man greets his gathered family with the words "Good evening and happy Christmas Eve to you." The woman of the house greets him back, saying "May God give you well-being, and may you have good luck", or "Good luck to you, and together with you for many years to come [may we be]", or similar, before throwing grain from a sieve at the man and the badnjak he carries.

Upon entering the house the man approaches the fireplace, called ognjište ([ˈɔɡɲiːʃtɛ]) – the hearth of an ognjište is similar to a campfire, in that it has no vertical surround. He lays the badnjak down on the fire and moves it a little forward, to summon prosperity for the household. Any other logs are brought in by other males and laid on the fire parallel or perpendicular to the first. The head of the household takes a jug of wine and pours some on the badnjak; in some regions, he may strew wheat grains over the logs. He then proposes a toast: "Grant, O God, that there be health and joy in this home, that our grain and grapevines yield well, that children be born healthy to us, that our property increase in the field, pen, and barn!" or similar. The head drinks a draught of wine from the jug, after which it is passed to other members of household. When the log has burnt through, some families let the fire go out, while in others the men keep watch in shifts during the night to keep the badnjak burning.

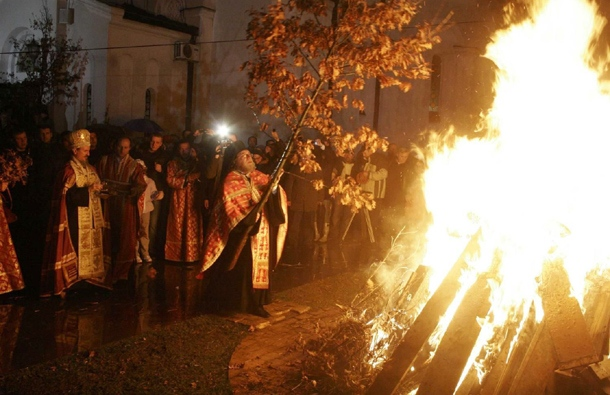
A Serbian Orthodox priest places the badnjak on the fire during Christmas Eve celebration at the Temple of Saint Sava in Belgrade.

Another type of the badnjak that has developed among the Serbs has mostly replaced the traditional log, whose burning is usually unfeasible in modern homes. It is a cluster of oak twigs with their brown leaves still attached, with which the home is decorated on the Eve. This cluster is also called the badnjak, and it is usually kept in the home until next Christmas Eve. For the convenience of those living in towns and cities, such little badnjaks can be bought at marketplaces or distributed in churches. In a common arrangement, the cluster of oak twigs is bound together with twigs of European cornel and several stalks of straw.

Since the early 1990s, the Serbian Orthodox Church has, together with local communities, organized public celebrations on Christmas Eve. There are typically three elements to such celebrations: the preparation, the ritual, and the festivity. The preparation consists of cutting down the tree to be used as the badnjak, taking it to the churchyard, and preparing drinks and food for the assembled parishioners. The ritual includes Vespers, placing the badnjak on the open fire built in the churchyard, blessing or consecrating the badnjak, and an appropriate program with songs and recitals. In some parishes, the fire on which to burn the badnjak is built not in the churchyard but at some other suitable location in their town or village. The festivity consists of gathering around the fire and socializing. Each particular celebration has its own specific traits reflecting the traditions of the local community.

=== Christmas straw ===
Immediately after the badnjak has been brought in, or immediately before in some places, an armful of straw is spread over the floor. The straw is usually brought in with the same greetings and throwing of grain as the badnjak. The person spreading it may imitate a hen clucking to call her chicks, "Kvo, kvo, kvo", with the family's children imitating chicks, "Piju, piju, piju", while they pick at the straw. A common custom is to scatter a handful of walnuts over the straw.

In Petar II Petrović-Njegoš's poem The Mountain Wreath, the plot of which takes place in 18th-century Montenegro, the holiday atmosphere on Christmas Eve is described through the words of Abbot Stefan, a main character of the poem:

Ватра плама боље него игда,
прострта је слама испод огња,
прекршћени на огњу бадњаци;
пушке пучу, врте се пецива,
гусле гуде, а кола пјевају,
с унучађу ђедови играју,
по три паса врте се у кола,
све би река једногодишници;
све радошћу дивном направњено,
а што ми се највише допада,
што свачему треба наздравити!

Vatra plama bolje nego igda,
prostrta je slama ispred ognja,
prekršćeni na ognju badnjaci;
puške puču, vrte se peciva,
gusle gude, a kola pjevaju,
s unučađu đedovi igraju,
po tri pasa vrte se u kola,
sve bi reka jednogodišnici;
sve radošću divnom naravnjeno.
A što mi se najviše dopada,
što svačemu treba nazdraviti!

The fire's burning brighter than ever,
the straw is spread in front of the fire,
Christmas logs are laid on the fire crossways;
the rifles crack, and roasts on spits do turn,
the gusle plays, and the dancers sing,
grandfathers dance with their young grandchildren,
in the kolo join three generations,
it seems they're almost of the same age;
everything is filled with bright mirth and joy.
But what I like best of all, so help me,
one has to drink a toast to everything!

=== Christmas Eve Dinner ===
Once the badnjak and straw have been taken into the house, the Christmas Eve dinner may begin. The head of household makes the Sign of the Cross, lights a candle, and censes the whole house. In some regions it is a custom that he then goes out into the yard, calls pest animals by name (e.g. wolves, foxes, and hawks) and his personal enemies, inviting them, "Come to dinner now and again in a year, God willing." This is intended to protect the household from them for a year.

Until the beginning of the 20th century in the Pirot District, southeastern Serbia, the head of household would go out to his woodpile, (Note: The woodpile and the rubbish heap, among others, are the border zones between the human and inhuman worlds in the mytho-magical world view of South Slavs. They can be used in the communication with spiritual beings and demons. See Trebješanin, Žarko. "Sorcery practise as the key to the understanding of the mytho-magical world image" (PDF). University of Niš. p. 2.) where he would invite German (pronounced [ˈɡerman]) – a male mythological being associated with bringing rain and hail. He would take with him a loaf of bread called good luck, prepared particularly for this ritual, rakia, wine, and a wax candle. At the woodpile, he would shout three times, "German, German, wherever you are, come to dinner right now, and in the summer do not let me see your eyes anywhere!" He would then light the candle, take a sip of rakia, taste some bread, drink wine, and go back into his house. Asked what happened with German, he would answer, "He came, so we dined and drank amply of rakia and wine, and then we parted." This ritual was intended to prevent summer hailstorms.

Before the table is served, it is strewn with a thin layer of straw and covered with a white cloth. The family members sit down at the table. Prior to tucking in, they all rise and a man or boy among them says a prayer, or they together sing the Troparion of the Nativity in Church Slavonic language:

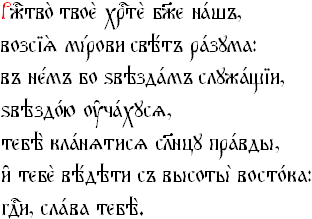

Your birth, O Christ our God,
dawned the light of knowledge upon the earth.
For by Your birth those who adored stars
were taught by a star
to worship You, the Sun of Justice,
and to know You, Orient from on High.
O Lord, glory to You.

Christmas Eve being a fast day, the dinner is prepared in accordance with that, but it is copious and diverse in foods. Besides a round unleavened loaf of bread called badnjački kolač, and salt, which are necessary, this meal may comprise roast fish, cooked beans, sauerkraut, noodles with ground walnuts, honey, and wine. It used to be served in some villages on a sack filled with straw, with the family seated around it on the floor. In the north Dalmatian region of Bukovica, a part of food that remained after the dinner used to be put on a potsherd, and taken to the rubbish heap. Wolf was there invited for dinner, "My dear wolf, do not slaughter my sheep, here you are groats! Here you are yours, and leave mine alone!"

Following dinner, young people visit their friends, a group of whom may gather at the house of one of them. The elderly narrate stories from the olden times. Christmas songs are sung, in which Christmas is treated as a male personage. The Serbian name for Christmas is Božić, which is the diminutive form of the noun bog "god", and can be translated as "young god". An old Christmas song from the Kotor Bay has the following lyrics:

Božić zove svrh planine, one visoke:
„Veselite se, Srbi braćo, vrijeme vi je!
Nalagajte krupna drva, ne cijepajte!
Sijecite suvo meso, ne mjerite!
Prostirite šenič' slamu mjesto trpeze,
a po slami trpežnjake, svilom kićene!
A odaje i pendžere lovoričicom!
A ikone i stolove masliničicom!
Utočite rujna vina, rujna crvena,
i rakije lozovače prve bokare!
Vi, đevojke i nevjeste, kola igrajte,
a vi, staro i nejako, Boga molite!“

Christmas calls from top of mountain, of that lofty one,
“Be rejoicing, O Serbs, brothers, it's time for you to!
Replenish the fire with large logs, do you not chop up!
Cut off slices of the dried meat, do you not measure!
Spread bundles of the wheaten straw instead of tables,
and over the straw – tablecloths, embellished with silk!
And the chambers and the windows – with the laurel twigs!
And the icons and the tables – with the olive twigs!
Fill glasses of the ruby wine, of the ruby red,
and the first pitchers of lozovača rakia!
You, girls and newly-wed women, do the kolo dance,
and you, old and infirm people, make prayers to God!"

The following song is sung in Bosnia and Herzegovina on the evening before Christmas Day:

Božić sjedi u travici,
u crvenoj kabanici.
Božić viče iza vode:
„Prenes'te me preko vode;
ne šalj'te mi stare babe,
stare babe temrljave,
prevaliće me;
ne šalj'te mi djevojaka,
djevojke su đavolaste,
baciće me;
ne šalj'te mi nevjestice,
nevjestice veziljice,
ubošće me;
već mi šalj'te domaćina
da me preveze,
domaćin će slaviti me
dovijeka svog.“

Christmas is seated in the grass,
clothèd in a red overcoat.
He calls from across the water,
"Carry me over the water;
do not send me old grandmothers,
old grandmothers are feeblish,
they will let me fall;
do not send me youthful damsels,
youthful damsels are frolicsome,
they will throw me;
do not send little brides to me,
little brides are embroiderers,
they will prick me;
but send me a head of household
to take me across,
household head will celebrate me
as long as he lives."

It is a custom in the region of Banat that, after Christmas Eve dinner, groups of children go from house to house of their neighborhood and sing to neighbors. This custom is called korinđanje, and the children who participate in it are called korinđaši. They knock on a neighbor's door or ring the doorbell; when the neighbor comes out they greet him, and ask if they are allowed to sing. If the answer is affirmative, they sing a children's ditty or the Troparion of the Nativity. As a reward, the neighbor gives them candies or even money; more traditional gifts include walnuts, prunes, apples, and cakes. Not only can Serbian children be korinđaši, but also Romanian and Hungarian ones.

In central Serbia, once the household members have gone to bed, an elderly woman of the family sticks a knife into the house door from the inside. Alternatively, she puts a hawthorn stake by the door, hanging a wreath of garlic on it. This is done as a protection against curses, witches, and demons. For the same reason, children are rubbed with garlic on the palms, armpits, and soles before going to bed. In some regions, the men keep watch in shifts by the fireplace during the night, to keep the fire burning.

== Christmas ==
On Christmas Day, the celebration is announced at dawn by church bells, and by shooting from guns and prangijas. The head of household and some of the family go to church to attend the Morning Liturgy. No one is to eat anything before tasting the prosphora, which the head of household brings from church for those who stay at home to do domestic tasks for this morning.

The Serbs native to the Slovenian region of White Carniola traditionally try to see only healthy and prosperous people on this day. The Serbs of Timiș County in Romania have since the interwar period adopted the custom of erecting in their homes a Christmas tree, which they call krisindla, after the German Christkindl. On Christmas Day children sing little songs, at the beginning of which Christmas is said to knock or tread loudly. This may be understood as a theophany: by the sound, Young God makes his arrival known to people. The following are the lyrics of two of such songs:

Božić štapom bata,
nosi suva zlata
od vrata do vrata.
Na čija će vrata
dat' blagoslov, zlata?
Na naša će vrata
prosut' šaku zlata.

Christmas knocks with a stick, (Note: The first verse of both of these songs includes the word бата (bata), 3rd person singular present of the verb батати (batati), rarely used in modern Serbian. This verb can mean 'to knock', 'to bang' (see Čajkanović), or 'to tread loudly' (see Dimitrijević). This word is a homograph with the word бата (bata), a hypocoristic of the word брат (brat) which means brother and so sometimes the two could be mistaken.)
he carries solid gold
from a door to a door.
Upon whose door will he
give his blessing and gold?
Upon our door he will
spill a handful of gold.

Božić, Božić bata,
nosi kitu zlata
da pozlati vrata,
i od boja do boja,
i svu kuću do krova!

Christmas, Christmas treads loud,
carries a clump of gold
to make golden the door,
and also, from floor to floor,
all the house to the rooftop!

=== Polažajnik ===
A polažajnik (položajnik), polaženik (položenik), podlaznik, polaznik, pohodnik, or radovan, is the first person who visits the family on Christmas Day. This visit may be fortuitous or pre-arranged. People expect that it will summon prosperity and well-being for their household in the ensuing year. A family often picks in advance a man or boy, and arranges that he visit them on Christmas morning. If this proves to be lucky for the family, he is invited again next year to be the polažajnik. If not, they send word to him not to come any more in that capacity.

A polažajnik steps into the house with his right foot first, greeting the gathered family, "Christ is Born, Happy Christmas." He carries grain in his glove, which he shakes out before the threshold, or throws at the family members. They respond with "Truly He is Born," and throw grain at the polažajnik. He then approaches the fireplace, takes a poker or a branch, and strikes repeatedly the burning badnjak to make sparks fly from it. At the same time he utters these words (or similar):

Колико варница, толико среће у овој кући. Колико варница, толико у домаћинском џепу новца. Колико варница, толико у тору оваца. Колико варница, толико прасади и јагањаца. Колико варница, толико гусака и пилади, а највише здраља и весеља.	How many sparks, that much happiness in this house. How many sparks, that much money in the household head's pocket. How many sparks, that many sheep in the pen. How many sparks, that many pigs and lambs. How many sparks, that many geese and chickens, and most of all, health and joy.

Having said that, he moves the log a little forward and throws a coin into the fire. The woman of the house puts a woolen blanket on the polaznik's back, and seats him on a low stool by the fireplace. At the moment when he sits down, they try to pull away the stool beneath him, as if to make him fall on the floor. In rural communities the polaznik goes out into the yard, and throws grain inside a circle made with the rope with which Christmas straw has been tied, calling chickens. When they gather in the circle he catches a rooster, whose head is then cut off by him or the head of household on the house's threshold. The rooster will be roasted on a wooden spit as part of Christmas dinner. The polaznik usually stays for dinner with the family. He receives a gift in the form of a round cake with an embedded coin, and a towel, shirt, socks, or some other useful item.

A custom to use a domestic animal as a polaznik was kept in some regions until the first half of the 20th century. A sheep, ox, swine, or calf was led into the house on Christmas morning. In the west Serbian region of Rađevina, centered on the town of Krupanj, the head of household would place a sheep between himself and the fireplace, and pronounce the aforementioned words while striking the badnjak with a branch cut from it. In the region of Bihor, north-eastern Montenegro, a round loaf of bread with a hole in its center was prepared; four grooves were impressed into its surface along two mutually perpendicular diameters of the loaf. After an ox was led into the house, the loaf was put on his horn, and some grain was thrown on the ox. Yanking his head, the ox would throw off the loaf; having fallen down, the loaf would break into four pieces along the grooves. The pieces were picked up and distributed among the family members. This custom was preserved up to the 1950s even in some Muslim families of the region. Ethnologists consider that the animal polažajnik is more ancient than the human one.

=== Strong water ===
A girl or woman goes early in the morning to a resource of water, as a well, spring, or stream. After she puts by the water an ear of maize and a bunch of basil which she has brought from home, she collects water with a bucket, and takes it home to her family. This water collected on early Christmas morning is called the strong water, and is believed to possess a special beneficial power. Each member of the family washes the face with it, and drinks it before breakfast; infants are bathed in it. On her way back home, the girl who carries the strong water picks several cornel or willow twigs, with which children are lightly struck that morning. This is intended to strengthen their health. (Note: There is a Serbian saying for a healthy person: zdrav kao dren, "as healthy as cornel".)

=== Christmas dinner ===
==== Česnica ====
An indispensable part of Christmas dinner is the česnica, a round loaf of bread. The preparation of this bread may be accompanied by various rules and rituals. The dough for it is sometimes prepared with the strong water. A widespread custom is to put a coin into the dough; regionally, little objects made of cornel wood may be inserted, representing chickens, oxen, cows, swine, bees, etc.

In Vojvodina a different, sweet cake/pie variety of česnica is made, using walnuts, honey and special pie breading.

In addition to the česnica, other kinds of Christmas loaves may be baked, each with its specific name and purpose within the celebration. The božićni kolač is a round loaf with a Christogram impressed with a wooden seal on its upper surface. For each male member of the family a round loaf named ratarica may be prepared – the biggest one for the head, and the smallest one for the youngest boy. For each female member a pletenica may be baked, a loaf shaped like a three-strand braid

==== Tucindan ====
On Christmas Eve, the men of the family build a fire in their house yard, and roast a pig, or a sheep in some areas, on a long wooden spit. The whole roasted pig or sheep, called pečenica, is a traditional part of Christmas dinner. People who raise their own swine dedicate one for the pečenica a month or two before, and feed it with better fodder. It is traditionally killed on Tucindan, the day before Christmas Eve, by hitting on the head with a lump of salt. Its throat was then cut, the blood being collected and mixed with fodder. Feeding cattle with this mixture was believed to make them thrive. The name Tucindan is derived from the verb tući "to beat". The roasted pečenica may be brought into the house with a ritual similar to that of bringing in the badnjak.

==== Meal ====
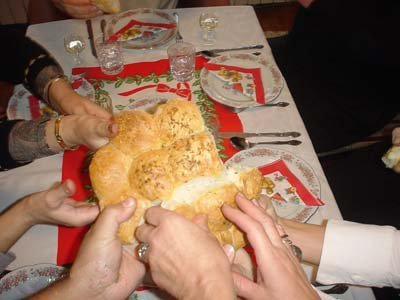
Family members break a česnica at the beginning of Christmas dinner.

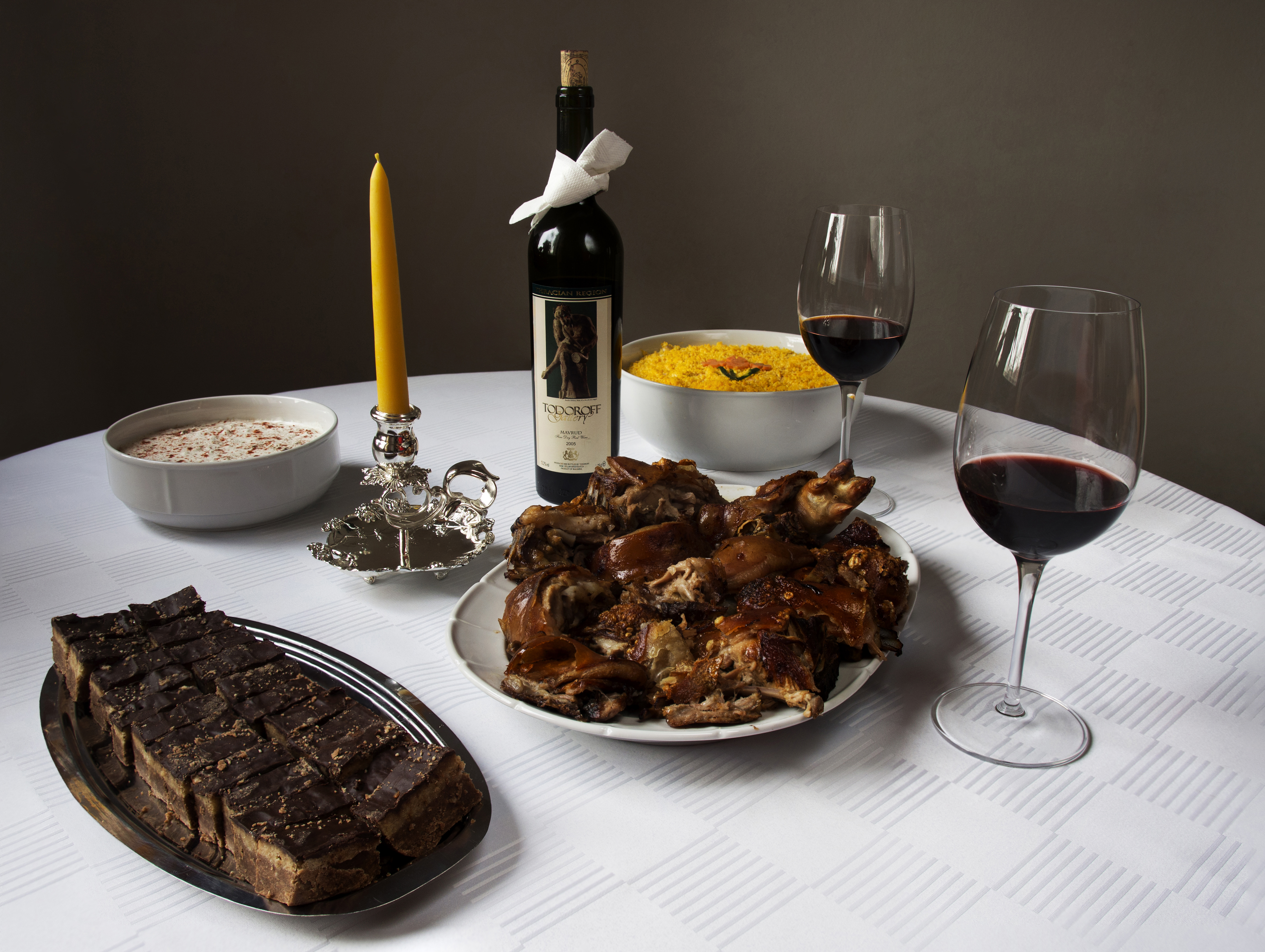
An example of a Christmas table in Serbia; grilled pork, Olivier salad (also called Russian salad), dzadziki salad, red wine and Bajadera sweets

Christmas dinner is the most celebratory meal a family has during a year. About noon, or even earlier, the family members sit down at the table. When the head of household gives a sign, all rise. He lights a candle, censes his family and house, and prays the Lord's Prayer. After that, the family members kiss each other on the cheek saying, "The peace of God among us, Christ is Born." The head and another man of the family hold the česnica between themselves, rotating it three times counterclockwise. The česnica is then carefully broken among the relatives, so that each of them gets his or her own share of the loaf. The family member whose share contains the coin hidden in the česnica, will supposedly be exceptionally lucky in the coming year. The main course of Christmas dinner is roast pork of the pečenica. During the dinner, the head of household proposes a toast to his family with a glass of wine, several times. A traditional toast from parts of Bosnia and Herzegovina goes like this:

Sjaj Bože i Božiću,
kućnjem šljemenu i sjemenu,
volu i težaku, kozici i ovčici,
putniku namjerniku, ribici u vodici, ptici u gorici!
Sjaj Bože i Božiću,
Meni domaćinu i mome plemenu i šljemenu!

Shine, O God and Christmas,
on the rooftop and children of the house,
on the ox and farmer, the goat and sheep,
on the traveler, the fish in water, the bird in a mountain!
Shine, O God and Christmas,
on me, the head of household, and on my family and rooftop!

After Christmas dinner, the remaining food should not be removed from the table – only the used tableware is taken away. The food is covered with a white cloth, and eaten in the evening as supper.

=== Koleda ===
The koleda was a custom that a group of young men, masked and costumed, went from house to house of their village singing special koleda songs and performing acts of magic intended to summon health, wealth, and prosperity for each household. The members of the group were called koledari. The koleda was carried out from the Feast of Saint Ignatius Theophorus (five days before Christmas) up until the Epiphany. This custom was best preserved in the upper Pčinja District, and in the region around the South Morava River in the Jablanica District, southeastern Serbia. Regarded as pagan and discouraged by the Serbian Orthodox Church, the koleda ceased to be performed among most of the Serbs during the 19th and 20th centuries.

Koledari prepared themselves during several days before the start of the koleda: they practiced the koleda songs, and made their masks and costumes. The masks could be classified into three types according to the characters they represented: the anthropomorphic, the zoomorphic (representing bear, cow, stag, goat, sheep, ox, wolf, stork, etc.), and the anthropo-zoomorphic. The main material from which they were produced was hide. The face, however, could be made separately out of a dried gourd shell or a piece of wood, and then sewn to hide so that the mask could cover all the head. The moustache, beard, and eyebrows were made with black wool, horsehair, or hemp fibers, and the teeth with beans. Zoomorphic and anthropo-zoomorphic masks might have white, black, or red painted horns attached to them. The costumes were prepared from ragged clothes, sheepskins with the wool turned outside, and calf hides. An ox tail with a bell fixed at its end was sometimes attached at the back of them.

The leader of the group was called Grandpa. The other koledari gathered at his house on the eve of koleda, and at midnight they all went out and started their activities. Walking through the streets of the village they shouted and made noise with their bells and ratchets. Most were armed with sabers or clubs. One of them, called Bride, was masked and costumed as a pregnant woman. He held a distaff in his hand and spun hemp fibers. The koledari teased and joked with Bride, which gave a comic note to the koleda. Some of them were called alosniks, the men possessed by the demon ala. There could have been other named characters in the group.

The koledari sung special songs, in which the word koledo, the vocative case of koleda, was inserted in the middle and at the end of each verse. Vuk Stefanović Karadžić recorded in the 19th century the lyrics of a number of the koleda songs, including the following one, which koledari sung while entering a house:

Dobar veče, koledo, domaćine, koledo!
Zatekosmo gde večera,
na trpezi vino pije,
tvoj govedar kod goveda.
Krave ti se istelile,
sve volove vitoroge;
kobile se iždrebile,
sve konjice putonoge;
ovce ti se izjagnjile,
sve ovčice svilorune.
Čobanin se naslonio
na grančicu oraovu.
Tud prolazi mlada moma,
da potkine tu grančicu.
Progovara čobanine:
„Devojčice, belo lice,
ko ti reza bornu suknju,
u skutovi razboritu,
u pojasu saboritu?“
„Imam brata baš-terziju,
te mi reza bornu suknju,
u skutovi razboritu,
u pojasu saboritu.“

Good evening, koledo, head of household, koledo!
We've found him eat the evening meal,
and drink of wine at a table,
your cow herder, by your cattle.
May all of your cows be calving
nothing but the twist-horned oxen;
may all of your mares be foaling
nothing but the colts with stockings;
may all of your ewes be lambing
nothing but the silken-wooled sheep.
A sheep herder has leaned himself
on a slender stick of walnut.
There passes by a young damsel
to pull away that slender stick.
The sheep herder begins to speak,
"Little damsel with the white face,
who has fashioned your pleated dress,
along the skirt, with spreading pleats,
at the waistline, with gathered pleats?"
"My brother is tailor-in-chief,
he has fashioned my pleated dress,
along the skirt, with spreading pleats,
at the waistline, with gathered pleats."

In the following song, also recorded by Vuk Stefanović Karadžić, the badnjak and Christmas were referred to as male personages. An opposition was made between the former, described as old, and the latter, described as young. Koledari sung it to the household head in whose home they came:

Domaćine, koledo, gospodine, koledo!
Zastasmo te za večerom,
gde večeru ti večeraš,
belim grlom vino piješ,
i očima biser brojiš,
i rukama gajtan pleteš.
Dodaj nama kraj gajtana,
na čem ćemo Boga molit
za staroga - za Badnjaka,
za mladoga - za Božića.

Head of household, koledo, honored master, koledo!
We've found you at the evening meal:
you are eating your evening meal,
with the white throat drinking of wine,
and with the eyes counting up pearls,
and with the hands knitting ribbon.
Pass the end of ribbon to us,
on which we will pray to the God
for the old one - for the Badnjak,
for the young one - for the Christmas.

Besides the singing, the koledari also chased away demons from the household. First they searched the house to find out where the demons hide. They looked everywhere, at the same time shouting, dancing, jumping, knocking on the floor and walls with sticks, and teasing Bride. When they found the demons, they drove them out of the hiding place, and fought with them swinging their sabers and clubs. After the demons were chased away, the koledari briefly danced the kolo, and then blessed the household. As a reward, they received a loaf of bread which the family prepared specially for them, and other food gifts.

=== Vertep ===
On Christmas Eve and Day, a group of boys dressed in variegated costumes goes from house to house of their village carrying a vertep – a litter constructed as a wooden model of a house or a church. The name vertep comes from the Church Slavonic вєртє́пъ (pronounced [ʋerˈtep], "cave"), referring to the cave that housed the manger in which newborn Jesus Christ was laid. There are two dolls inside the litter: one represents the Theotokos, and the other, laid in a model of a manger, represents the Christ Child; the floor is spread with straw. This custom is called vertep, and the boys participating in it are the vertepaši. In front of each house they sing Christmas songs, and recite poems that praise the birth of Christ. Similarly to koledari, vertepaši are armed with wooden swords and fence with each other in front of houses. Vertep could be regarded as a Christianized form of the koleda. This custom is mainly present among the Serbs of Vojvodina.

=== Second and third day of Christmas ===
Christmas is celebrated for three days. On the second day of Christmas, neighbors visit each other. On the third day, Christmas straw is taken out of the house. Little bundles are made with it, and hung on fruit trees to make their fruit better. A bigger bundle may be stored in a dry place: it will be burned on Đurđevdan, as a protection of fields against hail. Another bundle is taken away across the nearest stream – a symbolic elimination of all the vermin that may be present in the house. Men make crosses from the remnant of the thicker side of badnjak, and stick them under eaves, on fields, meadows, vineyards, and apiaries. It is believed this will help that the ensuing year be happy and fruitful. A good sign that this will be the case is when there is a lot of snow on Christmas Day.

The third day of Christmas coincides with Saint Stephen's Day, which is the slava of many Serbian families. In this way, many Serbs celebrate two important holidays, Christmas and slava, within three days.

== Twelve Days of Christmas ==
During the Twelve Days of Christmas (7 January – 18 January on the Gregorian calendar), one is to greet another person with "Christ is Born," which should be responded to with "Truly He is Born," or in Serbian Latin: "Hristos se rodi" (pronounced [ˈxristɔs.sɛ ˈrɔdi]) – "Vaistinu se rodi" (pronounced [ˈʋa.istinusɛ ˈrɔdi]).

January 14 on the Gregorian calendar corresponds to January 1, New Year's Day, on the Julian calendar; this holiday is also called Mali Božić (Serbian Cyrillic: Мали Божић, pronounced [ˈmaːliː ˈboʒit͡ɕ], "Little Christmas"). In some regions, the head and the right Boston butt of the pečenica are set aside at the Christmas dinner, and are served for dinner on this day. A part of this meal may consist of little round loaves made with cornmeal and cream. The loaves are named vasilica after Saint Basil the Great, because January 1 is also the feast day of this saint. People versed in scapulimancy used the shoulder blade of the Boston butt to foretell events concerning the family in the ensuing year. The snout cut from the head of pečenica could have been used in love magic. If a girl looked stealthily through the snout at a boy she wanted, who was not interested in her, he would supposedly go mad about her.

On the day before Little Christmas, especially in south-eastern Serbia, a group of young unmarried men went through the streets of their village and chased away demons by making a deafening noise. Sirovari, as these men were called, shouted as loud as possible two words, "Sirovo burovo!" accompanied by the noise made with bells, ratchets, and horseshoes strung on a rope. The group consisted of seven, nine or eleven members; it was said that if there were an even number of sirovari, one of them would die within a year. Moving through the village, they tried to make it impossible for anyone to count them. They constantly changed positions in the group, hid and suddenly reappeared. Villagers were glad to receive them in their homes, and treated them with food and drink.

The following custom was recorded at the end of the 19th century in the north Dalmatian region of Bukovica. Early in the morning of Little Christmas, children of the family spread Christmas straw from their house around the stake in the center of their village's threshing floor. The use of this stake was to tether a horse to it; the animal was then driven around to thresh grain by treading with its hooves. The woman of the house baked a big round unleavened loaf of bread with a hole in its center, inscribed with circles, crosses, hooks, and other symbols on its surface. The loaf was taken to the threshing floor, and fixed round the stake. The oldest man of the family would take hold of the stake with his right hand above the loaf. With his left hand he held the right hand of the next oldest man, and so on to the youngest boy who could walk steadily. Holding hands in this manner, they would run around the stake three times. During the running they would shout in unison as loud as possible, "Ajd ajde, koba moja!" meaning "Giddy-up, my mare!" – except for the man holding the stake, who would shout, "De! De! De!" meaning "Go! Go! Go!" They would then take the hollow loaf back home, and put it near the fireplace beside the remnant of badnjak. The woman of the house would "feed them fodder", i.e., prepare a meal for them, consisting of đevenica (a sort of dried sausage), roast pork, and the hollow loaf, plus rakia for the adults. Having eaten, they would go back to the threshing floor and repeat the whole ritual, only this time without the loaf. In the end, they would collect Christmas straw from the threshing floor; it was put in hens' nests to prevent them from laying eggs outside the nests. This custom was considered as especially joyful for children.

The last of the Twelve Days of Christmas, January 18 (January 5 on the Julian calendar), is the eve of the Epiphany. Its folk name is Krstovdan (Note: This Krstovdan should not be confused with the Feast of Exaltation of the Cross, whose folk name in Serbian is also Krstovdan.) – the Day of the Cross. This is a strict fast day; the adults should eat almost nothing. It was believed that the north, south, east, and west winds crossed each other on Krstovdan. The wind that overpowered the other three, would be dominant in the ensuing year.

This twelve-day period used to be called the unbaptized days, during which the demonic forces of all kinds were considered to be more than usually active and dangerous. People were cautious not to attract their attention, and did not go out late at night. The latter precaution was especially because of the demons called karakondžula, imagined as heavy, squat, and ugly creatures. When a karakondžula found someone outdoors during the night of an unbaptized day, it would jump on his back, and make him carry it wherever it wanted. This torture would end only when roosters announced the dawn; at that moment the creature would release its victim and run away.

== Gifts ==
Gift giving on Christmas is not a Serbian tradition –instead, gifts are given on the three Sundays before Christmas Day. These three holidays are called Detinjci or Djetinjci, Materice, and Oci. Children give gifts on Detinjci, married women on Materice, and married men on Oci. The best presents are exchanged between parents and their children.

The gifts are given in the form of a ransom. In the morning of Detinjci, the adults use a belt, rope, or scarf to tie their and neighbors' children, binding their legs. The children have already prepared presents for this event, with which they "pay the ransom" and get untied. In the morning of Materice, the children suddenly tie their mother, who asks, as if surprised, why she has been tied. The children then wish a happy Feast of Materice to her, and she pays the ransom with the prepared presents. They may do the same with married women from their neighborhood. Mothers prepare a family feast on this day. In the morning of Oci, the Sunday immediately before Christmas Day, the children tie their father. Out of these three holidays, Materice is the most festive. It's worth noting that majority of Serbian population however does not follow the traditions of "Detinjci, Materice and Oci", and if there's gift giving involved it usually takes place on Christmas Eve. This mostly occurs in Vojvodina, as the province boasts a significant Protestant and Catholic populations which has led to some intertwining of customs. Churches in small rural villages will usually provide local children with gifts before Christmas.

== List of terms ==
The following is a list of Serbian terms related to Christmas, written in the Serbian Latin alphabet and the Serbian Cyrillic alphabet, with pronunciations transcribed in the IPA (see Help:IPA/Serbo-Croatian).

Serbian Cyrillic alphabet	Serbian Latin alphabet	IPA	Explanation
бадњачар	badnjačar	[ˈbadɲat͡ʃaːr]	The man who takes the badnjak into house on Christmas Eve
бадњачки колач	badnjački kolač	[ˈbadɲaːt͡ʃkiː ˈkolaːt͡ʃ]	A loaf necessary for Christmas Eve dinner
бадњак	badnjak	[ˈbadɲaːk]	The oak log that burns on an fireplace during Christmas Eve and Day, or in church yard on Christmas Eve; leaved oak twigs burnt instead of the whole tree, or used as an ornament in house during Christmas
Бадње вече	Badnje veče	[ˈbadɲeː ˈʋet͡ʃeː]	Christmas Eve after the sunset
Бадњи дан	Badnji dan	[ˈbadɲiː ˈdaːn]	Christmas Eve before the sunset
Божић	Božić	[ˈboʒit͡ɕ]	Christmas
божићни колач	božićni kolač	[ˈboʒit͡ɕniː ˈkolaːt͡ʃ]	A kind of Christmas loaf
чесница	česnica	[ˈt͡ʃeːsnit͡sa]	A Christmas loaf, necessary for Christmas dinner
Детињци, Дјетињци	Detinjci, Djetinjci	[ˈdetiːɲt͡si], [ˈdjetiːɲt͡si]	The third Sunday before Christmas, when children give presents
Герман	German	[ˈɡerman]	A spirit with an influence on rain and hail
караконџула	karakondžula	[karaˈkond͡ʒula]	A demon
коледа	koleda	[ˈkoleda]	A Christmas custom
коледари	koledari	[ˈkoledaːri]	Participants in the koleda (koledarenje)
коринђање	korinđanje	[koˈrind͡ʑaɲe]	A Christmas custom
коринђаши	korinđaši	[korinˈd͡ʑaːʃi]	Participants in the korinđanje
Крстовдан	Krstovdan	[ˈkrs.toʋ.daːn]	The day before the Epiphany
Мали Божић	Mali Božić	[ˈmaːliː ˈboʒit͡ɕ]	A folk name for New Year's Day according to the Julian Calendar, literally Little Christmas; coincides with the Feast of Saint Basil the Great
Материце	Materice	[ˈmaterit͡se]	The second Sunday before Christmas, when married women give presents
Оци	Oci	[ˈot͡si]	The Sunday immediately before Christmas, when married men give presents
огњиште	ognjište	[ˈoɡɲiːʃte]	An indoor fireplace without a vertical surround, so the fire burning on it is similar to a campfire.
печеница	pečenica	[peˈt͡ʃenit͡sa]	A whole pig roasted for Christmas dinner
плетеница	pletenica	[pleˈtenit͡sa]	A kind of Christmas loaf
полoжајник	položajnik	[ˈpoloʒaːjnik]	The first person who visits a family during Christmas
прангија	prangija	[ˈpraŋɡija]	A small celebratory mortar
ратарица	ratarica	[raˈtarit͡sa]	A kind of Christmas loaf
сировари	sirovari	[ˈsirovaːri]	A Christmas custom, and its participants
Туциндан	Tucindan	[ˈtuːt͡sindaːn]	The day before Christmas Eve, when the pig for a pečenica is ritualistically slaughtered
василица	vasilica	[ʋaˈsilit͡sa]	A little round loaf made with cornmeal and cream, eaten for dinner on Mali Božić
вертеп	vertep	[ˈʋertep]	A Christmas custom
вертепаши	vertepaši	[ʋerteˈpaːʃi]	Participants in the vertep

== See also ==
- Serbian traditions
