= Vertep (Serbian) =

Serbian Orthodox Christmas custom

The Vertep is a Serbian Orthodox Christmas custom commonly practiced by the young male members of the Serbian Orthodox Church. It is usually performed on January 6, the Christmas Eve of the Orthodox calendar. This custom is called vertep (Serbian Cyrillic: вертеп, and the participants in it – vertepaši (вертепаши; singular: vertepaš, вертепаш).

The word “vertep” comes from the Church Slavonic: вєртє́пъ [ʋerˈtep], lit. 'cave', which refers to the birthplace of Jesus.

== See also ==
- Vertep theatre, a custom among East Slavic ethnic groups
