= Lazarus Saturday =

Moveable feast in Eastern Christianity

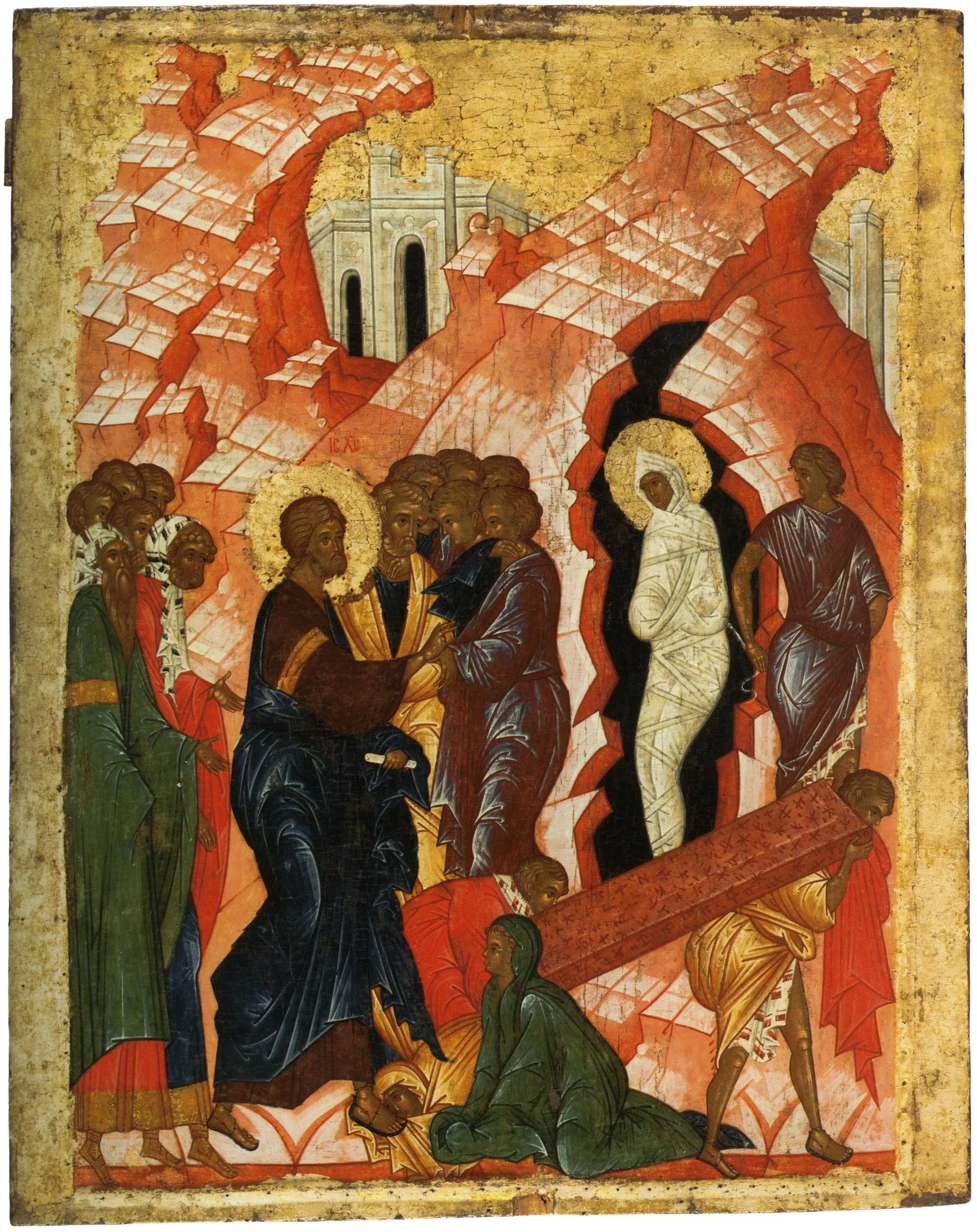
- The Raising of Lazarus — 15th century. Novgorod school. 72 x 60 cm. The Russian Museum, St. Petersburg, Russia
- Also called: List: Bulgarian: Лазаровден, romanized: Lazarovden; Greek: Λαζαροσάββατο, romanized: Lazarosabbato; Russian: Лазарева суббота, romanized: Lazareva Subbota; Serbian: Врбица, romanized: Vrbica or Лазарева субота romanized: Lazarova Subota
- Observed by: Oriental and Eastern Orthodox Christians
- Type: Eastern Christian
- Date: Variable (depends on the paschal computus)
- 2025 date: 12 April
- 2026 date: 4 April
- 2027 date: 24 April
- Frequency: Annual
- Related to: Raising of Lazarus, Great Lent, Palm Sunday

Lazarus Saturday in Eastern Christianity (consisting of the Eastern Orthodox, Oriental Orthodox, and Eastern Catholic Churches) refers to the moveable feast before Palm Sunday to which it is liturgically linked. It celebrates the raising of Lazarus of Bethany. Bethany is recorded in the New Testament as a small village in Judaea, the home of the siblings Mary of Bethany, Martha, and Lazarus, as well as that of Simon the Leper.

John's gospel reports that "Six days before the Passover, Jesus came to Bethany, where Lazarus lived, whom Jesus had raised from the dead." Presumably, it is where he spent the Great Sabbath that occurs immediately before Passover, prior to his triumphal entry into Jerusalem. Jesus is reported to have lodged there during Holy Week, and it is where his anointing by Lazarus' sister Mary took place a few days later on Holy Wednesday.

== History ==
The antiquity of this commemoration is demonstrated by the homilies of St. John Chrysostom (349–407), St Augustine of Hippo Regia (354–430), and others. In the 7th and 8th centuries, special hymns and canons for the feast were written by St. Andrew of Crete, St. Cosmas of Maium and St. John Damascene, which are still sung to this day.

== Liturgical aspects ==
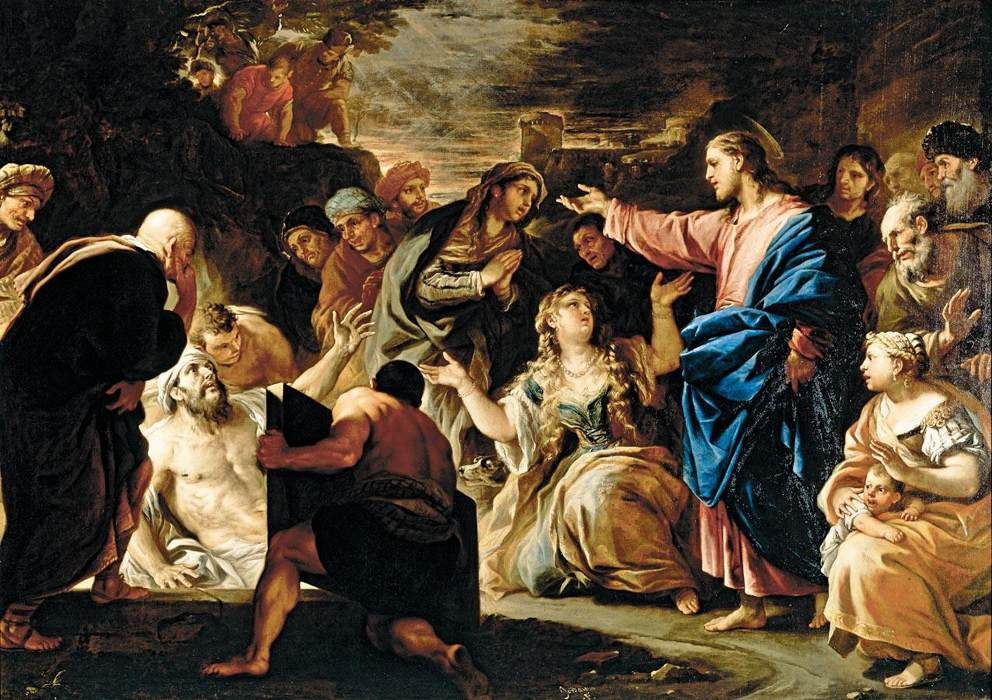
The Raising of Lazarus — Oil on canvas of Luca Giordano. 1675 c. Naples, from private collection. Italy

Lazarus Saturday and Palm Sunday together hold a unique position in the church year, as days of joy and triumph interposed between the penitence of Great Lent and the mourning of Holy Week.

=== Divine services ===
During the preceding week the propers in the Lenten Triodion track the sickness and then the death of Lazarus, and Christ's journey from beyond Jordan to Bethany. This week is referred to as the "Week of Palms" or the "Flowery Week."

The position of Lazarus Saturday is summed up in the first sticheron chanted at vespers on Friday: (Note: The Orthodox Church follows the Jewish tradition of beginning the day at sunset; thus, Lazarus Saturday begins at Friday vespers.)

Having completed the forty days that bring profit to our soul, we beseech Thee in Thy love for man: Grant us also to behold the Holy Week of Thy Passion, that in it we may glorify Thy mighty acts and Thine ineffable dispensation for our sakes, singing with one mind: O Lord, glory to Thee.

During Friday vespers the reading of Genesis (which began on the first day of Great Lent) is concluded with the description of the death, burial and mourning of Jacob (Genesis 49:33–50:26) and on Friday night, at compline, a Canon on the Raising of Lazarus by Saint Andrew of Crete is sung; this is a rare full canon, having all nine canticles.

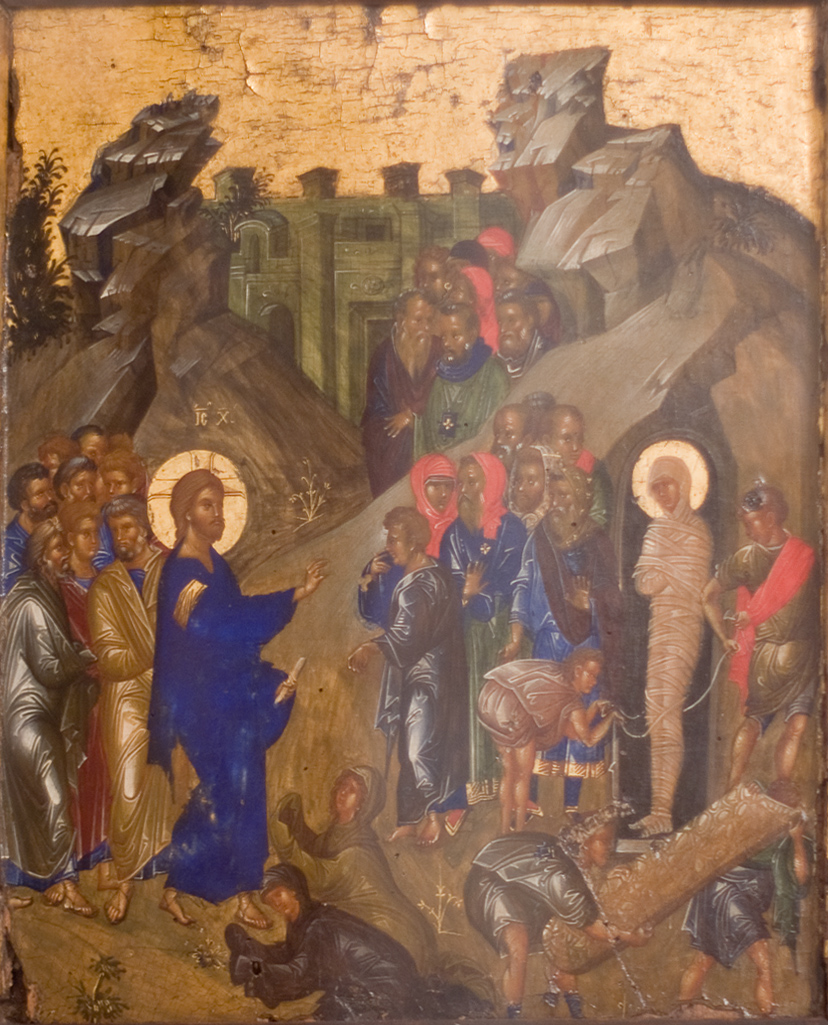
The Raising of Lazarus — Late 14th — early 15th Century. Byzantium From the Collection of G. Gamon-Gumun. Russian museum

The scripture readings and hymns for this day focus on the raising of Lazarus as a foreshadowing of the Resurrection of Christ and a prefiguring of the General Resurrection. The Gospel narrative is interpreted in the hymns as illustrating the two natures of Christ: his humanity in asking, "Where have ye laid him?" (John 11:34), and his divinity by commanding Lazarus to come forth from the dead (John 11:43). A number of the hymns, written in the first or second person, relate Lazarus' death, entombment and burial bonds symbolically to the individual's sinful state. Many of the resurrectional hymns of the normal Sunday service are sung while prayers for the departed, prescribed on Sundays, are permitted. During the divine liturgy, the baptismal hymn, "As many as have been baptized into Christ have put on Christ" (Romans 6:3) replaces the Trisagion indicating that this had been a day on which baptisms were performed and in some churches nowadays adult converts are still baptized on this day.

== Associated customs ==
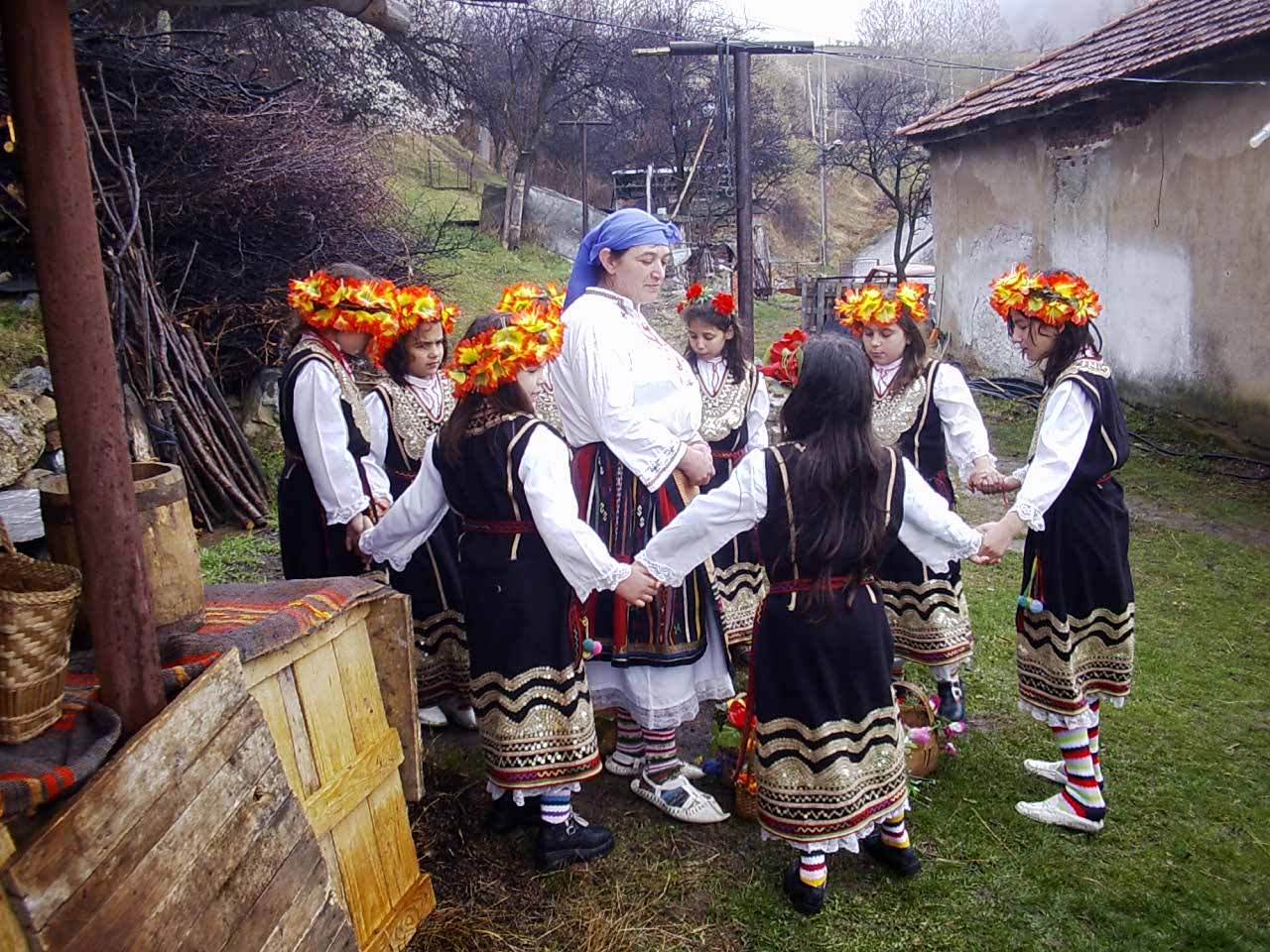
A Lazaruvane on Lazarus Saturday in Gara Bov, Bulgaria

=== Fasting ===
Although the forty days of Great Lent end on Lazarus Friday, this day is still observed as a fast day; however, the fast is mitigated to allow consumption of caviar, eggs being a symbol of the resurrection and prominent on Pascha, and fish eggs being a shadow thereof show the raising of Lazarus as a foreshadowing of Christ's Resurrection, as elucidated in the propers of the day.

=== Hermits ===
Lazarus Saturday is the day when, traditionally, hermits would leave their retreats in the wilderness to return to the monastery for the Holy Week services. In many places in the Russian Church, the vestments and church hangings on this day (Russian: Лазарева суббота or Вербная суббота) and on Palm Sunday are green, denoting the renewal of life. In the Greek Church, it is customary on Lazarus Saturday to plait elaborate crosses out of palm leaves which will be used on Palm Sunday.

== Regional observances ==
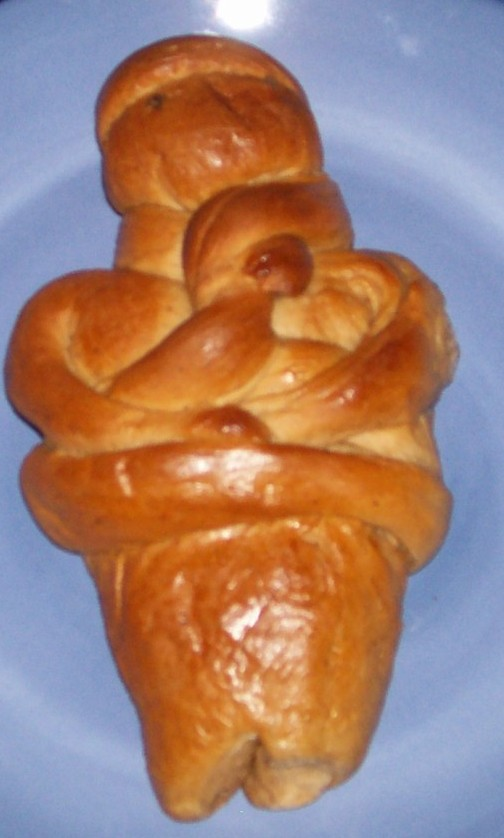
A lazarakia

=== Armenia ===
The Raising of Lazarus is also commemorated on this same Saturday according to the Church Calendar of the Armenian Apostolic Church.

=== Greece and Cyprus ===
Baking lazarakia to eat on Lazarus Saturday is a tradition practiced in Greece and Cyprus. It is said to have originated in Cyprus, and it is significant that St. Lazarus was their first bishop. The bread is a mildly sweet Lenten bread made with sweet-smelling spices that looks like Lazarus bound up in grave clothes.

India

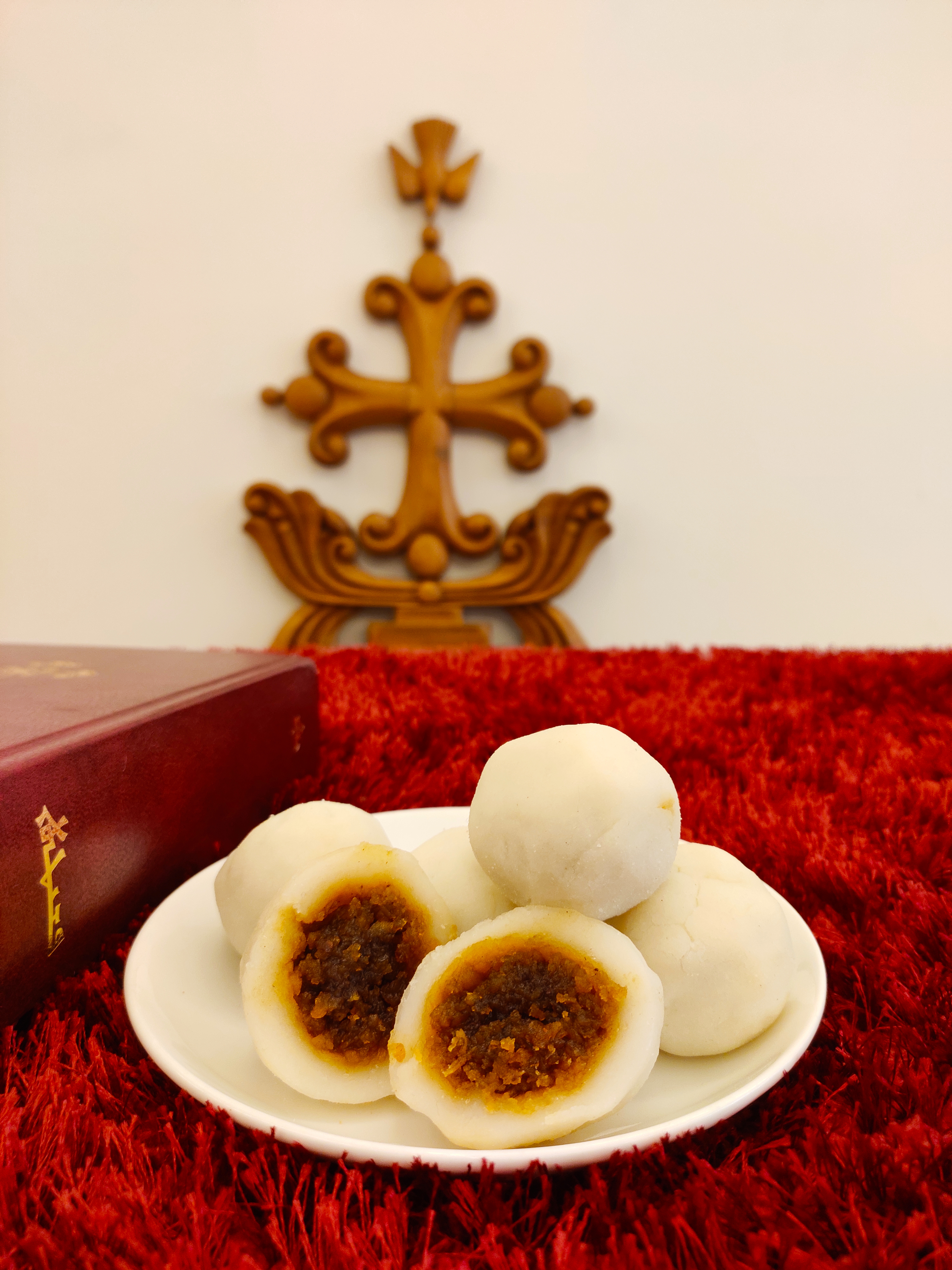

Among the Saint Thomas Christians of India, it is customary to make a rice dumpling called Kozhukkatta on Lazarus Saturday prior to Palm Sunday and the day is hence called Kozhukatta Saturday.

=== Serbia and Bulgaria ===
The feast of Lazarus Saturday is commemorated by Serbian Orthodox and Bulgarian Orthodox tradition. Due to a general lack of palm trees, willow twigs branches are blessed, and distributed to the faithful. In Serbia, small bells are often tied to the branches. Related traditions include:

- Burning a fire against vermin and snakes
- Picking flowers and herbs which are put in water to either drink or swim in
- Lazarice ritual, a procession, parade of six maids
