= Lazarice =

Eastern Orthodox procession

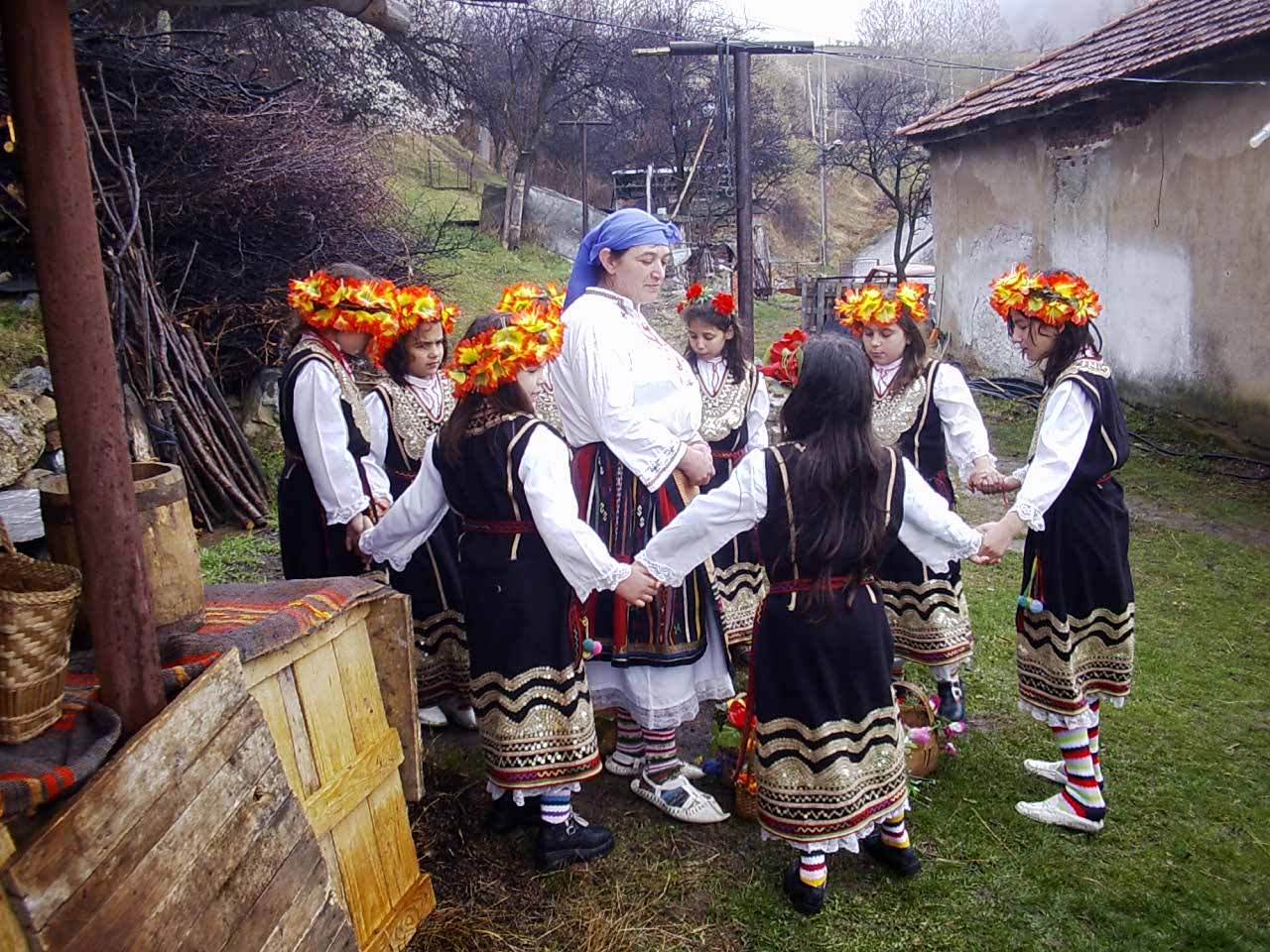
Lazaruvane rite in Bov, Bulgaria

Lazarice (Serbian: лазарице), also known by its Bulgarian name Lazaruvane (Bulgarian: лазаруване) or in Greek known as Lazarines (Greek: λαζαρίνες), is a South Slavic traditional procession during the Eastern Orthodox feast of Lazareva Subota (corresponding to but distinct from Lazarus Saturday in other Eastern Orthodox Churches), the day before Palm Sunday.

Historians and anthropologists think that Lazarice originated from the Roman Empire festival Rosalia, popularized in Southeastern Europe by the Romans after their conquest of Balkans in the 2nd century BC. Slavic tribes, settled in the Balkans in the 6th to 7th centuries, adopted and developed part of the Greek-Roman traditions in their rituals.

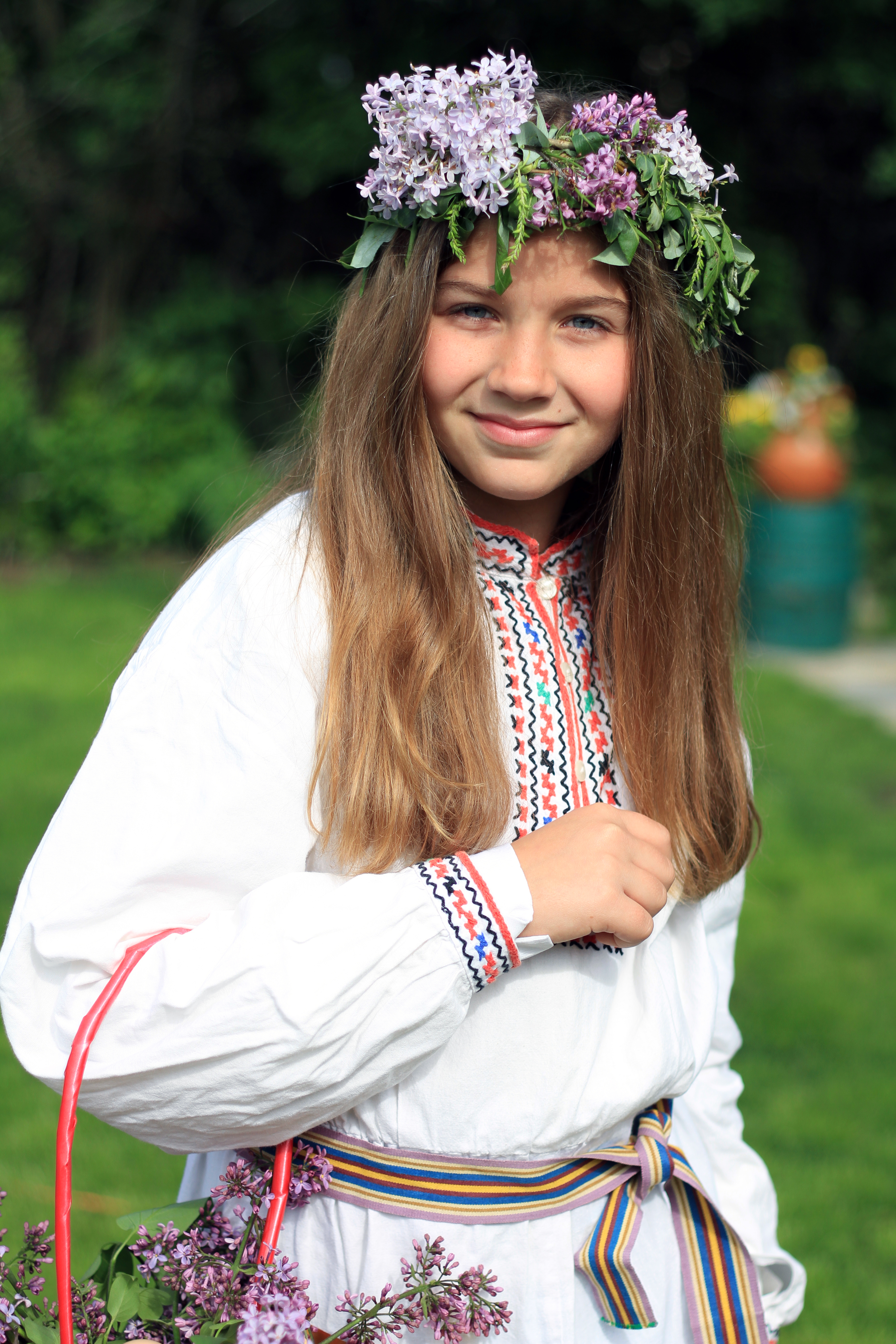
Lazarka from village of Aldomirovtsi, Bulgaria

Traditionally, a girl who has never participated in the ritual may not marry or be engaged. The ritual is performed by young girls (typically of age 16 who are unmarried), called lazarki (Bulgarian: лазарки). The girls decorate their hair richly and colourfully (usually with flower and ribbon wreaths) and dance around the village singing songs. They stop from house to house, performing songs and blessing the homes, accepting small presents and food from the hosts, typically the men. They meet by a river, where they drop their wreaths. It is said that the girl whose laurel first takes the lead will be married first. Traditionally, the groups of lazarki would number around 14, but there are regional variances.

The tradition is no longer widely practiced in the large cities where many people live, and tends to be kept alive in the smaller villages, at least those which have young girls.

== See also ==
- Kupala Night

== Bibliography ==
- Đorđević, D. (1958). Život i običaji narodni u Leskovačkoj Moravi Живот и обичаjи народни у Лесковачкоj Морави [Life and Customs of the People of Leskovac Morava] (in Serbian). Belgrade.
- Kamenova, A. (1992). "Proletni obichai ot Chiprovtsi" Пролетни обичаи от Чипровци [Spring Customs from Chiprovtsi]. Bŭlgarska etnografiya (in Bulgarian) (4). Sofia: 40–46.
- Marinov, D. (1914). Narodna vyara i religiozni narodni obichai Народна вяра и религиозни народни обичаи [Folk Faith and Religious Folk Customs] (in Bulgarian). Sofia.
